= 1991 in Michigan =

- Decades: 1970s; 1980s; 1990s; 2000s; 2010s
- See also: History of Michigan; Historical outline of Michigan; List of years in Michigan; 1991 in the United States

This article reviews 1991 in Michigan, including the state's office holders, demographics, performance of sports teams, cultural events, a chronology of the state's top news and sports stories, and notable Michigan-related births and deaths.

== Office holders ==
=== State office holders ===
- Governor of Michigan: John Engler (Republican)
- Lieutenant Governor of Michigan: Connie Binsfeld (Republican)
- Michigan Attorney General: Frank J. Kelley (Democrat)
- Michigan Secretary of State: Richard H. Austin (Democrat)
- Speaker of the Michigan House of Representatives: Lewis N. Dodak (Democrat)
- Majority Leader of the Michigan Senate: Dick Posthumus (Republican)
- Chief Justice, Michigan Supreme Court: Dorothy C. Riley/Michael Cavanagh

=== Mayors of major cities ===
- Mayor of Detroit: Coleman Young
- Mayor of Grand Rapids: Gerald R. Helmholdt
- Mayor of Warren, Michigan: Ronald L. Bonkowski
- Mayor of Sterling Heights, Michigan: Jean DiRezze Gush
- Mayor of Flint: Matthew S. Collier/Woodrow Stanley
- Mayor of Dearborn: Michael Guido
- Mayor of Lansing: Terry John McKane
- Mayor of Ann Arbor: Gerald Jernigan/Elizabeth Brater
- Mayor of Saginaw: Henry H. Nickleberry

=== Federal office holders ===
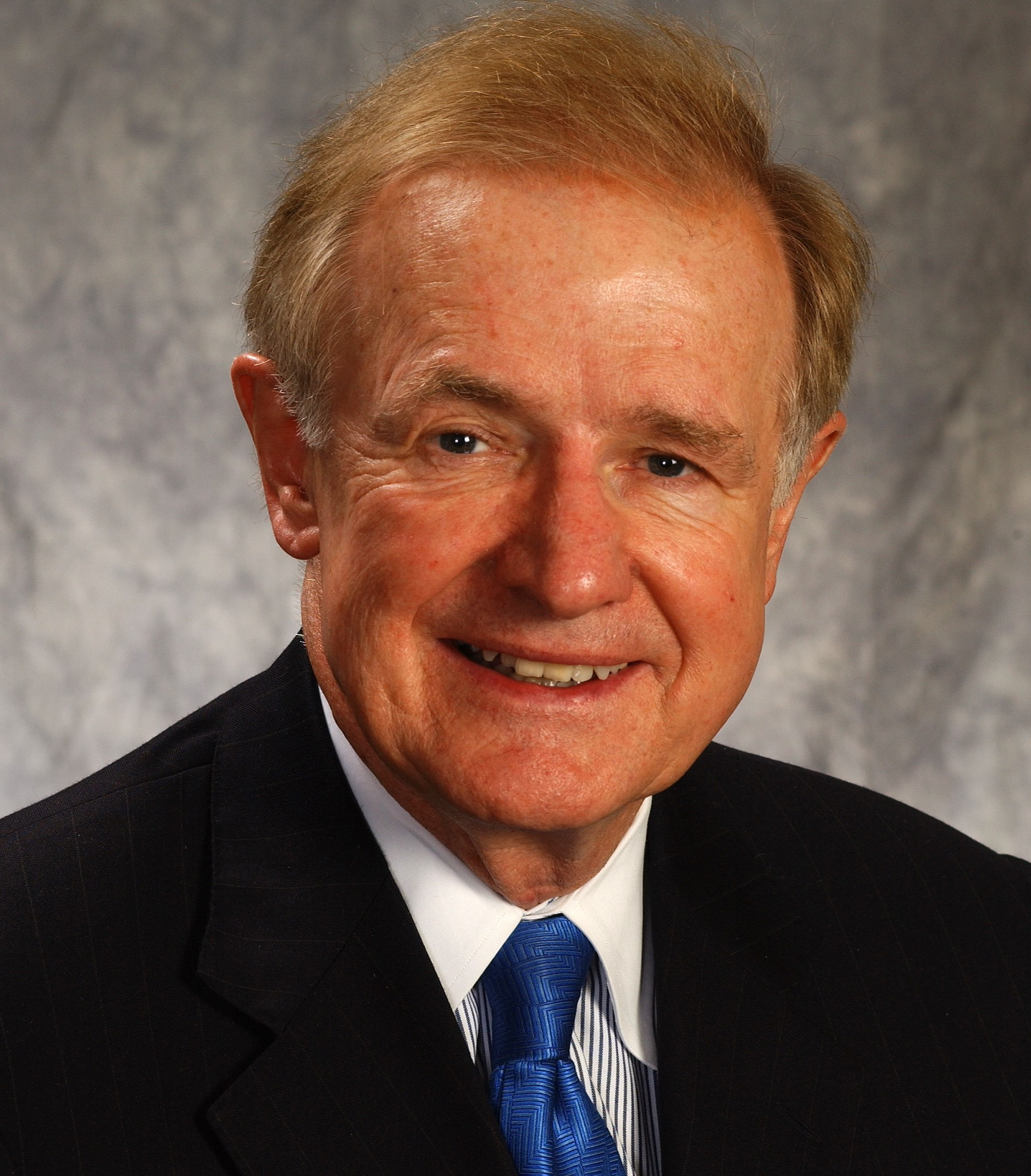
Sen. Riegle

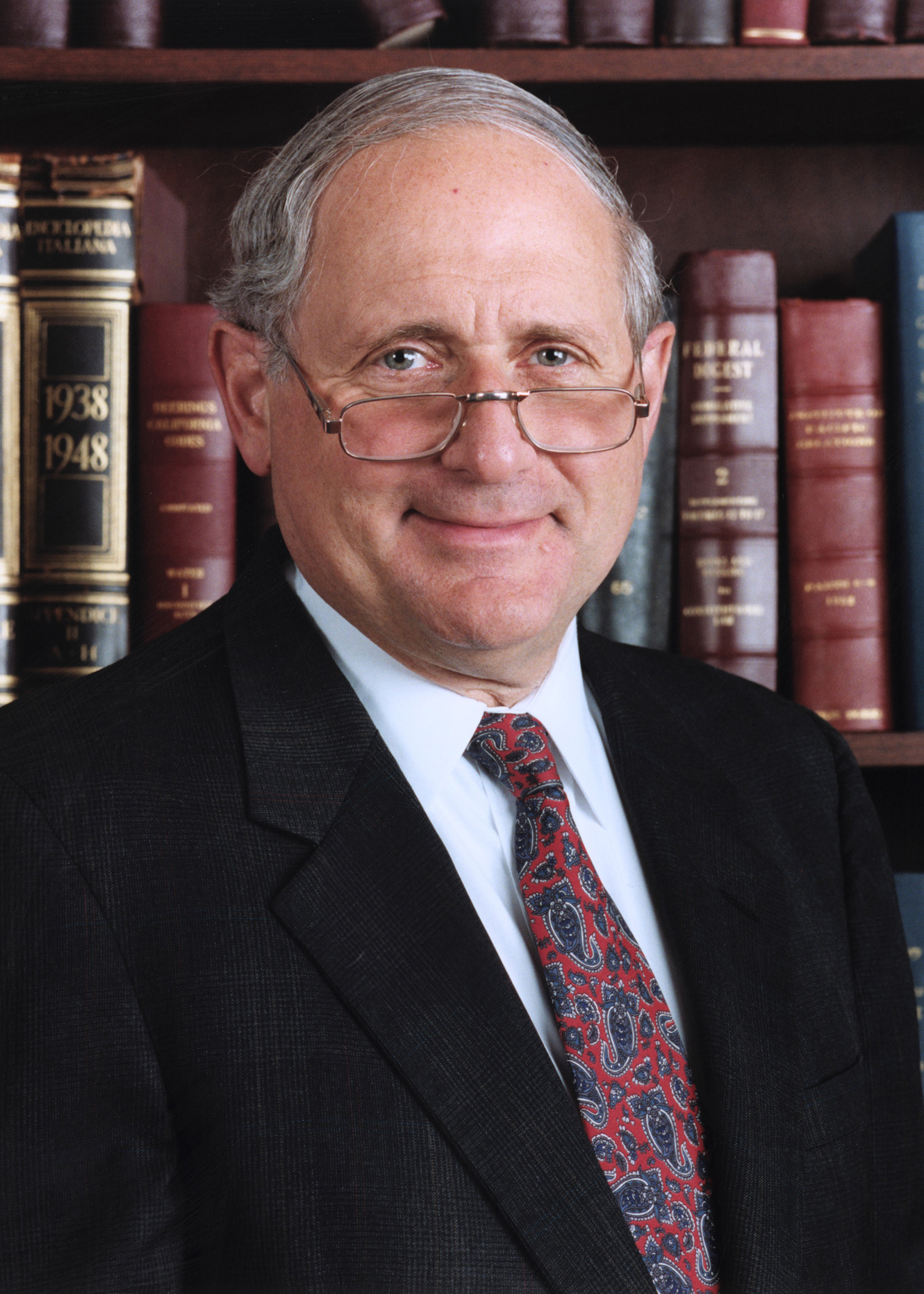
Sen. Levin

- U.S. Senator from Michigan: Donald W. Riegle Jr. (Democrat)
- U.S. Senator from Michigan: Carl Levin (Democrat)
- House District 1: John Conyers (Democrat)
- House District 2: Carl Pursell (Republican)
- House District 3: Howard Wolpe (Republican)
- House District 4: Fred Upton (Republican)
- House District 5: Paul B. Henry (Republican)
- House District 6: Bob Carr (Democrat)
- House District 7: Dale Kildee (Democrat)
- House District 8: J. Bob Traxler (Democrat)
- House District 9: Guy Vander Jagt (Republican)
- House District 10: Dave Camp (Republican)
- House District 11: Robert William Davis (Republican)
- House District 12: David Bonior (Democrat)
- House District 13: Barbara-Rose Collins (Democrat)
- House District 14: Dennis M. Hertel (Democrat)
- House District 15: William D. Ford (Democrat)
- House District 16: John Dingell (Democrat)
- House District 17: Sander Levin (Democrat)
- House District 18: William Broomfield (Republican)

== Population ==
In the 1990 United States census, Michigan was recorded as having a population of 9,295,29 persons, ranking as the eighth most populous state in the country. By 2000, the state's population had grown by 6.9% to 9,938,444 persons.

=== Cities ===
The following is a list of cities in Michigan with a population of at least 50,000 based on 1990 U.S. Census data. Historic census data from 1980 and 2000 is included to reflect trends in population increases or decreases. Cities that are part of the Detroit metropolitan area are shaded in tan.

| 1990 Rank | City | County | 1980 Pop. | 1990 Pop. | 2000 Pop. | Change 1990-2000 |
|---|---|---|---|---|---|---|
| 1 | Detroit | Wayne | 1,203,368 | 1,027,974 | 951,270 | −7.5% ▼ |
| 2 | Grand Rapids | Kent | 181,843 | 189,126 | 197,800 | 4.6% ▲ |
| 3 | Warren | Macomb | 161,134 | 144,864 | 138,247 | −4.6% ▼ |
| 4 | Flint | Genesee | 159,611 | 140,761 | 124,943 | −11.2% ▼ |
| 5 | Lansing | Ingham | 130,414 | 127,321 | 119,128 | −6.4% ▼ |
| 6 | Sterling Heights | Macomb | 108,999 | 117,810 | 124,471 | 5.7% ▲ |
| 7 | Ann Arbor | Washtenaw | 107,969 | 109,592 | 114,024 | 4.0% ▲ |
| 8 | Livonia | Wayne | 104,814 | 100,850 | 100,545 | −0.3% ▼ |
| 9 | Dearborn | Wayne | 90,660 | 89,286 | 97,775 | 9.5%▼ |
| 10 | Westland | Wayne | 84,603 | 84,724 | 86,602 | 2.2% ▲ |
| 11 | Kalamazoo | Kalamazoo | 79,722 | 80,277 | 76,145 | −5.1% ▼ |
| 12 | Southfield | Oakland | 75,608 | 75,745 | 78,322 | 3.4% ▲ |
| 13 | Farmington Hills | Oakland | 58,056 | 74,611 | 82,111 | 10.1% ▲ |
| 14 | Troy | Oakland | 67,102 | 72,884 | 80,959 | 11.1% ▲ |
| 15 | Pontiac | Oakland | 76,715 | 71,166 | 66,337 | −6.8% ▼ |
| 16 | Taylor | Wayne | 77,568 | 70,811 | 65,868 | −7.0% ▼ |
| 17 | Saginaw | Saginaw | 77,508 | 69,512 | 61,799 | −11.1% ▼ |
| 18 | St. Clair Shores | Macomb | 76,210 | 68,107 | 63,096 | −7.4% ▼ |
| 19 | Royal Oak | Oakland | 70,893 | 65,410 | 60,062 | −8.2% ▼ |
| 20 | Wyoming | Kent | 59,616 | 63,891 | 69,368 | 8.6% ▲ |
| 21 | Dearborn Heights | Wayne | 67,706 | 60,838 | 58,264 | −4.2% ▼ |
| 22 | Roseville | Wayne | 54,311 | 51,412 | 48,129 | −6.4% ▼ |
| 23 | East Lansing | Ingham | 51,392 | 50,677 | 46,525 | −8.2% ▼ |

=== Counties ===
The following is a list of counties in Michigan with populations of at least 150,000 based on 1990 U.S. Census data. Historic census data from 1980 and 2000 are included to reflect trends in population increases or decreases. Counties that are part of the Detroit metropolitan area are shaded in tan.

| 1990 Rank | County | Largest city | 1980 Pop. | 1990 Pop. | 2000 Pop. | Change 1900-2000 |
|---|---|---|---|---|---|---|
| 1 | Wayne | Detroit | 2,337,891 | 2,111,687 | 2,061,162 | −2.4% ▼ |
| 2 | Oakland | Pontiac | 1,011,793 | 1,083,592 | 1,194,156 | 10.2% ▲ |
| 3 | Macomb | Warren | 694,600 | 717,400 | 788,149 | 9.9% ▲ |
| 4 | Kent | Grand Rapids | 444,506 | 500,631 | 574,335 | 14.7% ▲ |
| 5 | Genesee | Flint | 450,449 | 430,459 | 436,141 | 1.3% ▼ |
| 6 | Washtenaw | Ann Arbor | 264,748 | 282,937 | 322,895 | 14.1% ▲ |
| 7 | Ingham | Lansing | 275,520 | 281,912 | 279,320 | −0.9% ▼ |
| 8 | Kalamazoo | Kalamazoo | 212,378 | 223,411 | 238,603 | 6.8% ▲ |
| 9 | Saginaw | Saginaw | 228,059 | 211,946 | 210,039 | −0.9% ▼ |
| 10 | Ottawa | Holland | 157,174 | 187,768 | 238,314 | 26.9% ▲ |
| 11 | Berrien | Benton Harbor | 171,276 | 161,378 | 162,453 | 0.6% ▲ |
| 12 | Muskegon | Muskegon | 157,589 | 158,983 | 170,200 | 7.1% ▲ |
| 13 | Jackson | Jackson | 151,495 | 149,756 | 158,422 | 5.8% ▼ |

== Sports ==
=== Baseball ===
- 1991 Detroit Tigers season – Under manager Sparky Anderson, the Tigers compiled an 83–79 record and finished second in American League East. The team's statistical leaders included Tony Phillips with a .284 batting average, Cecil Fielder with 44 home runs and 133 RBIs, Bill Gullickson with 20 wins, and Mike Henneman with a 2.88 earned run average.

=== American football ===
- 1991 Detroit Lions season – Under head coach Wayne Fontes, the Lions compiled a 12–4 record and finished first in the NFC Central Division. The team's statistical leaders included Erik Kramer with 1,635 passing yards, Barry Sanders with 1,548 rushing yards and 102 points scored, and Brett Perriman with 668 receiving yards.
- 1991 Michigan Wolverines football team – Under head coach Gary Moeller, the Wolverines compiled a 10–2 record, won the Big Ten Conference championship, lost to Washington in the 1992 Rose Bowl, and were ranked No. 6 in the final AP poll. The team's statistical leaders included Elvis Grbac with 2,085 passing yards, Ricky Powers with 1,197 rushing yards, and Desmond Howard with 985 receiving yards and 138 points scored.
- 1991 Michigan State Spartans football team – Under head coach George Perles, the Spartans compiled a 3–8 record. The team's statistical leaders included Jim Miller with 1,368 passing yards, Tico Duckett with 1,204 rushing yards, Courtney Hawkins with 656 receiving yards, and Jim DelVerne with 52 points scored.

=== Basketball ===
- 1990–91 Detroit Pistons season – Under head coach Chuck Daly, the Pistons compiled a 50–32 record, finished second in the NBA's Central Division, and lost to the Chicago Bulls in the East Conference Finals. The team's statistical leaders included Joe Dumars with 1,809 points scored, Isaiah Thomas with 671 assists, and Dennis Rodman with 1,132 rebounds.

=== Ice hockey ===
- 1990–91 Detroit Red Wings season – Under head coach Bryan Murray, the Red Wings compiled a 34–38–8 record and finished third in the NHL Norris Division. Steve Yzerman led the team with 51 goals, 57 assists, and 108 points. The team's goaltenders included Glen Hanlon (19 games) and Tim Cheveldae (65 games).

== Music and culture ==
- February 23 - Madonna's single Rescue Me was released and rose to No. 9 on the Billboard Hot 100.
- August 27 - Bob Seger's album The Fire Inside was released.

== Births ==
- January - Froggy Fresh, singer and rapper, in Burton
- January 1 - Abdullah Hammoud, mayor of Dearborn, in Dearborn
- January 14 - Kiana Weber, violinist, in Chelsea
- January 30 - Ryan Scott Graham, bassist, punk rocker, in Westland
- March 4 - Draymond Green, basketball player, in Saginaw
- March 7 - Amy Shields, freestyle unicyclist, in Ann Arbor
- March 15 - Keshawn Martin, wide receiver, in Inkster
- April 11 - Amanda Chidester, softball player and coach, NPF Player of Year (2019), in Allen Park
- May 31 - Griz, DJ, songwriter, and electronci music producer, in Southfield
- June 28 - Larry Warbasse, road racing cyclist, in Dearborn
- June 28 - Haley Kopmeyer, soccer goalkeeper, in Troy
- July 16 - Aiden Zhane, drag performer, in Howell
- August 6 - Riley Montana, fashion model and singer, in Detroit
- September 2 - Steve Johnson, politician, in Byron Center
- September 18 - Cordaro Stewart, rapper, in Detroit
- October 10 - Nitty Scott, rapper and wpoken word poet, in Grand Rapids
- October 10 - Fleurie, musician, in Canton
- October 22 - Ashley Fiolek, motocross racer, in Dearborn
- November 26 - Dizzy Wright, rapper and producer, in Flint
- 1990 - Ethan James Green, photographer, filmmaker, director, and gallerist, in Caledonia

== Deaths ==
- February 6 - Danny Thomas, a native of Deerfield, Michigan, entertainer, and star of Make Room for Daddy (1953–1964), at age 79 in Los Angeles
- February 20 - John Fetzer, television executive and former owner of the Detroit Tigers, at age 89 in Honolulu
- March 19 - Russ Thomas, player for Detroit Lions (1946-1949) and GM of the club (1967-1989)
- June 1 - David Ruffin, Motown singer and member of The Temptations, at age 50 in Philadelphia
- September 18 - Rob Tyner, lead singer of the MC5, at age 46
- November 10 - Dick the Bruiser, professional wrestler, at age 62 in Tampa, Florida

== See also ==
- History of Michigan
- History of Detroit
