= 2021 Dearborn mayoral election =

- August 3, 2021 (first round); November 2, 2021
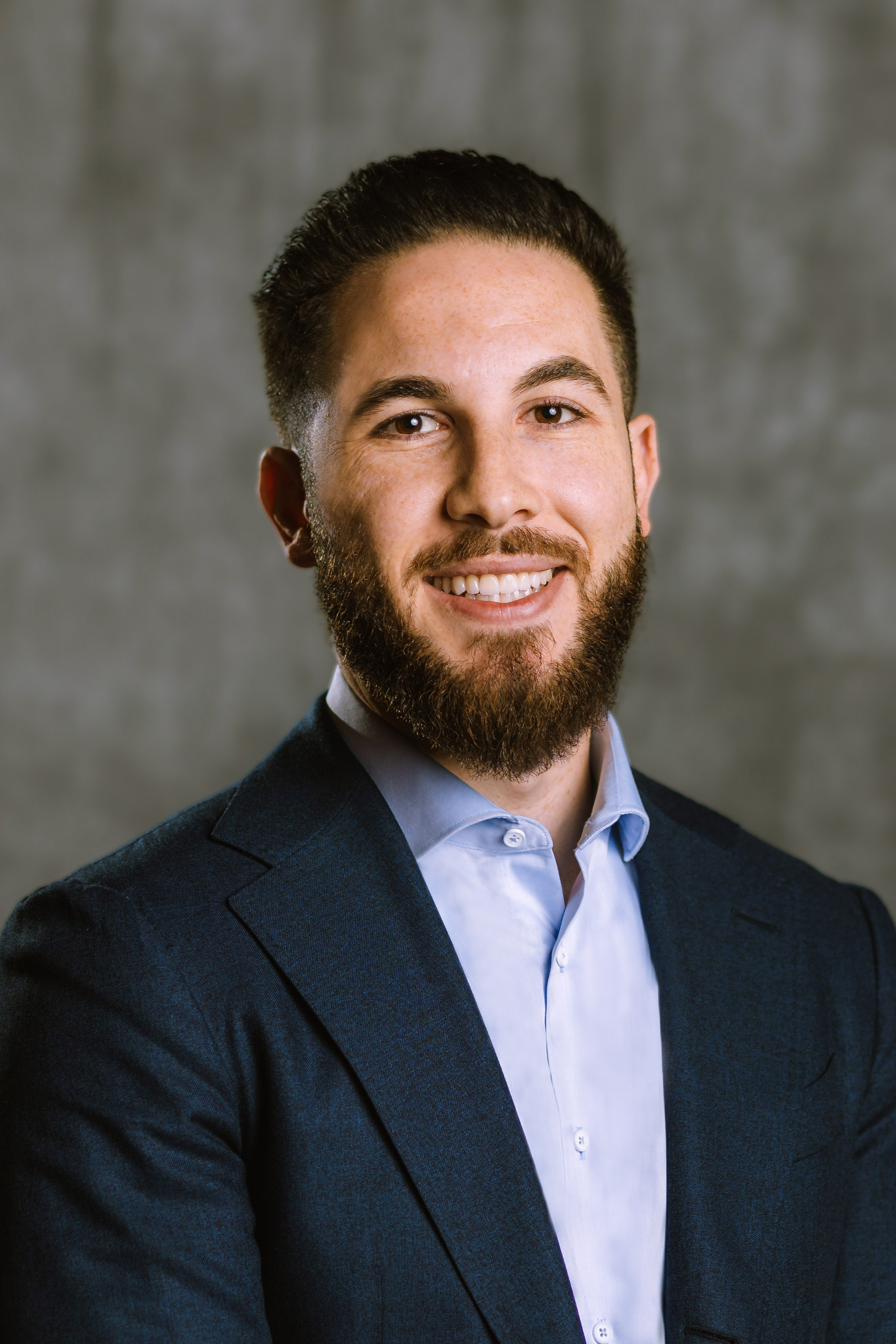

Candidate	Abdullah Hammoud	Gary Woronchak
Party	Nonpartisan	Nonpartisan
First round	8,858; 42.01%	3,889; 18.45%
Runoff	13,035; 54.60%	10,795; 45.22%
Candidate	Susan Dabaja	Tom Tafelski
Party	Nonpartisan	Nonpartisan
First round	2,067; 16.33%	2,067; 16.33%
Runoff	Eliminated	Eliminated
Mayor before election
John B. O'Reilly Jr.
Nonpartisan
Elected mayor
Abdullah Hammoud
Nonpartisan

The 2021 Dearborn mayoral election took place on November 2, 2021, following a primary election on August 3, 2021. Incumbent Mayor John B. O'Reilly Jr. declined to seek re-election, creating an open seat for the first time in thirty-six years. A crowded field emerged to succeed O'Reilly, and in the primary, State Representative Abdullah Hammoud placed first, receiving 42 percent of the vote. Former County Commissioner Gary Woronchak narrowly beat out City Council President Susan Dabaja for second, winning 18 percent of the vote to Dabaja's 17 percent. Hammoud ultimately defeated Woronchak by a wide margin, winning 55–45 percent, becoming the city's first Muslim mayor.

== Primary election ==
=== Candidates ===
- Abdullah Hammoud, State Representative
- Gary Woronchak, former Wayne County Commissioner, former State Representative
- Susan Dabaja, City Council President
- Tom Tafelski, former City Council President
- Hussein Berry, member of the Dearborn School Board
- Jim Farrelly, financial adviser
- Kalette Shari Willis, Iraq War veteran, Henry Ford College student

=== Results ===
2021 Dearborn mayoral primary election
Party	Candidate	Votes	%
Nonpartisan	Abdullah Hammoud	8,858	42.01%
Nonpartisan	Gary Woronchak	3,889	18.45%
Nonpartisan	Susan Dabaja	3,554	16.86%
Nonpartisan	Tom Tafelski	3,123	14.81%
Nonpartisan	Hussein Berry	829	3.93%
Nonpartisan	Jim Parrelly	736	3.49%
Nonpartisan	Kalette Willis	85	0.40%
Write-in		10	0.05%
Total votes		21,084	100.00%

== General election ==
=== Candidates ===
2021 Dearborn mayoral general election results
Party	Candidate	Votes	%
Nonpartisan	Abdullah Hammoud	13,035	54.60%
Nonpartisan	Gary Woronchak	10,795	45.22%
Write-in		44	0.18%
Total votes		23,874	100.00%
