= Rhyno =

American professional wrestler (born 1975)

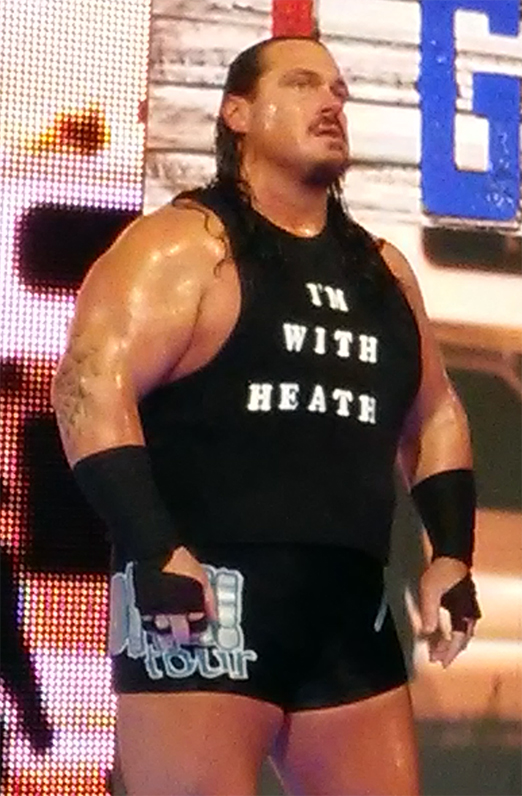
- Rhyno in 2017

Personal information
- Born: Terrance Guido Gerin; October 7, 1975 (age 51) Detroit, Michigan, U.S.

Professional wrestling career
- Ring name(s): Holb; Rhino; Rhino Richards; Rhyno
- Billed height: 5 ft 10 in (178 cm)
- Billed weight: 295 lb (134 kg)
- Billed from: Detroit, Michigan
- Trained by: Scott D'Amore
- Debut: March 10, 1995

Terrance Guido Gerin (born October 7, 1975) is an American professional wrestler better known by the ring name Rhyno (or Rhino). He is best known for his tenures in Extreme Championship Wrestling (ECW), WWE, and Total Nonstop Action Wrestling (TNA).

Gerin started his career in the Canadian independent circuit as Rhino Richards. He was signed by the American promotion ECW in 1999, where he shortened his name to Rhino. He remained with ECW until it closed in 2001, where he was the final World Heavyweight and World Television Champion. He then joined the World Wrestling Federation (later renamed WWE) with several other ECW wrestlers and was involved in the Invasion angle, in which ECW and WCW alumni joined forces against WWF wrestlers. He worked as Rhyno for WWE until 2005, when he signed with Total Nonstop Action Wrestling (TNA) and defeated Jeff Jarrett to win the NWA World Heavyweight Championship. He lost it two days later and remained with TNA until 2010.

In 2015, Rhyno returned to WWE. He initially worked in NXT, its developmental territory, and was promoted to the main roster in December. During his time on the SmackDown brand, he teamed with Heath Slater and won a tournament to become the inaugural SmackDown Tag Team Champions. He left WWE again in 2019 and returned to TNA.

== Early life ==
Gerin was born on October 7, 1975, in Detroit, Michigan. He is of Italian descent, with his ancestry being Venetian. He was the youngest of three brothers with whom he would regularly watch professional wrestling. When Gerin was 16 his father died following a second heart attack. He graduated from Annapolis High School in Dearborn Heights, Michigan where he was on the wrestling team and played football. During his school year Gerin spent his time working at local restaurants and a newspaper delivery service. Gerin trained in Windsor, Ontario, Canada.

== Professional wrestling career ==
=== Early career (1995–1998) ===
Gerin trained as a wrestler at the Can-Am Wrestling School located in Windsor, Ontario under Scott D'Amore, with whom he later reunited in Total Nonstop Action Wrestling (TNA). He began training on September 24, 1994, and had his first match on March 10, 1995. Gerin made four appearances in World Championship Wrestling (WCW) as enhancement talent under the ring name Terry Richards. Richards lost to "Hacksaw" Jim Duggan on the August 5, 1995, edition of WCW Saturday Night. WCW Television Champion The Renegade defeated Richards on the September 9 edition of WCW Pro. Richards and Johnny Swinger lost to the Nasty Boys on the September 16 edition of WCW Saturday Night. Then lost to Road Warrior Hawk on the September 23, 1995, edition of WCW WorldWide. His final appearance was a loss to Johnny B. Badd on the January 13, 1996 edition of WCW Pro.

In the World Wrestling Federation (WWF), Gerin lost to Fatu on the October 21, 1995 espiode of WWF Superstars. Then he lost to Henry O. Godwinn on the November 6, 1995, episode of Monday Night Raw (wrestling under the name "Terry Richards"). He was part of the losing team in a six-man tag team match against The Truth Commission at the June 23, 1997 WWF Shotgun Saturday Night taping (aired June 28). Gerin then adopted the ring name Rhino Richards and began wrestling in Canada, where he formed a stable known as "THUG Life" with Joe Legend, Zakk Wyld (Keith Assoun), Christian Cage, Bloody Bill Skullion, Brett Kimball, and Sexton Hardcastle (later named Edge). He wrestled a dark match at the June 29, 1998 WWF Shotgun Saturday Night taping, defeating Breyer Wellington.

=== Catch Wrestling Association (1997–1998) ===
In 1997, Gerin relocated to Hanover, Germany, where he began competing for the Catch Wrestling Association (CWA) under the ring name "Rhino Richards". On October 10, 1998, he teamed with XL Legend to win the vacant CWA World Tag Team Championship, defeating Rico de Cuba and August Smisl. The titles were vacated in October 1998 when Gerin left the promotion after signing with Extreme Championship Wrestling (ECW).

=== Extreme Championship Wrestling (1999–2001) ===
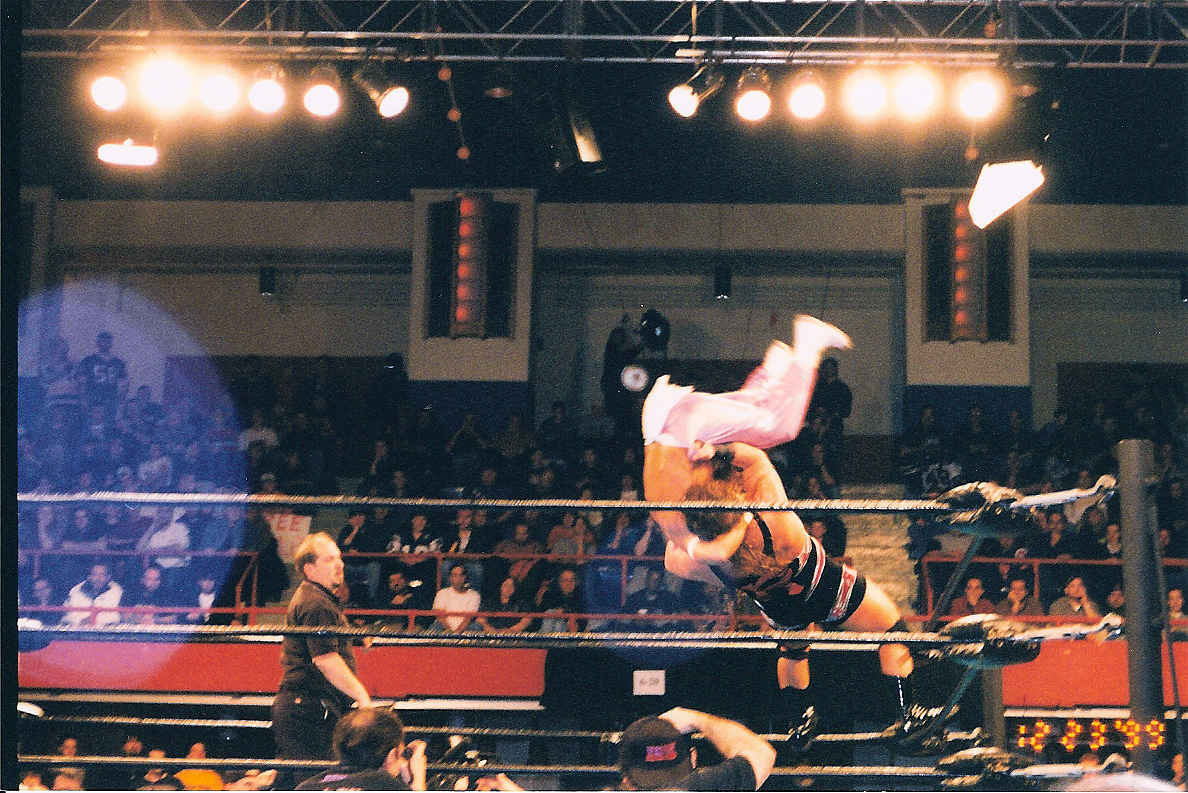
Rhino performing a superplex on Sabu in 1999

Gerin debuted in ECW on February 19, 1999, at a live event as "Rhino Richards", teaming with Nova to defeat the Full Blooded Italians (Tracy Smothers and Little Guido). After working a few live events during his early months in the promotion, Gerin made his televised debut as a heel on the June 25 episode of ECW Hardcore TV as "Rhino", a comically aggressive, psychotic, and unstable powerhouse wrestler who reveled in extremely violent wrestling and ferocious brutality. He was introduced by Steve Corino and Jack Victory as Taz's opponent in a match, which Rhino quickly lost.

Rhino made his first pay-per-view appearance at Heat Wave, where he aided Corino and their new ally Yoshihiro Tajiri during their matches. When ECW debuted on national television with a weekly show on TNN, the alliance of Rhino, Corino, Victory and Tajiri joined Cyrus to form a group called The Network. Cyrus represented TNN and was viewed as criticizing the hardcore wrestling style of ECW. Rhino's first match at a pay-per-view took place at Anarchy Rulz, where Rhino and Corino unsuccessfully challenged Tommy Dreamer and Raven for the ECW World Tag Team Championship, but were defeated. On the October 1 episode of ECW on TNN, Rhino received his first opportunity for the ECW World Heavyweight Championship against Mike Awesome, which he failed to win. In late 1999, Rhino began feuding with The Sandman, and at November to Remember he teamed with the Impact Players to defeat Dreamer, Raven, and Sandman.

On January 29, 2000, Rhino competed against Rob Van Dam for the ECW World Television Championship. Van Dam retained the title but fractured his ankle which forced him to vacate the title. A tournament was set up to crown the new champion and Rhino participated in the tournament for the vacant title. He defeated Spike Dudley on the March 10 episode of ECW on TNN and advanced to the tournament final at Living Dangerously after The Sandman was eliminated by forfeit. Rhino faced Super Crazy in the finals of the tournament later that night, which headlined the show. Rhino lost after interference by RVD. However, Rhino won the World Television Championship on April 22 by defeating Yoshihiro Tajiri at CyberSlam, thus beginning his first title reign in ECW. Throughout mid-2000, Rhino continued to feud with The Sandman, defeating him in a title match at Hardcore Heaven. During that match, Rhino performed a Rhino Driver to the Sandman's wife and valet, Lori. Rhino would then defend the title against Sandman, a second time at Heat Wave. Before the match, Rhino attacked the couple and attempted to force Lori's head into a toilet. Rhino would go on to retain the title.

He lost the title to Kid Kash on August 26 at Midtown Massacre, but regained it a little over two weeks later on September 9. After winning his second World Television Championship, Rhino resumed his feud with Rob Van Dam, defeating him to retain the title at Anarchy Rulz. Rhino continued his title reign by successfully defending the title against New Jack at November to Remember and Spike Dudley at Massacre on 34th Street.

Rhino won the ECW World Heavyweight Championship on January 7, 2001, at Guilty as Charged, defeating Sandman in a squash match immediately after The Sandman had won the title from Steve Corino in a three-way tables, ladders, chairs, and canes match. He defended the title twice, defeating Sandman on January 12 and Spike Dudley on January 13, 2001, on the last two ECW shows and was the final World Heavyweight Champion and World Television Champion as the company folded in April.

=== World Wrestling Federation/Entertainment (2001–2005) ===
==== Team RECK and The Alliance (2001−2002) ====
Following the closure of ECW, Gerin signed a contract with the World Wrestling Federation (WWF). He debuted on the March 19, 2001, episode of WWF Raw is War, in Albany, New York at the Pepsi Arena, under the ring name Rhyno as a heel, aligning himself with Edge and Christian. Rhyno went on to help Edge and Christian defeat The Hardy Boyz and The Dudley Boyz for the WWF Tag Team Championship in a Tables, Ladders, and Chairs match at WrestleMania X-Seven on April 1. On the April 19 edition of SmackDown!, Rhyno defeated Kane to win the WWF Hardcore Championship. At Backlash on April 29, he defeated Raven to retain the title. At Judgment Day on May 20, Rhyno, Edge, and Christian formed a stable with Kurt Angle known as Team RECK, with all four members reaching the semi-finals of the King of the Ring tournament. Rhyno was eliminated from the event by the eventual winner, Edge at King of the Ring on June 24. He won the Hardcore Championship a total of three times in mid-2001.

On the July 9 episode of Raw is War, Rhyno "invaded" the WWF along with other ECW wrestlers. The group, led by former ECW owner Paul Heyman, went on to merge with rival organization WCW later that night, forming The Alliance. At Invasion on July 22, Rhyno competed in the main event the Inaugural Brawl match; five-on-five tag team match where Team WCW/ECW (Booker T, Diamond Dallas Page, (WCW) Rhyno and the Dudley Boyz (Bubba Ray Dudley and D-Von Dudley) (ECW)) defeated Team WWF (Stone Cold Steve Austin, Kurt Angle, Chris Jericho, The Undertaker and Kane). Rhyno feuded with Chris Jericho due to Jericho insulting Stephanie McMahon, the on-screen owner of ECW, on numerous occasions. One notable moment during the feud saw Rhyno Gore Jericho through the SmackDown! stage set on the August 9 episode of SmackDown!. This culminated in a match between the two at SummerSlam on August 19, in which Rhyno lost to Jericho. On September 23 at Unforgiven, he defeated fellow ECW alumnus Tajiri for the WCW United States Championship. He held the title for just under a month before losing to Kurt Angle on the October 22 episode of Raw. As a result of his loss, Rhyno was "suspended" from The Alliance on the October 25 episode of SmackDown!. The suspension was an angle concocted to explain Rhyno's absence while he underwent cervical fusion surgery for two herniated discs in his neck. The surgery was successfully performed on November 12.

==== Various alliances (2002–2005) ====
Rhyno made an unofficial return to television in a backstage segment with New Raw General Manager Eric Bischoff on the July 22, 2002 episode of Raw.

Rhyno returned to WWE television sixteen months later on the February 27, 2003, episode of SmackDown!, aligning himself with Chris Benoit and turning into a face as they defeated Matt Hardy and Shannon Moore. He subsequently joined the SmackDown! brand. Rhyno and Benoit went on to unsuccessfully challenge Team Angle for the WWE Tag Team Championship in a triple threat tag team match also involving Los Guerreros at WrestleMania XIX on March 30. At Judgment Day on May 18, Rhyno teamed with Spanky and Chris Benoit to lose to John Cena and The Full Blooded Italians (Chuck Palumbo and Johnny Stamboli). After losing to Benoit in the opening round of the United States Championship tournament on the June 19 episode of SmackDown!, Rhyno turned on Benoit during Benoit's match against Eddie Guerrero for the United States Championship at Vengeance on July 27, thus turning heel once again. At SummerSlam on August 24, Rhyno competed in a fatal four-way match for the United States Championship against Guerrero, Benoit and Tajiri, but failed to win the title. Rhyno's feud with Benoit was resolved in a singles match between the two on the September 11 episode of SmackDown!, which Rhyno lost.

Rhyno made his first appearance in the Royal Rumble match at the Royal Rumble on January 25, 2004, by entering at #6 but was eliminated by the eventual winner Chris Benoit. On the February 12 episode of SmackDown!, Rhyno got disqualified in a match against Hardcore Holly for shoving the referee. It led to a rematch between the two at No Way Out on February 15, which Rhyno lost. On the March 22 episode of Raw, Rhyno was drafted to the Raw brand in the 2004 WWE Draft Lottery. Later that night, he unsuccessfully faced Chris Benoit for the World Heavyweight Championship. The next week on Raw, he turned face once again by first squashing Lance Storm in a match, and then formed a tag team with Tajiri where the duo defeated Jonathan Coachman and Garrison Cade in a tag team match at Vengeance on July 11. In the fall, Rhyno and Tajiri began pursuing the World Tag Team Championship and entered a feud with the champions La Résistance (Sylvain Grenier and Robért Conway), unsuccessfully challenging them for the titles at Unforgiven on September 12. Rhyno and Tajiri received another title shot against La Résistance on the November 15 episode of Raw in a triple threat match, also involving William Regal and Eugene. Regal and Eugene won the titles.

On the January 10, 2005, episode of Raw, Rhyno lost a Royal Rumble qualifying match to Edge. Rhyno was released from his WWE contract on April 9, along with his friend Matt Hardy due to a public argument with his wife that took place at the WrestleMania 21 afterparty. He made his final appearance on WWE television at the WWE-produced ECW reunion pay-per-view One Night Stand on June 12, where he lost to Sabu.

=== Total Nonstop Action Wrestling (2005–2010) ===
==== NWA World Heavyweight Champion (2005–2006) ====
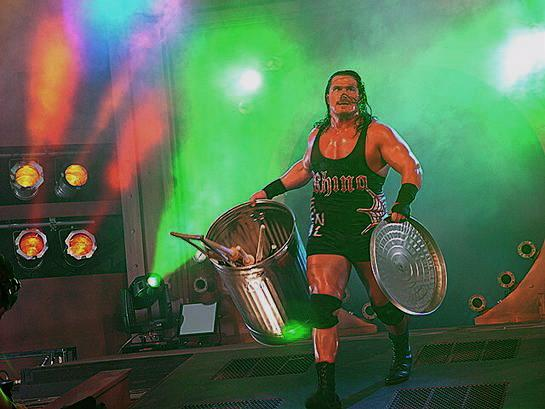
Rhino competing for TNA in Orlando, Florida

After time on the independent circuit, Gerin made his debut in Total Nonstop Action Wrestling (TNA) on July 17, 2005, at No Surrender, as Rhino, reverting to the ECW spelling of his wrestling name. He debuted by hitting then-NWA World Heavyweight Champion Raven with the Gore following a match with Abyss, thus debuting as both a heel and a member of Planet Jarrett.

These events led to a match being scheduled between the team of Rhino and Jeff Jarrett and the team of Raven and the returning Sabu at Sacrifice on August 14. During the Sacrifice preshow, Director of Authority Larry Zbyszko informed Jarrett, who had lobbied for a title shot for several weeks, that if he could pin Raven, he would receive a shot at the NWA World Heavyweight Championship at Unbreakable on September 11. If Jarrett lost the match, he would be prohibited from receiving an NWA World Heavyweight Championship match for one year. Later that night, during the tag match, Jeff Hardy returned to TNA, attacking Jarrett and enabling Rhino to Gore and pin Raven. An irate Jarrett, furious at having lost his shot at the title, watched as Zbyszko announced Rhino to be the new number one contender immediately after the pay-per-view went off the air. Rhino faced Raven at Unbreakable in a match which saw him accidentally Gore a shopping cart in homage to his WWF Hardcore Championship bout with Raven at Backlash in the WWF. Despite interference from Jarrett, Raven retained his title after hitting Rhino with an Even Flow DDT.

Rhino fought Jeff Hardy in the main event of the debut episode of Impact! on Spike TV on October 1. The match was declared a no-contest after both Abyss and Sabu interfered. At Bound for Glory on October 23, Rhino, Abyss, Sabu, and Hardy faced each other in a Monster's Ball match, which Rhino won after hitting a second rope Rhino Driver on Hardy. Later that night, Rhino won a 10-man Gauntlet match to determine who would face Jeff Jarrett for his NWA World Heavyweight Championship after Kevin Nash, Jarrett's scheduled opponent, was rushed to the hospital due to a legitimate injury. Rhino went on to defeat Jarrett and win the title, turning face in the process. Rhino lost the NWA World Heavyweight Championship back to Jarrett on a 2-hour prime time special episode of Impact! on November 3.

Starting with the November 26 episode of Impact!, TNA started airing promos about Rhino's career and personal life in preparation for his title rematch at Turning Point on December 11. He lost the rematch to Jarrett after a guitar shot and interference from all of Team Canada.

==== Various feuds (2006–2008) ====
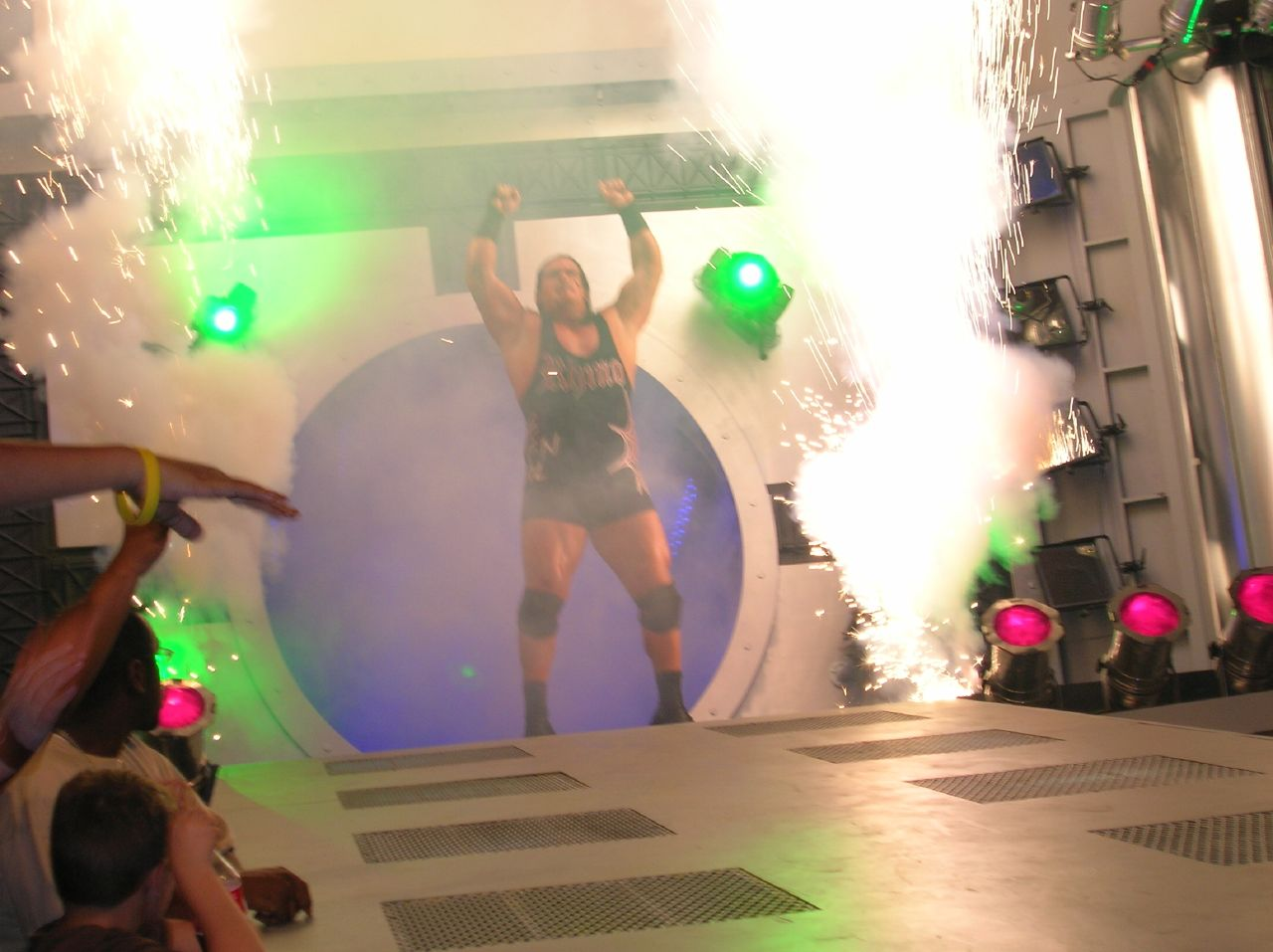
Rhino making his entrance

In 2006, Rhino then wrapped up a brutal feud with Abyss, who (due to his alignment with Planet Jarrett) halted Rhino's war on Team Canada. The feud saw Abyss Black Hole Slam Rhino on to several chairs, and Rhino smash Abyss through a steel wall with the Gore. Their singles feud ended at Against All Odds on February 12 when Rhino Gored Abyss off of a fifteen-foot ramp on to four tables. Rhino became a member of Sting's four-man team of "Warriors", joining A.J. Styles and Ron Killings to fight Jeff Jarrett's "Army" in a Lethal Lockdown match at Lockdown on April 23, which Rhino's team won.

On June 9, after Rhino defeated Jeff Jarrett at a TNA house show in the old ECW Arena in Philadelphia, he publicly acknowledged that he had been offered a contract to come back to WWE and wrestle for the new ECW. He stayed with TNA. On July 11, Rhino made an open challenge against WWE for their current incarnation of ECW. The shocking revelation was that he did not like the direction of the new ECW and threw the "real" ECW World Heavyweight Championship (hidden in a burlap sack as Rhino stated WWE threatened legal action if he showed it) into an oil drum and burned it (he later admitted that it was a replica, and he still has the original belt at his home).

He then feuded with Monty Brown and Samoa Joe. This resulted in the three men competing at Hard Justice on August 13, which ended with Samoa Joe winning by pinning Monty Brown after slamming Brown through a table. Rhino then entered into a feud with Christian Cage, playing off their former history together in WWE, Japan, and Canada. The feud continued when Christian and Rhino faced off in an Eight Mile Street Fight at Bound for Glory on October 22. Christian won after a con-chair-to with a ladder, a broken table, a street sign, and some chairs on top of Rhino. This feud culminated on the November 16 episode of Impact!, where he faced Cage in a six-sides of steel barbed wire match. Cage won the match after Rhino's Gore sent him through the door of the cage.

Near the end of 2006, Rhino entered into a program with A.J. Styles. This started with Rhino trying to help Styles with his situation with Christopher Daniels, only to have Styles pull away and accuse Rhino of getting into his business, thus turning him heel. Rhino lost to Styles at Turning Point on December 10 after Styles faked a knee injury and then pinned Rhino with a roll-up. At Final Resolution on January 14, 2007, Rhino defeated Styles in a Last Man Standing match. Rhino set up tables in anticipation of sending Styles through them with a Gore. Styles saw what was happening and declined to get up, thus losing. After the match, Rhino swore he was not through with Styles and gave him a Rhino Driver on the entrance ramp.

At Against All Odds on February 11, Styles defeated Rhino in a Motor City Chain match after dodging a Gore and rolling up Rhino for the pin. Styles then challenged any wrestler in TNA to wrestle him at Destination X on March 11 in the debut of the Elevation X match and Rhino accepted the challenge. At Destination X, Rhino defeated Styles in the Elevation X match after a Gore, and stomping on Styles' fingers. On March 22, Rhino was chosen as the third member of Kurt Angle's team for the Lethal Lockdown match at Lockdown on April 15, along with Samoa Joe and eventually Jeff Jarrett and Sting. Team Angle was successful at Lockdown after defeating Christian's Coalition in the Lethal Lockdown match. Rhino had a big spot in the match when he Gored Tomko through the cage door.

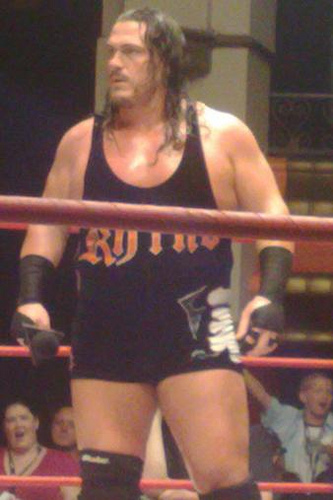
Rhino competing at a TNA show

Rhino went through short feuds with Christopher Daniels and The Latin American Xchange before moving on to his next big feud with James Storm. On the June 21 Impact!, Storm and Robert Roode defeated Rhino and Eric Young. Following the match, Storm poured beer on Rhino, causing him to snap. Two weeks later, Rhino had a sit-down interview with Mike Tenay and revealed that he was a recovering alcoholic, and that caused him to snap after being covered with beer.

The feud between Rhino and Storm resulted in a match at Victory Road on July 15. Storm won the match after hitting Rhino with a beer bottle. After the match was over Storm and Jackie Moore attacked Rhino and poured beer into his mouth and left him bleeding in the ring. At Hard Justice on August 12, Rhino lost a Bar Room Brawl to Storm, after Storm smashed a beer bottle into the back of Rhino's head, but Rhino beat him at No Surrender on September 9. After the match, he gored Moore. Rhino then feuded with Raven, resulting in a Monster's Ball match at Bound for Glory on October 14 between Rhino, Raven, Abyss, and Black Reign which Abyss won.

At Turning Point on December 2, he was scheduled to participate in a match teaming with Abyss to take on Black Reign and Rellik, but he was replaced by Raven due to injury. After battling a kayfabe alcoholism relapse (brought on by the James Storm storyline), Rhino officially made his return at Against All Odds on February 10, 2008, when he Gored Storm, which caused Eric Young to retain his World Drinking Championship. On March 9, Rhino defeated Storm at Destination X, in the second official Elevation X Match, making Rhino 2–0 in Elevation X.

==== Alliance with Christian and TNA Front Line (2008–2009) ====
The next week, Christian Cage had to find a tag partner to help him fight A.J. Styles and Tomko and asked Rhino to join him, but Rhino refused due to their past history (Cage had since turned face). Tomko, Styles, and Team 3D attacked Cage after his tag team match with Kevin Nash. The following week on Impact!, Cage managed to get Rhino on his side during an interview with Jeremy Borash. At Lockdown on April 13 in the Lethal Lockdown match, Rhino pinned Storm to get the win for Cage's team. Rhino went on to form a tag team with Cage and they competed in the Deuces Wild Tag Team Tournament to crown new tag team champions by beating The Motor City Machine Guns (Chris Sabin and Alex Shelley) to qualify. The tournament took place at Sacrifice on May 11 where they beat the team of Robert Roode and Booker T, but lost in the second round to Team 3D after Brother Ray hit Rhino with a kendo stick. Rhino beat James Storm to qualify for the King of the Mountain match at Slammiversary on June 8, where Samoa Joe retained the TNA World Heavyweight Championship. Since then, Rhino formed a tag team with Christian Cage. At Hard Justice on August 10, Rhino and Christian Cage defeated Team 3D to end their feud.

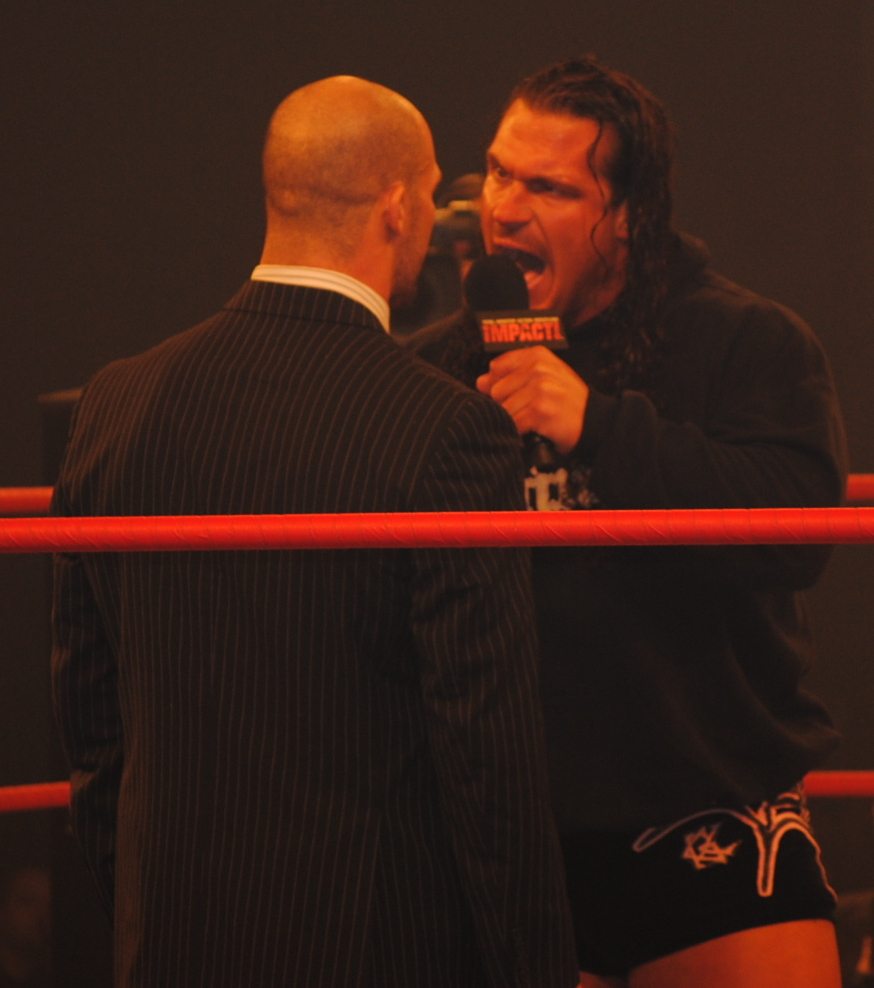
Rhino during his feud with the "Godfather of the Main Event Mafia", Kurt Angle, in October 2009

Rhyno and Christian quietly went their separate ways, with Cage going to main events and Rhino along with then TNA Women's Champion Taylor Wilde starting a feud with The Beautiful People and Cute Kip shortly after Hard Justice. At Bound for Glory IV on October 12, Rhino along with ODB and Rhaka Khan (who recently turned face) defeated The Beautiful People and Cute Kip in a Bimbo Brawl. On the October 23 episode of Impact!, Rhino confronted Sheik Abdul Bashir over political views. He was later attacked by Bashir. The feud ended after Rhino got revenge and defeated Sheik at Turning Point on November 9.

On the November 20 episode of Impact!, Rhino attacked The Main Event Mafia, but the Main Event Mafia fought back and placed him in a casket. The next week, Rhino officially joined A.J. Styles and Samoa Joe, naming the group the TNA Front Line. Rhino decided the Front Line had to have more members if they wanted to beat the Main Event Mafia, and, much to the surprise and questioning of the group, asked Team 3D to join the Front Line. Later in the night, Team 3D agreed to join the Front Line, helping Styles and Joe attack the Main Event Mafia. At Genesis on January 11, 2009, Rhino lost to Sting in a TNA World Heavyweight Championship match.

==== Heel turn (2009–2010) ====
At the Lockdown pre-show on April 19, Eric Young defeated Danny Bonaduce. After the bout, Bonaduce attacked Young, but Rhino came to the ring to aid Young and then gored Bonaduce. He then began an angle in which he trained Jesse Neal, a former member of the military, to become a pro wrestler. Rhino became frustrated and short-tempered. This led to a tag match on the August 13 episode of Impact!, which Neal lost after a rookie mistake, refusing a hot tag to Rhino. Rhino turned heel by goring his protege. His former mentors, Team 3D, realized what a selfish man Rhino was, thus leading to a feud between them.

Rhino appeared at No Surrender on September 20 to face new signee Bobby Lashley. Despite goring him twice, Rhino was defeated following a knockout punch. On the October 15 episode of Impact!, he lost a stretcher match to Bobby Lashley. The following week, Rhino claimed that TNA was favoring the younger talent of TNA, while trying to force veterans like himself out of TNA. After weeks of persuasion, on the November 5 episode of Impact! Team 3D turned heel and joined Rhino in his cause.

At Turning Point on November 15, Rhino along with Team 3D defeated Matt Morgan, Hernandez and D'Angelo Dinero after a Gore by Rhino. On the November 19 episode of Impact! Jesse Neal turned heel and joined Rhino and Team 3D. Two weeks later, Suicide joined Morgan, Hernandez and Dinero to level the playing field. At Final Resolution on December 20, Morgan, Hernandez, Dinero and Suicide defeated Neal, Team 3D and Rhino in an eight-man elimination tag team match. When Hulk Hogan and Eric Bischoff took over TNA at the beginning of 2010, Rhino's angle was discontinued and Team 3D reverted to being faces and began feuding with The Nasty Boys.

==== EV 2.0 and departure (2010) ====
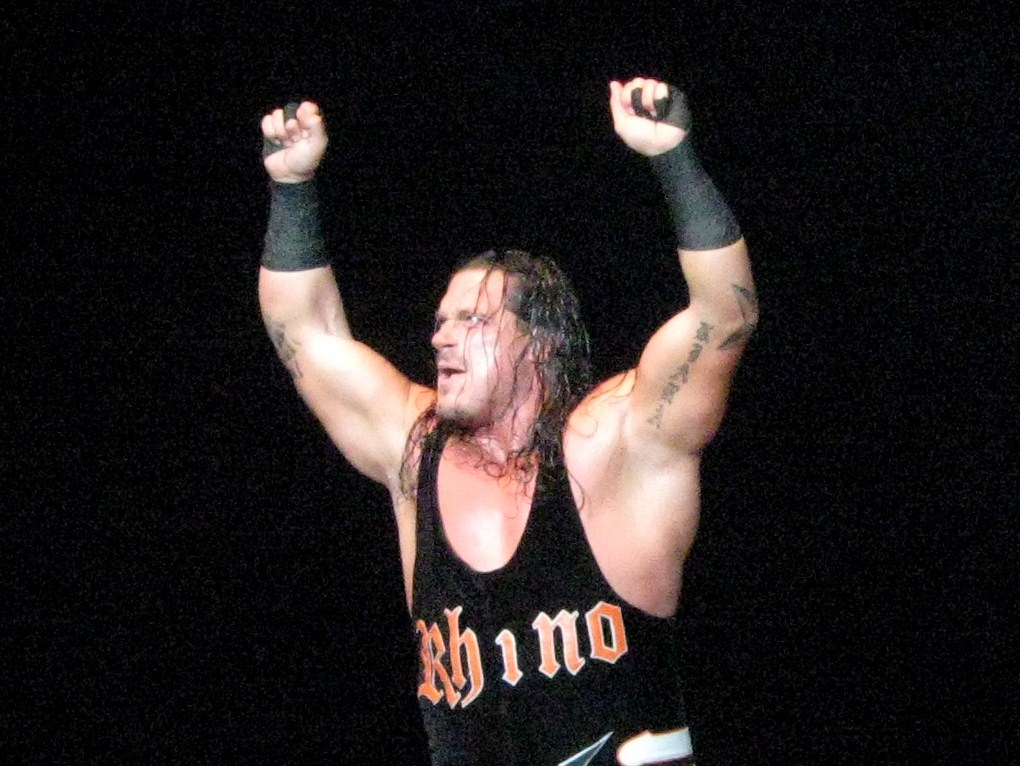
Rhino performing his entrance

After being absent from television for four months, Rhino returned on the July 1 episode of Impact!, appearing in the Impact! Zone crowd beside fellow ECW alumni Tommy Dreamer, Raven and Stevie Richards, thus seemingly turning back into a face. On the July 15 episode of Impact! Rhino, Dreamer, Raven, Richards, Brother Devon, Pat Kenney and Al Snow, led by Mick Foley, aligned themselves with the TNA World Heavyweight Champion Rob Van Dam by attacking Abyss and the rest of the TNA locker room. The following week, TNA president Dixie Carter agreed to give the ECW alumni their own reunion pay–per–view event, Hardcore Justice: The Last Stand on August 8, as a celebration of hardcore wrestling and a final farewell to ECW. At Hardcore Justice, Rhino defeated Al Snow and Brother Runt in a three-way match.

On the following episode of Impact!, the ECW alumni, known collectively as EV 2.0), were assaulted by A.J. Styles, Kazarian, Robert Roode, James Storm, Douglas Williams and Matt Morgan of Ric Flair's Fourtune stable, who thought they did not deserve to be in TNA. During the assault Abyss came out, fought Rob Van Dam backstage and caused him storyline injuries, which forced him to vacate the TNA World Heavyweight Championship and led to EV 2.0 looking for revenge. On the August 26 episode of Impact! Rhino called out Abyss for what he had done and then laid him out with a Gore. At No Surrender on September 5, Abyss defeated Rhino in a Falls Count Anywhere match.

At Bound for Glory on October 10, Rhino, Dreamer, Raven, Richards and Sabu defeated Fourtune members Styles, Kazarian, Morgan, Roode and Storm in a Lethal Lockdown match. Shortly after, his contract with TNA expired, but he remained with TNA on a per night deal. At Turning Point on November 7, EV 2.0 faced Fortune in a ten-man tag team match, where each member of EV 2.0 put their TNA careers on the line. In the end, EV 2.0 lost the match and Sabu was released from TNA. On the following episode of Impact!, Rhino revealed himself as the man within EV 2.0, who had been calling Eric Bischoff, trying to get to be a part of his Immortal stable, which had led to dissension between Rob Van Dam, who wanted to find out the traitor, and the rest of EV 2.0, by costing Van Dam his match against Kazarian and hitting Tommy Dreamer with a chair, turning heel again in the process.

On the November 18 episode of Impact! Rhino explained that Bischoff had agreed to re–sign him as long as he turned on the rest of EV 2.0. The following week Dreamer defeated Rhino in a Street Fight. After the match Rhino attacked Dreamer, but was then chased away by Rob Van Dam, who challenged him to a First Blood match at Final Resolution on December 5, which Van Dam ended up winning. On the following episode of Impact! Bischoff refused to give Rhino a contract with TNA and had Fortune and Immortal remove him from the arena.

=== Independent circuit (2011–2016) ===
Since his departure from TNA, Rhino has appeared in several independent promotions across the United States and Canada. In May 2011, Rhino took part in New Japan Pro-Wrestling's (NJPW) first tour of the United States, the Invasion Tour 2011. In the main event of the first night on May 13 in Rahway, New Jersey, Rhino teamed with Charlie Haas in a tag team match, where they defeated IWGP Heavyweight Champion Hiroshi Tanahashi and Togi Makabe after Rhino pinned Makabe. At the following day's event in New York City, Rhino pinned Kazuchika Okada in a six-man tag team match, where he teamed with Davey Richards and Homicide against Okada, Makabe and Ryusuke Taguchi. On the third and final day of the tour, Rhino was defeated by Makabe in the main event, a "South Philadelphia Street Fight", at the former ECW Arena. On May 29 Rhyno appeared in Dutch Pro Wrestling beating Kenzo Richards in an Extreme rules match.

He also wrestled in Resistance Pro Wrestling. On February 17, 2012, at Vicious Circle, he was defeated by the RPW Heavyweight Champion Harry Smith. Rhino had another chance for the title at Obsession, where Smith put on the line his RPW title and Rhino, his ECW World Heavyweight Championship, but the match ended without a winner. The last match between them took place on May 11, 2012, at A Small Deadly Space, where Rhino was defeated by Smith, with Raven as Special Referee.

On September 1, he was defeated in a match against Bill Collier for the PWR Heavyweight Championship in Wattsburg, Pennsylvania. On October 4, he wrestled against the FWE Heavyweight Champion Tommy Dreamer at the Family Wrestling Entertainment's first PPV, Back 2 Brooklyn, but was defeated. On October 6, 2012, Rhino participated in the House of Hardcore's first show, defeating Sami Callihan.

On May 30, 2014, Rhino won the UCW (Universal Championship Wrestling) Heavyweight title. He faced "The Natural" Chase Stevens in a street fight after "The Headliner" Chris Michaels was a no-show.

On November 17, Rhino reached a tournament final to crown the first Extreme Rising World Championship, he reached the final round on December 29 but was defeated by Stevie Richards. On June 6, 2014, Rhino and Abyss were defeated by Tommy Dreamer and Devon at Tommy Dreamer's House of Hardcore. On July 18, 2015, at House of Hardcore IX, Austin Aries beat him.

Rhino made a surprise appearance for Glasgow's Insane Championship Wrestling promotion at Long Before Wesley Snipes on July 25, 2015, when he called out Drew Galloway for a shot at the ICW World Heavyweight Championship. Rhino was unsuccessful in this match and was also defeated by Wolfgang the following day at Shug's Hoose Party. On November 15, Rhino returned to ICW to Fear & Loathing VIII, losing to Joe Coffey before a 4,000 person capacity crowd.

On November 1, 2015, Rhino challenged the Pro Wrestling Pride Heavyweight Champion Big Grizzly, in a championship match in Paignton, Devon. Grizzly successfully defended his title, and again in December in a four-way match in Exeter also featuring the UK Dominator and Chris Andrews. Rhino had four more matches in the company; completing three victories before a loss to 'Man Mountain' Lomaxx.

=== Ring of Honor (2011–2013) ===
Rhino was revealed to be the bodyguard hired by Prince Nana to protect The Embassy from Homicide on June 13, 2011. In his debut match for the promotion on June 26 at Best in the World 2011, Rhino was defeated by Homicide in a Street Fight. In his next ROH appearance at the Death Before Dishonor IX pay-per-view on September 17, 2011, Rhino and fellow Embassy member Tommaso Ciampa defeated Homicide and Jay Lethal in a tag team match.

Rhino returned to Ring of Honor television in April 2012, being traded from the Embassy to Truth Martini's House of Truth and was announced as the opponent of "Die Hard" Eddie Edwards for the Border Wars pay per view on May 12. Edwards pinned him. On September 15 at Death Before Dishonor X: State of Emergency, Rhino unsuccessfully challenged Kevin Steen for the ROH World Championship. Soon after, he was hired by the members of S.C.U.M. to attack the number contender Jay Lethal, but was stopped by Steen. At the ROH 11th Anniversary Show, Rhino attacked Lethal after his match against Steen. At the June 23 tapings of Ring of Honor Wrestling, S.C.U.M. was forced to disband, after being defeated by Team ROH in a Steel Cage Warfare match. Gerin left ROH, shortly thereafter.

=== Return to TNA (2014) ===
On June 20, 2014, Rhino returned to TNA during the Impact Wrestling tapings, as he attacked Bully Ray on behalf of Ethan Carter III to help him win a Tables match, re-establishing himself as a heel in the process. On the July 24 episode of Impact Wrestling, Rhino, Ethan Carter III and Rockstar Spud defeated Tommy Dreamer, Bully Ray, and Devon in a 6-man New York City street fight. On the August 7 episode of Impact Wrestling, Rhino, Ethan Carter III, Snitsky, and Rycklon faced Team 3D, Tommy Dreamer and Al Snow in an Eight-Man Hardcore War but lost the match. On the August 20 episode of Impact Wrestling, EC3 blamed Rhino for Dixie Carter being put through a table two weeks prior and viciously attacked him. This turned Rhino face once again. On the August 28 episode, Ethan Carter III defeated him. On the September 18 episode, he did it again in an NYC Street Fight. Rhino's profile was moved to the Alumni section of TNA's website on February 13, 2015, following his departure.

=== Return to WWE (2015–2019) ===
==== NXT Championship pursuit (2015–2016) ====
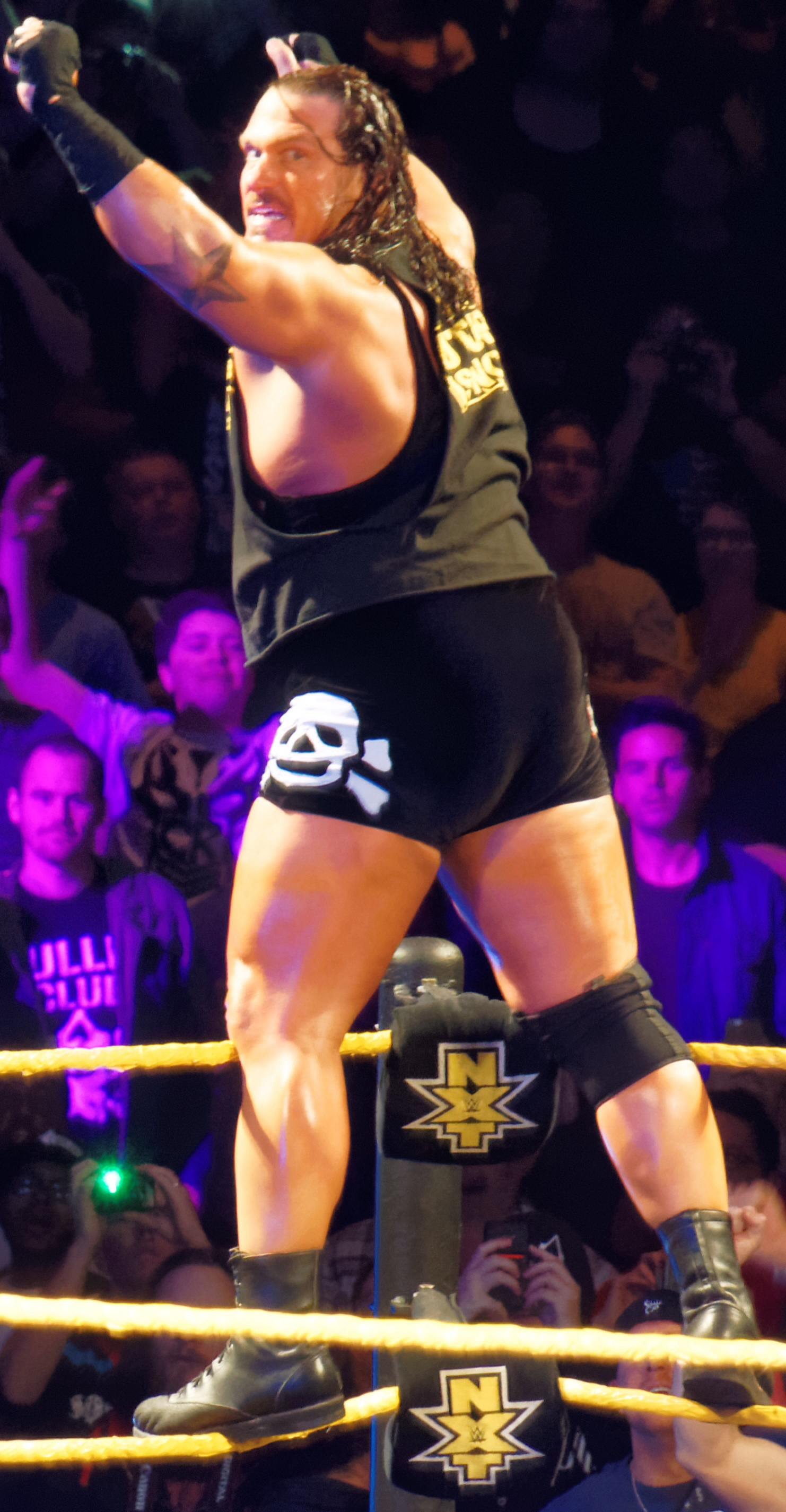
Rhyno in March 2015

Rhyno made an unannounced return to WWE on February 18, 2015, during the taping of NXT, defeating Elias Samson. After a few weeks of defeating jobbers, Rhyno explained he was in NXT to win the NXT Championship. On the April 15 episode of NXT, he lost to Sami Zayn. On the May 6 episode of NXT, after defeating Bull Dempsey, Rhyno challenged Baron Corbin to a match at NXT TakeOver: Unstoppable, which he lost. On the June 3 episode, following his loss to Finn Bálor, he gored Bálor on the stage, turning heel. On the July 1 episode, he teamed with Kevin Owens and lost to Bálor and Samoa Joe.

In September, Rhyno and Baron Corbin entered the Dusty Rhodes Tag Team Classic, defeating The Ascension in the first round and Johnny Gargano and Tommaso Ciampa in the quarterfinals. At NXT TakeOver: Respect, they beat Jason Jordan and Chad Gable in a semifinal before losing to Finn Bálor and Samoa Joe in the final. On the October 14 episode of NXT, Rhyno competed in a battle royal to determine the #1 contender for the NXT Championship, where he was eliminated by Corbin. The following week on NXT, Rhyno lost to Corbin.

On the December 7, 2015, episode of Raw, Rhyno made a main roster appearance as a face, where he joined The Dudley Boyz and Tommy Dreamer as part of a revamped incarnation of The ECW Originals, confronting The Wyatt Family before competing in a 16-man elimination fatal 4-way tag team match, where they were eliminated by The League of Nations. At TLC: Tables, Ladders & Chairs, the ECW Originals lost to the Wyatt Family in an 8-man elimination tag team tables match and in an 8-man Extreme Rules match the following night on Raw.

Rhyno made a surprise return on the July 6, 2016, episode of NXT, interrupting a match between The Hype Bros and Blake and Murphy. On the July 20 episode of NXT, Rhyno lost to NXT Champion Samoa Joe by submission.

==== Teaming with Heath Slater and departure (2016–2019) ====
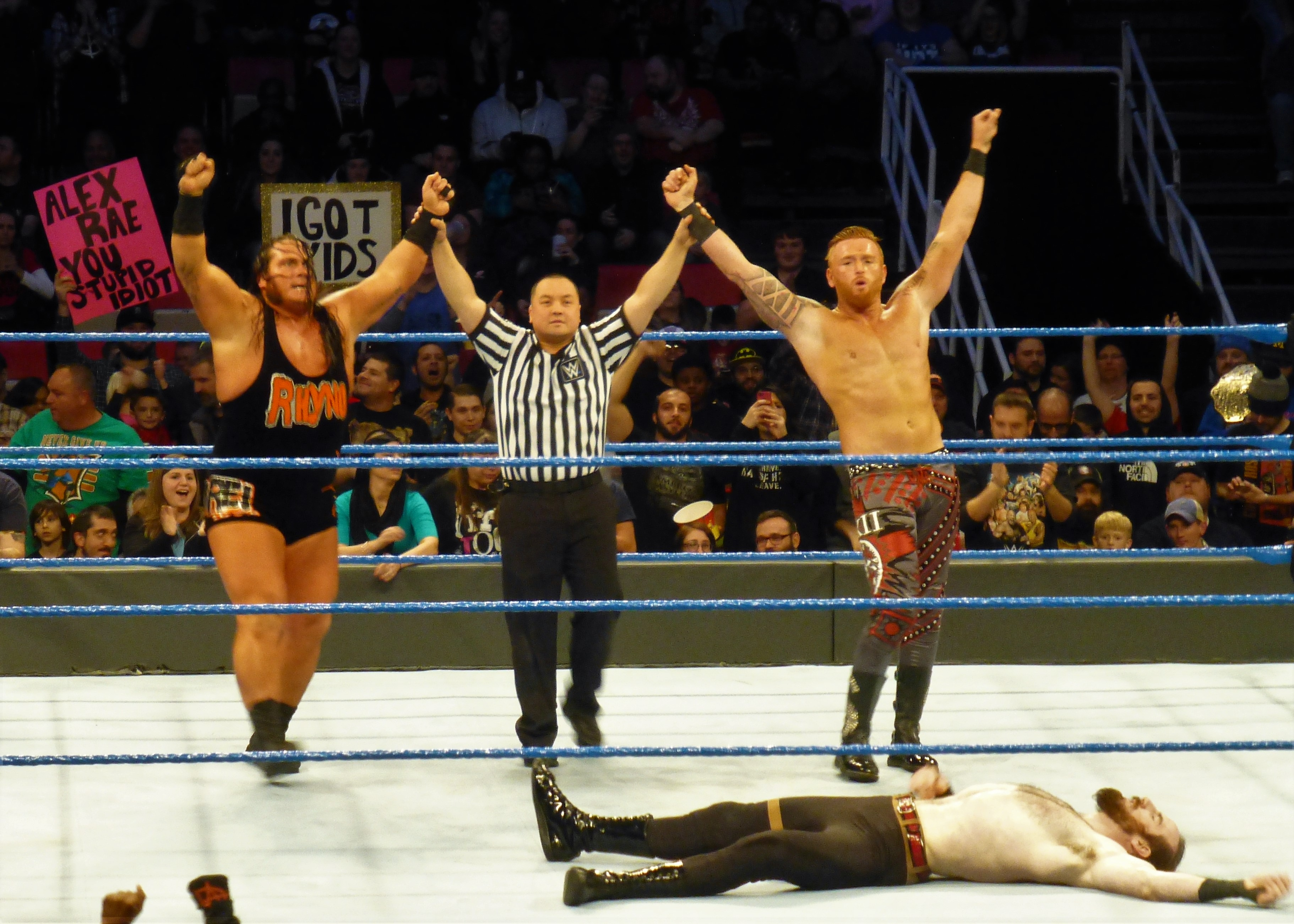
Rhyno (left) and Heath Slater posing after defeating The Vaudevillains in December 2016

On the July 26 episode of SmackDown Live, Rhyno returned to attack "free agent" Heath Slater with a Gore. On the August 9 episode of SmackDown Live, the two wrestled each other with the stipulation that if Slater won, he would be signed to the SmackDown roster. Rhyno defeated Slater. On the August 23 episode of SmackDown, Slater was offered a spot in the tournament for the newly instated SmackDown Tag Team Championship if he found a partner. After struggling to find a partner, Rhyno approached Slater and agreed to be his partner for the tournament. Rhyno and Slater defeated The Headbangers in the first round and The Hype Bros in the semi-finals to advance to the finals at Backlash, where they defeated The Usos to become the inaugural champions, while also granting Slater a contract. On the September 13 episode of SmackDown Live, Rhyno and Slater defeated The Ascension to successfully retain the titles in their first defense following Slater's official live contract signing. At No Mercy, Rhyno and Slater retained the titles against The Usos. At Survivor Series, Rhyno and Slater were the team captains for Team SmackDown in the 10–on–10 Survivor Series Tag Team Elimination match, where they were defeated by Team Raw. At TLC on December 4, Rhyno and Slater's tag team championship reign came to an end at 84 days after they were defeated by The Wyatt Family (Bray Wyatt and Randy Orton). Two days later on SmackDown Live, Rhyno and Slater received their rematch, but failed to regain the titles. At Elimination Chamber on February 12, 2017, the duo were the first entrants into the tag team turmoil match for the titles, eliminating Breezango and The Vaudevillains before being eliminated by The Usos. At WrestleMania 33, Rhyno competed in the André the Giant Memorial Battle Royal, which was won by Mojo Rawley.

On April 10, both Rhyno and Slater were traded to Raw brand as part of the Superstar Shake-up. On the June 5 episode of Raw, Rhyno and Slater failed to win the Raw Tag Team Championship against Cesaro and Sheamus. On the October 30 episode of Raw, Rhyno and Slater defeated The Club in an All Hallow's Eve Trick or Street Fight. At the Royal Rumble on January 28, 2018, Rhyno participated in the Royal Rumble match as the third entrant, this was Rhyno's first appearance in 14 years at the namesake pay-per-view match but was eliminated by Baron Corbin. At WrestleMania 34, Rhyno competed in the André the Giant Memorial Battle Royal, but was unsuccessful. On the December 3 episode of Raw, General Manager Baron Corbin created a match between Rhyno and Slater, where the loser would be fired from Raw. Rhyno lost the match and was subsequently forced to leave the brand. After Corbin was removed from power, he returned to Raw to aid Slater against an attack from Jinder Mahal on the December 24 episode of Raw. The following week on Raw, Rhyno and Slater lost to Mahal and The Singh Brothers.

Following the December 31 episode of Raw, Rhyno again disappeared from WWE television. Over January and February 2019, he wrestled a handful of matches at WWE house shows, with the most recent being on February 24. He made a few cameo appearances on Raw without wrestling. His profile on WWE.com was moved to the Alumni section around this time. He returned to action in the Andre the Giant Memorial Battle Royal at WrestleMania 35, but following that he did not return to live events. On May 1, International Wrestling Cartel (IWC) announced that Rhyno would return there in 2019.

Rhyno later revealed that he decided to leave the company once his contract expired on July 17. This was his decision even though WWE offered him more than double his current downside guarantee. He declined the offer because he was not being used by the promotion and wanted to wrestle more often.

Rhyno showed up at an Impact Wrestling pay per view in a mask on July 7, while still under contract with WWE. Reports indicated that WWE did not have a significant issue with him doing this, and he would not be punished for it. Part of the reason for Rhyno's departure from the WWE, was the founding of his business, Big Daddy's Boat Yard.

=== Return to independent circuit (2019–present) ===
Rhino's first match back on the independent circuit was on July 26, for Sami Callihan's promotion The Wrestling Revolver. In the match he teamed with Tommy Dreamer, Eddie Edwards and Jimmy Jacobs against Ohio Versus Everything (Sami Callihan, Jake Crist, Dave Crist and Madman Fulton) in an Extreme rules Tornado tag match.

On October 10, 2020, at Xtreme Intense Championship Wrestling, Heath and Rhino defeated DBA and Jaimy Coxxx to become XICW Tag Team Champions, their first title win since becoming the inaugural SmackDown Tag Team Champions in 2016.

=== Second return to Impact Wrestling / TNA (2019–2024) ===
==== Return and various feuds (2019–2020) ====
On July 7, 2019, (whilst still under contract with WWE) he returned to TNA, now known as Impact Wrestling at Slammiversary XVII under disguise in all black and a black mask. Here, he attacked the heel Michael Elgin, who was assaulting Impact commentator and Executive Vice-president Don Callis. Following his release from WWE, he was then advertised for the August television tapings of Impact. On the July 26 episode of Impact, Rhino made his first Impact appearance since 2014, attacking Michael Elgin once again. On October 20, 2019, on Bound for Glory, he teamed with Rob Van Dam where they challenged for the Impact World Tag Team Championship. At the climax of the match, Van Dam turned heel by attacking Rhino, Willie Mack, and Rich Swann, losing the match in the process. At Hard To Kill he was defeated by Moose in a No Disqualification match.

==== Tag team championship reigns (2020–2024) ====
In 2020, after the debut of his former WWE tag team partner Heath at Slammiversary, Rhino and Heath began a campaign to convince the company to sign Heath. At Victory Road, Rhino and Heath teamed for the first time in Impact where they defeated Reno Scum. After the match, Scott D'Amore offered Heath a contract, then talks broke down. D'Amore eventually allowed Heath and Rhino to enter the Call Your Shot Gauntlet match at Bound for Glory, and if either man won, Heath would get his contract. If neither won, Rhino would be fired. At Bound for Glory Rhino won after entering from number 1 position. According to backstage reports, Heath was planned to win the match, but an injury suffered during the match forced Impact to change the finish with the same outcome.

At Sacrifice on March 13, 2021, Rhino joined Violent By Design (Eric Young, Deaner, and Joe Doering) by helping them defeat Chris Sabin and James Storm, turning heel. On the May 20 episode of Impact!, Rhino invoked his Call Your Shot Gauntlet championship privilege as he and Doering defeated FinJuice to win the Impact World Tag Team Championship. At Slammiversary, they lost the titles to The Good Brothers in a four-way tag team match. The following month at Emergence, they failed to regain the tag titles in a three-way tag team match. After that, Young blamed Rhino for failing to recapture the titles and they tortured him to cure him of "the sickness". On the September 16 episode of Impact!, Rhino was attacked by Young, Deaner, and Doering, thus kicking him out of the VBD. At Bound for Glory, after weeks of indecisiveness and silence, Rhino finally broke free from Violent By Design and rejoined his old tag team partner Heath. Following Bound for Glory, the two teams continued to wage war with each other, especially after Young revealed he recovered from his knee injury. Heath and Rhino decided to challenge VBD to one more match at Turning Point, which was accepted. At the event Rhino and Heath were defeated. On October 8, 2022, during the Impact! taping, Heath and Rhino defeated The Kingdom to become to the new Impact World Tag Team Champions. On the December 15, 2022 episode of Impact!, Rhino and Heath lost the titles to The Motor City Machine Guns.

At Bound for Glory, Rhino competed in a Monster's Ball match which was won by PCO. On the Turning Point preshow, Rhino and Grado defeated Ryan Richards and Mike D Vecchio. at Final Resolution, Rhino defeated Moose by disqualification which led to another match where Moose defeated Rhino in a Street Fight. At Hard To Kill, Rhino, Jake Something and PCO defeated Alpha Bravo, Oleg Prudius and Dirty Dango. On the Under Siege preshow, Rhino defeated VSK. At Bound for Glory, Rhino competed in the 20-person Intergender Call Your Shot Gauntlet where he made it to the final two being eliminated by Frankie Kazarian during the show he was also inducted into the TNA Hall of Fame. At Turning Point, Rhino competed in the Six-way Thanksgiving Turkey Bowl match which was won by Joe Hendry.

On December 13, 2024, Rhino announced that he would be parting ways with TNA and his final TNA match took place at the Impact TV taping from the next day.

=== National Wrestling Alliance (2025–present) ===
At Hard Times V, Rhino made his debut in the National Wrestling Alliance by confronting Thom Latimer after his match against Carson Bartholomew Drake. The NWA later announced that Rhino would challenge Latimer for the world title at the Crockett Cup, which took place at the 2300 Arena, in which he was unsuccessful alongside Colby Corino, who cashed in his World title shot.

=== All Elite Wrestling (2025) ===
On the May 7, 2025 episode of Dynamite, Rhino made his debut in All Elite Wrestling (AEW), unsuccessfully challenging Nick Wayne for the ROH World Television Championship.

== Professional wrestling style and persona ==
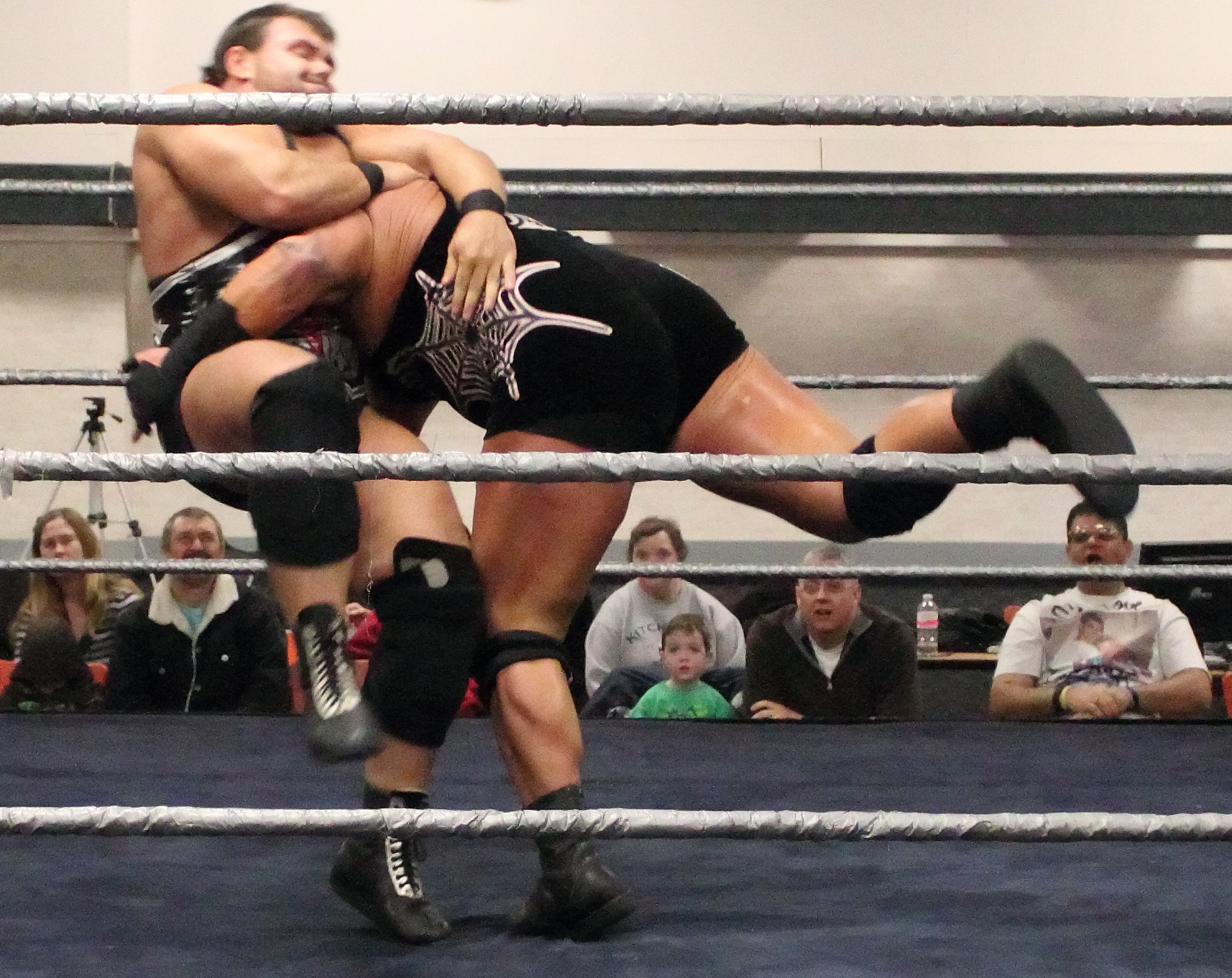
Rhino performing the Gore on Michael Elgin in 2011

Rhyno has been featured as an intimidating powerhouse with combined feats of strength and speed, known by various nicknames such as "The Rookie Monster", "The Big F'n Deal", "The Man Beast", "The War/Gore Machine" and "Dr. Kill". His finishing move during his early career was a spike piledriver called the Rhino Driver or the Rhino Spike, which he also used sometimes from the second rope or the ring apron. He later began using the Gore as his finishing move which has been associated with his career since then.

== Other media ==
Rhyno made his film debut in the 2011 horror film Death from Above, alongside fellow wrestler Kurt Angle. In 2024 he appeared in the comedy film My Little Sister's Wedding.

He made a cameo appearance in the music video for the 2013 Insane Clown Posse song "When I'm Clownin."

=== Professional wrestling games ===
Year	Title	Notes
2000	ECW Hardcore Revolution	First video game appearance
2000	ECW Anarchy Rulz	Cover athlete
2001	WWF SmackDown! Just Bring It	First WWF/E video game appearance
2002	WWE SmackDown! Shut Your Mouth	
2003	WWE SmackDown! Here Comes the Pain	
2004	WWE Day of Reckoning	
2004	WWE SmackDown! vs. Raw	
2005	WWE WrestleMania 21	
2008	TNA Impact!	
2017	WWE 2K18	First appearance in a WWE game in 12 years
2019	WWE 2K19	Last video game appearance

== Politics ==
Gerin announced on March 4, 2016, that he would run for the Michigan House of Representatives, running for the 15th District seat, which encompasses his hometown of Dearborn. He said he was a Republican and had the approval of Vince McMahon, whose wife, former WWE CEO Linda McMahon, had run in Connecticut for a United States Senate seat. Incumbent George Darany, a Democratic state representative, was not eligible to run for reelection due to term limits. On August 2, 2016, it was reported that Gerin had won the Republican primary and would face Democratic primary winner Abdullah Hammoud in November's general election. Gerin was defeated by Hammoud in the election, 21,739 to 13,452, a margin of 8,297 votes. On March 31, 2020, Gerin announced his run for Monroe Township Board of Trustee for Monroe Township, Michigan.

=== Electoral history ===
Michigan House of Representatives 15th District (Wayne County (part))
Party	Candidate	Votes	%
Republican	Terrance Guido Gerin	13,452	38.23%
Democratic	Abdullah Hammoud	21,739	61.77%
Total votes		35,191	100.00%
Turnout		35,191	

== Personal life ==
Gerin was previously married but divorced in 2005, he has one daughter.

Gerin is close friends with Adam Copeland and Jay Reso, best known by their ring names Edge and Christian. Following the SmackDown taping on September 16, 2011, Gerin made a one-night return to WWE as a part of an "Appreciation Night" to celebrate Edge's career. He also made an appearance at Edge's induction ceremony into the WWE Hall of Fame Class of 2012.

Gerin is an avid boater and in 2018 he bought his own marina in Monroe, Michigan called "Big Daddy's Boat Yard."

== Championships and accomplishments ==
- Border City Wrestling
  - BCW Can-Am Television Championship (1 time)
- Buckeye Championship Wrestling
  - BCW Championship (1 time)
- Canadian Wrestling's Elite
  - CWE Tag Team Championship (1 time) – with AJ Sanchez
- Catch Wrestling Association
  - CWA World Tag Team Championship (2 times) – with Joe Legend (1) and Jean-Pierre Lafitte (1)
- DDT Pro-Wrestling
  - Ironman Heavymetalweight Championship (1 time)
- DeMuro Wrestling Association
  - DWA Ultra Violent Championship (1 time)
- European Wrestling Promotion
  - EWP World Heavyweight Championship (1 time)
- Extreme Championship Wrestling
  - ECW World Heavyweight Championship (1 time)
  - ECW World Television Championship (2 times)
- Fire Pro Wrestling
  - FPW Heavyweight Championship (1 time)
- Insane Wrestling Revolution
  - IWR World Heavyweight Championship (1 time)
  - IWR World Tag Team Championship (1 time) – with Heath
- International Wrestling Cartel
  - IWC World Heavyweight Championship (1 time)
- Jersey All Pro Wrestling
  - JAPW Heavyweight Championship (1 time)
- Lancaster Championship Wrestling
  - LCW Heavyweight Championship (1 time)
- NWA Mid-South
  - NWA Mid-South Unified Heavyweight Championship (1 time)
- Ohio Valley Wrestling
  - OVW Television Championship (1 time)
- Pro Wrestling Epic
  - PWE Championship (1 time)
- Pure Pro Wrestling
  - PPW Michigan State Heavyweight Championship (1 time)
- Prime Time Wrestling
  - PTW Heavyweight Championship (1 time)
- Pro Wrestling Illustrated
  - Ranked No. 10 of the top 500 singles wrestlers in the PWI 500 in 2001
- Pro Wrestling Worldwide
  - PW3 Heavyweight Championship (1 time)
- Pure Wrestling Association
  - Carrot Cup (2015) – with Tommy Dreamer
- Rockstar Pro
  - Rockstar Pro Championship (1 time)
- Squared Circle Expo
  - SCX Tag Team Championship (1 time) – with Heath
- Wrestling Revolver
  - REVOLVER Rumble (2024)
- Total Nonstop Action Wrestling / Impact Wrestling
  - NWA World Heavyweight Championship (1 time)
  - Impact World Tag Team Championship (2 times) – with Eric Young, Joe Doering and Deaner (1) and Heath (1)
  - TNA Turkey Bowl (2008)
  - Gauntlet for the Gold (2005)
  - Call Your Shot Gauntlet (2020)
  - TNA Hall of Fame (2024)
- Ultimate Pro Wrestling
  - UPW Heavyweight Championship (1 time)
- Universal Championship Wrestling
  - UCW Heavyweight Championship (1 time)
- Universal Wrestling Alliance
  - UWA Tag Team Championship (1 time) – with Trevor Blanchard
- Universyl Wrestling Enterprises
  - UWE Heavyweight Championship (1 time)
- USA Xtreme Wrestling
  - UXW Heavyweight Championship (1 time)
- Wentworth Bros Entertainment
  - Verified World Championship (1 time, inaugural, current)
- World Series Wrestling
  - WSW Heavyweight Championship (1 time)
- World Wrestling Federation/WWE
  - WWF Hardcore Championship (3 times)
  - WCW United States Championship (1 time)
  - WWE SmackDown Tag Team Championship (1 time, inaugural) – with Heath Slater
  - WWE SmackDown Tag Team Championship Tournament (2016) – with Heath Slater
- Xtreme Intense Championship Wrestling
  - XICW Midwest Heavyweight Championship (4 times)
  - XICW Tag Team Championship (1 time) – with Heath
  - XICW Proving Ground Tag Team Championship (1 time) – with DBA
- Xtreme Wrestling Alliance
  - XWA Heavyweight Championship (1 time)
