= List of mayors of Dearborn, Michigan =

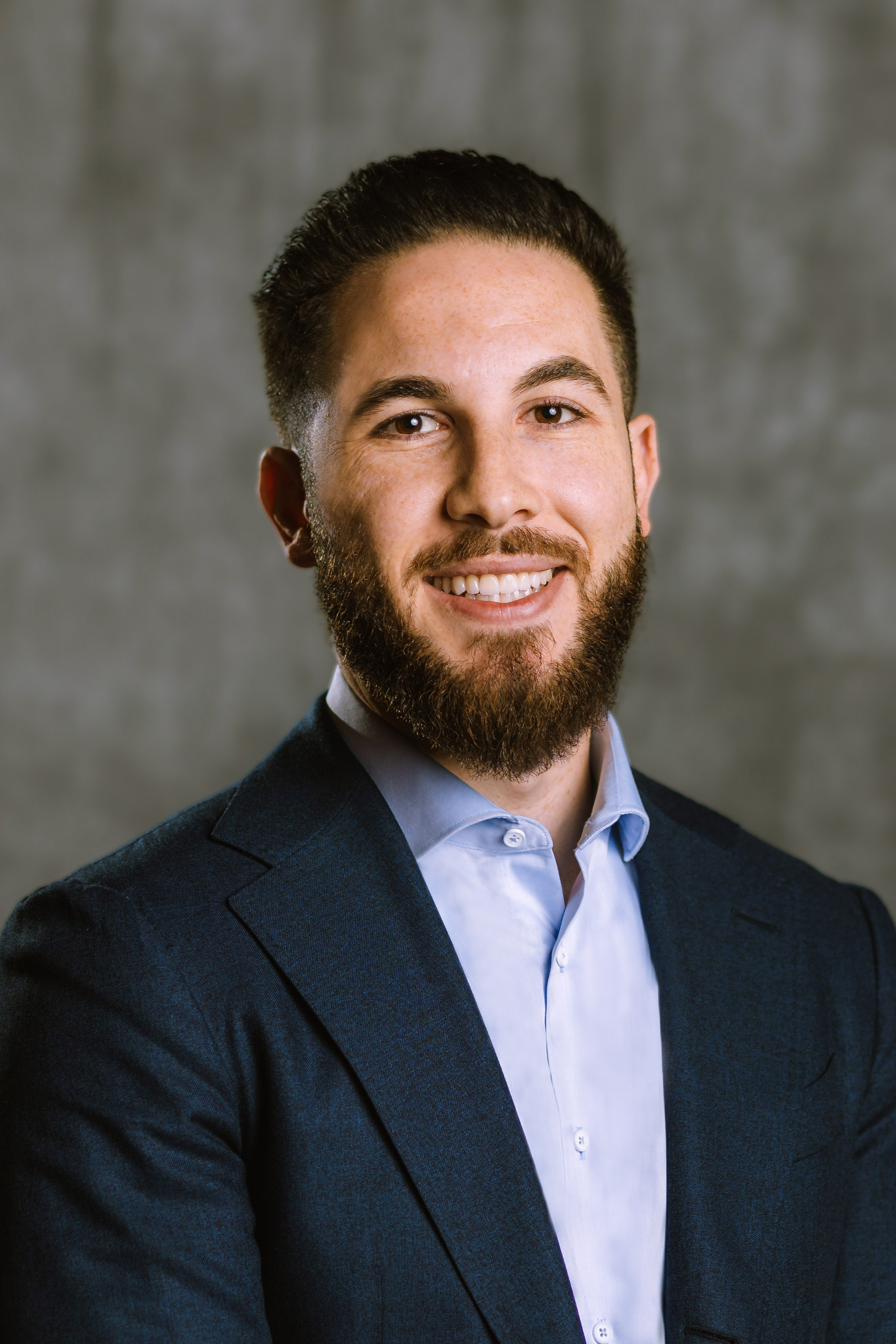
Current mayor Abdullah Hammoud

The office of mayor of Dearborn, Michigan originated in the consolidation of various municipalities in Dearborn Township into the City of Dearborn in 1927 following fear of absorption into rapidly growing Detroit. Earlier, in 1919, also fearing being absorbed by Detroit, neighboring Springwells Township consolidated itself into the village of Springwells and became a city in 1923. In 1925 the city of Springwells would rename itself the city of Fordson and with a renewed fear of absorption into Detroit voted to consolidate into Dearborn in 1928.

Notable mayors include: Michael Guido who served as the 64th President of the United States Conference of Mayors, and the current mayor Abdullah Hammoud who is the city's first Arab American mayor.

== List of Mayors of Springwells/Fordson ==
Mayor	Term begins	Term ends	Notes
Joseph M. Karmann	1923	1928	Lead the effort to consolidate the municipalities of the township into a single city. He led the city through the Great Depression working closely with Henry Ford, who he renamed the city in honor of in 1925.
Floyd Yinger	1928	1928	A financial expert, he led the commission to write the charter for merger with Dearborn. As part of the merger he ran against Dearborn's mayor, Clyde Ford, and lost.

== List of Mayors of Dearborn ==
Mayor	Term begins	Term ends	Notes
Clyde Ford	1927	1935	City's first mayor. Henry Ford's cousin. Helped facilitate the merger of Fordson into Dearborn in 1928. Defeated Fordson's mayor, Floyd Yinger, in the 1928 consolidation election. He refused re-election to a fourth term in 1935 to run for a seat on the city council.
John Carey	1935	1941	Mayor during the Battle of the Overpass, notably refused to have the Dearborn police intervene in the fight between Ford Security officers and Strikers.
Orville L. Hubbard	January 6, 1942	January 1, 1978	Infamous segregationist. Ran on a campaign of "keep the Negroes out of Dearborn." [Needs documentation.] Also oversaw the construction of Camp Dearborn and Dearborn towers.
John O'Reilly, Sr.	1978	1986	World War II and Korean War veteran. Focused his tenure on fighting crime in the southern portion of the city.
Michael Guido	1986	December 5, 2006	Known for his long-standing feud with the city's Arab American population. Served as the 64th President of the United States Conference of Mayors and died of cancer during his 7th term in 2006.
John O'Reilly Jr.	February 27, 2007	January 1, 2022	Son of former mayor John O'Reilly, Sr. Became mayor by winning a special election after Guido's death. Sought to turn the city into a regional transportation hub, his mental state rapidly deteriorated with age during his last term forcing his retirement.
Abdullah Hammoud	January 1, 2022	Incumbent	First Arab American mayor of Dearborn, defeating politician and newspaper editor Gary Woronchak in the 2021 election.
