= 2025 Dearborn mayoral election =

Municipal election in Michigan, US

- November 4, 2025
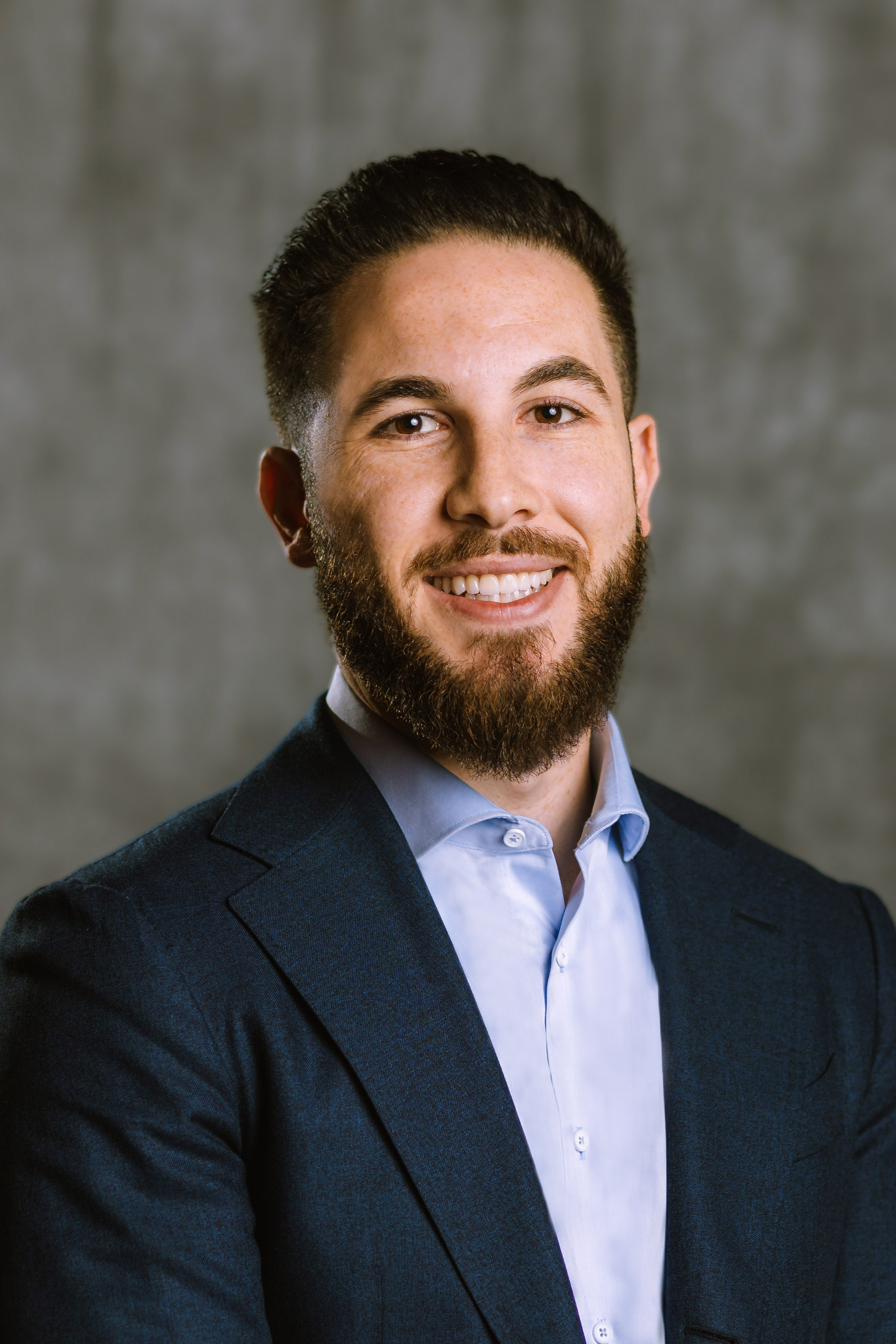
Candidate	Abdullah Hammoud	Nagi Almudhegi
Party	Democratic	Nonpartisan
Popular vote	18,531	7,294
Percentage	71.4%	28.1%
Mayor before election
Abdullah Hammoud
Democratic
Elected mayor
Abdullah Hammoud
Democratic

The 2025 Dearborn mayoral election took place on November 4, 2025. Incumbent Mayor Abdullah Hammoud, who was first elected in the 2021 Dearborn mayoral election, ran for re-election against IT manager Nagi Almudhegi. Because only two candidates filed for the election, the primary election was cancelled. Though the election was formally nonpartisan, Hammoud is a Democrat, and was a leader in the 2024 Uncommitted National Movement, while Almudhegi is a Republican, and supported by prominent Michigan Republicans. Hammoud was re-elected with 71.4% of the popular vote, an improvement of roughly 16.8% from his victory in the final round of the 2021 Dearborn mayoral election.

== Candidates ==
=== Declared ===
- Abdullah Hammoud, incumbent Mayor (Democratic)
- Nagi Almudhegi, IT manager (Republican)

=== Disqualified ===
- Hassan Aoun, conservative activist (Note: Aoun was disqualified due to a previous felony conviction.)

== Endorsements ==
Nagi Almudhegi (R)

Local officials

- Hussein Berry, former at-large Dearborn Public Schools board member (2017–2025) (Democratic)
- Amer Ghalib, mayor of Hamtramck (2021–present) (Democratic)

Individuals

- Hassan Aoun, conservative activist and former candidate
- Tudor Dixon, political commentator and nominee for governor in 2022
Abdullah Hammoud (D)

Local officials

- Michael Sareini, at-large (2014–present) president of the Dearborn city council (2022–present)

Organizations

- Council on American–Islamic Relations Action
- Dearborn Area Association of Realtors
- Emgage Action Michigan
- New American Leaders Action Fund

Political parties

- Dearborn Democratic Party

== Results ==
2025 Dearborn mayoral election
Candidate	Votes	%
Abdullah Hammoud (incumbent)	18,531	71.4%
Nagi Almudhegi	7,294	28.1%
Total votes		
