= Jalal Abdallah =

American politician

Member-elect of the Michigan House of Representatives from the 15th district
- Assuming office January 2027
- Succeeding: Erin Byrnes

Personal details
- Party: Democratic

Jalal Abdallah is an American politician. A member of the Democratic Party, he is the member-elect for the 15th district of the Michigan House of Representatives.
