= Gino Polidori =

American politician from Michigan

Gino H. Polidori

Member of the Michigan House of Representatives from the 15th district
- In office January 1, 2005 – December 31, 2010
- Preceded by: Gary Woronchak
- Succeeded by: George Darany

Personal details
- Born: July 23, 1941 Dearborn, Michigan
- Died: January 26, 2014 (aged 72) Dearborn, Michigan
- Party: Democratic
- Spouse: Betty Polidori
- Relations: 5 (grandchildren)
- Children: 3
- Education: Wayne State University

Gino H. Polidori (July 23, 1941 – January 26, 2014) was an American politician from the State of Michigan. He served a member of the Michigan House of Representatives. He was a Democrat and he represented the 15th district, which is located in Wayne County and includes the city of Dearborn.

== Early life through 1996 ==
Born in Dearborn, Michigan, Polidori attended Fordson High School. He received his bachelor's degree from Wayne State University. He enlisted in the United States Army in 1964. He served for two years. He was Dearborn's fire chief from 1974 through 1996. He was a member and president of the Dearborn Goodfellows, Italian American Fraternal Club, Dearborn Pioneers Club, the Fordson Varsity Alumni Club and the American Legion Post 364.

== Political career ==
He served on the Dearborn City Council from 1996 to 2004. He was first elected to the Michigan House in 2004, and was re-elected in 2006, and served until 2010. He served as the Chairman of the Military and Veterans Affairs & Homeland Security Committee in the House, and as a member of the Education, Government Operations, and Insurance Committees.

=== Electoral history ===
- 2006 campaign for State House
  - Gino Polidori (D), 76%
  - Abbas Ghasham (R), 24%
- 2004 campaign for State House
  - Gino Polidori (D), 64%
  - Doug Thomas (R), 35%

== Death ==
Polidori battled prostate cancer for the last 12 years of his life. His health declined in 2013 and he died at the age of 72 in 2014. He was survived by his wife Betty and their three children. The Michigan House of Representatives adopted a memorial resolution for Polidori on February 20, 2014.
