= Erin Byrnes =

American politician

Member of the Michigan House of Representatives from the 15th district
- Incumbent
- Assumed office January 1, 2023
- Preceded by: Jeffrey Pepper
- Succeeded by: Jalal Abdallah (elect)

Personal details
- Born: Dearborn, Michigan, U.S.
- Party: Democratic
- Education: University of Michigan–Dearborn (BA); Brooklyn College (MS)

Erin Byrnes is an American politician and educator serving as a member of the Michigan House of Representatives since 2023, representing the 15th district. She is a member of the Democratic Party.

== Early life and education ==
Byrnes was born and raised in Dearborn, Michigan. She earned a Bachelor of Arts degree in women's and gender studies from the University of Michigan–Dearborn and a Master of Science in education from Brooklyn College.

== Career ==
From 2008 to 2010, Byrnes worked as a special education teacher in the New York City Department of Education. From 2012 to 2016, she was the director of the America Reads program at the University of Michigan. From 2016-2022, she worked as the lead for democratic engagement, managing non-partisan student voter education and programming at the University of Michigan. Byrnes served as a member of the Dearborn City Council from 2018 to 2022. She was first elected in November 2017 and after running for re-election in 2021, she earned the position of Council President Pro-Tem. She was elected to the Michigan House of Representatives in November 2022. She was reelected in 2024.
