= Agnes Dobronski =

American politician from Michigan

Member of the Michigan House of Representatives from the 15th district 31st district (1991-1992)
- In office January 1, 1991 – December 31, 1998
- Preceded by: Bill Runco
- Succeeded by: Gary Woronchak

Member of the Michigan House of Representatives from the 31st district
- In office January 1, 1987 – December 31, 1988
- Preceded by: Bill Runco
- Succeeded by: Bill Runco

Personal details
- Born: April 21, 1925
- Died: December 27, 2013 (aged 88)
- Resting place: Woodmere Cemetery
- Spouse: Jim Cichocki
- Occupation: Politician

Agnes Marie Dobronski (April 21, 1925 – December 27, 2013) was an American educator and politician.

Born in Detroit, Dobronski began working for the Dearborn Public Schools as a secretary and rose to become district's business manager in a career spanning 37 years. Doronski later served on the Dearborn Public Schools Board of Education. She attended Detroit College of Business and Dearborn College of Business and later received her bachelor's and master's degrees from Eastern Michigan University and also taught at the university. Dobronski served in the Michigan House of Representatives, as a Democrat from 1987 to 1988 and from 1991 to 1998. Dobronski was married to Jim Cichoski. She died in Dearborn, Michigan.
