= Michigan's 15th House of Representatives district =

American legislative district

Michigan's 15th State House of Representatives district
Representative
Erin Byrnes; D–Dearborn
- Demographics: 82.6% White; 7.4% Black; 5.3% Hispanic; 1% Asian; 0.2% Other; 3.5% Multiracial
- Population (2024): 92,107

Michigan's 15th House of Representatives district is a legislative district within the Michigan House of Representatives located in Wayne County. The district was created in 1965, when the Michigan Supreme Court ordered the reapportionment of state legislative districts from a county-based system to a proportional one following the Supreme Court case Reynolds v. Sims. It is currently represented by Democrat Erin Byrnes of Dearborn.

== List of representatives ==
Representative	Party	Years	Residence	Notes
Jack Faxon	Democratic	1965–1970	Detroit	
Alma Grace Stallworth	Democratic	1971–1972	Detroit	Redistricted to the 4th district.
James Bradley	Democratic	1973	Detroit	Redistricted from the 8th district; resigned November 1973 after being elected city clerk of Detroit.
Joseph F. Young Sr.	Democratic	1974 (Note: Elected in a 1974 special election to replace Rep. James Bradley, who resigned.)–1978	Detroit	
Joseph F. Young Jr.	Democratic	1979–1992	Detroit	Redistricted to the 4th district.
Agnes M. Dobronski	Democratic	1993–1998	Dearborn	Redistricted from the 31st district; term limited.
Gary Woronchak	Republican	1999–2004	Dearborn	Term limited.
Gino Polidori	Democratic	2005–2010	Dearborn	Term limited.
George Darany	Democratic	2011–2016	Dearborn	Term limited.
Abdullah Hammoud	Democratic	2017–2021	Dearborn	Resigned December 2021 after being elected mayor of Dearborn.
Jeffrey Pepper	Democratic	2022 (Note: Elected in a 2022 special election to replace Rep. Abdullah Hammoud, who resigned.)	Dearborn	
Erin Byrnes	Democratic	2023–present	Dearborn	
Jalal Abdallah	Democratic	(Note: Member-elect.)		

== Historical district boundaries ==
Map	Description	Apportionment Plan	Notes
	Wayne County (part): Detroit (part)	1964 Apportionment Plan (Note: Referred to as the Austin-Kleiner plan.)	
	Wayne County (part): Detroit (part)	1972 Apportionment Plan (Note: Referred to as the Hatcher-Kleiner plan.)	
	Wayne County (part): Detroit (part)	1982 Apportionment Plan	
	Wayne County (part): Dearborn	1992 Apportionment Plan	
	Wayne County (part): Dearborn (part)	2001 Apportionment Plan	
	Wayne County (part): Dearborn (part)	2011 Apportionment Plan	
	Wayne County (part): Dearborn (part); Dearborn Heights (part)	2021 Apportionment Plan (Note: Referred to as the Hickory plan.)	

== Recent elections ==
=== 2020s ===
2026 Michigan House of Representatives election
Party	Candidate	Votes	%
Democratic	Jalal Abdallah	26,203	72.44
Republican	Hassan H Nehme	9,970	27.56
Total votes		36,173	100
Democratic hold			

2024 Michigan House of Representatives election
Party	Candidate	Votes	%
Democratic	Erin Byrnes (incumbent)	19,974	56.29
Republican	Gary Edward Gardner	15,512	43.71
Total votes		35,486	100
Democratic hold			

2022 Michigan House of Representatives election
Party	Candidate	Votes	%
Democratic	Erin Byrnes	17,864	61.64
Republican	Steven J. Mackie	11,119	38.36
Total votes		28,983	100
Democratic hold			

2022 Michigan House of Representatives 15th district special election
Party	Candidate	Votes	%
Democratic	Jeffrey D. Pepper	4,628	72.53
Republican	Ginger L. Shearer	1,748	27.39
Write-In		5	0.08
Total votes		6,381	100
Democratic hold			

2020 Michigan House of Representatives election
Party	Candidate	Votes	%
Democratic	Abdullah Hammoud (incumbent)	28,362	70.49
Republican	Carla O'Neill	10,906	27.1
Working Class	Larry Darnell Betts	970	2.41
Total votes		40,238	100
Democratic hold			

=== 2010s ===
2018 Michigan House of Representatives election
Party	Candidate	Votes	%
Democratic	Abdullah Hammoud (incumbent)	20,634	68.6
Republican	Doug Mitchell	9,445	31.4
Total votes		30,079	100
Democratic hold			

2016 Michigan House of Representatives election
Party	Candidate	Votes	%
Democratic	Abdullah Hammoud	21,739	61.77
Republican	Terrance Guido Gerin	13,452	38.23
Total votes		35,191	100
Democratic hold			

2014 Michigan House of Representatives election
Party	Candidate	Votes	%
Democratic	George T. Darany (incumbent)	15,009	67.53
Republican	Johnnie Salemassi	7,216	32.47
Total votes		22,225	100
Democratic hold			

2012 Michigan House of Representatives election
Party	Candidate	Votes	%
Democratic	George T. Darany (incumbent)	26,465	75.04
Republican	Priscilla Parness	8,804	24.96
Total votes		35,269	100
Democratic hold			

2010 Michigan House of Representatives election
Party	Candidate	Votes	%
Democratic	George T. Darany	12,408	52.5
Republican	Suzanne Sareini	10,221	43.24
U.S. Taxpayers'	Daryl Smith	1,007	4.26
Total votes		23,636	100
Democratic hold			

=== 2000s ===
2008 Michigan House of Representatives election
Party	Candidate	Votes	%
Democratic	Gino H. Polidori (incumbent)	28,606	77.53
Republican	J. Scott Saionz	8,292	22.47
Total votes		36,898	100
Democratic hold			

2006 Michigan House of Representatives election
Party	Candidate	Votes	%
Democratic	Gino H. Polidori (incumbent)	21,391	76
Republican	Abbas Ghasham	6,755	24
Total votes		28,146	100
Democratic hold			

2004 Michigan House of Representatives election
Party	Candidate	Votes	%
Democratic	Gino H. Polidori	23,923	64.68
Republican	Doug Thomas	13,063	35.32
Total votes		36,986	100
Democratic gain from Republican			

2002 Michigan House of Representatives election
Party	Candidate	Votes	%
Republican	Gary Woronchak (incumbent)	19,227	100
Total votes		19,227	100
Republican hold			

2000 Michigan House of Representatives election
Party	Candidate	Votes	%
Republican	Gary Woronchak (incumbent)	20,356	54.25
Democratic	Amanda L. Howe	16,067	42.82
Libertarian	Gregory Stempfle	1,097	2.92
Total votes		37,520	100
Republican hold			

=== 1990s ===
1998 Michigan House of Representatives election
Party	Candidate	Votes	%
Republican	Gary Woronchak	15,827	51.33
Democratic	Maureen Keane-Doran	13,817	44.81
Libertarian	Gregory Stempfle	1,188	3.85
Total votes		30,832	100
Republican gain from Democratic			
