= Jeffrey Pepper =

American politician

Member of the Michigan House of Representatives from the 15th district
- In office May 10, 2022 – January 1, 2023
- Preceded by: Abdullah Hammoud
- Succeeded by: Erin Byrnes

Personal details
- Party: Democratic
- Other political affiliations: Republican (1974)
- Children: 5
- Education: Michigan State University (BA); Wayne State University (JD)

Jeffrey D. Pepper is an American attorney and politician who served as a member of the Michigan House of Representatives from the 15th district from 2022 to 2023.

== Early life and education ==
A native of Dearborn, Michigan, Pepper graduated from Dearborn High School in 1970. He earned a Bachelor of Arts degree in communications from Michigan State University in 1974 and a Juris Doctor from the Wayne State University Law School in 1977.

== Political career ==
Pepper has worked as a lawyer and mediator in Dearborn for 45 years. After graduating from Michigan State in 1974, Pepper won the Republican nomination for the 22nd district of the Wayne County Commission, but was unsuccessful in the general election. Pepper was the president of the Wayne County Family Bar Association and Dearborn Bar Association. He served as a member of the Dearborn Civil Service Commission and Dearborn Police and Fire Pension System Board. After Abdullah Hammoud resigned from the Michigan House of Representatives to become mayor of Dearborn, Pepper was elected in a special election to succeed him.

Jeffrey Pepper supports gun control and in 2023 supported a bill to ban assault weapons.
