= Abdullah Hammoud =

American politician (born 1990)

- عبدالله حمود
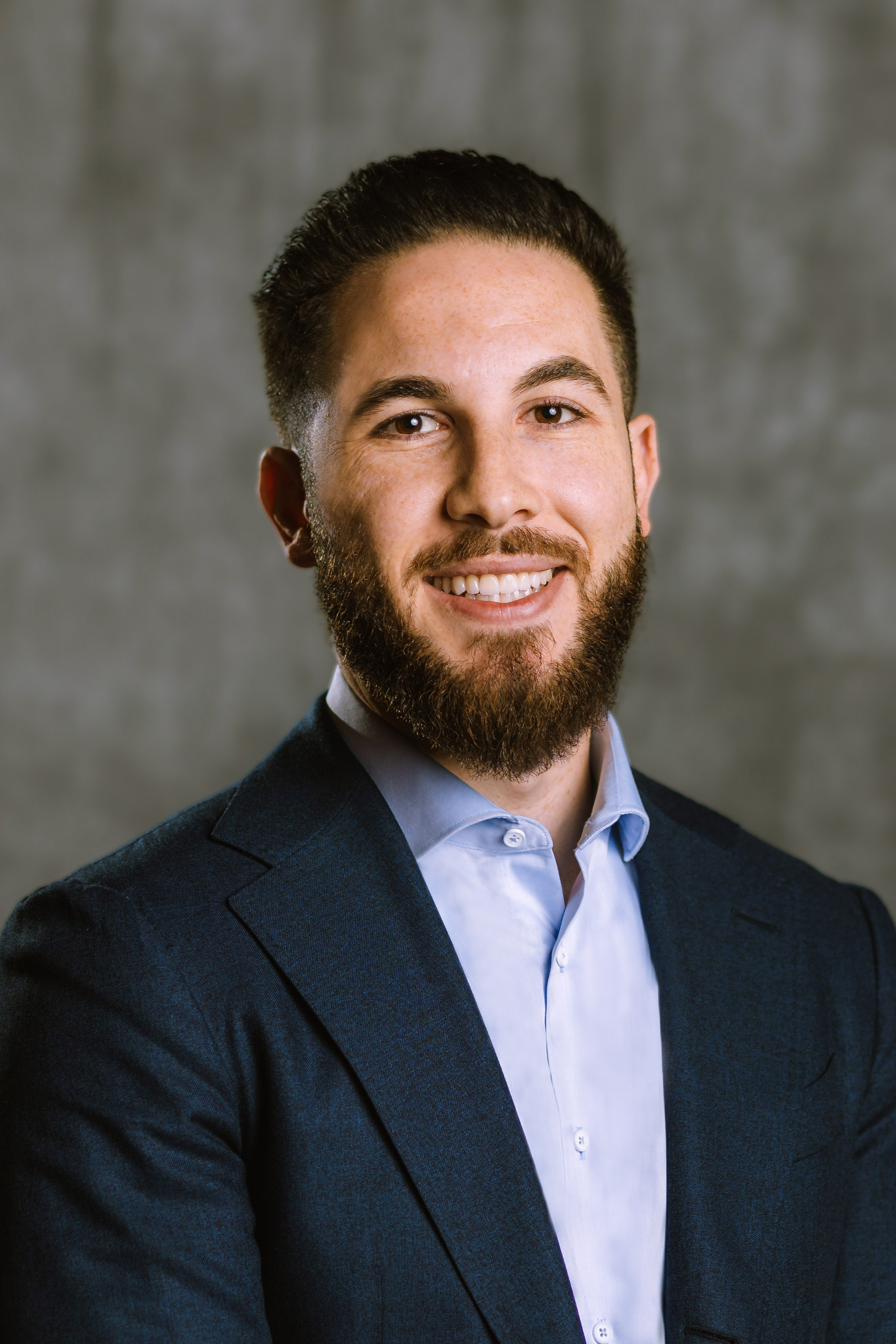
- Official portrait, 2024

Mayor of Dearborn
- Incumbent
- Assumed office January 1, 2022
- Preceded by: John B. O'Reilly Jr.

Member of the Michigan House of Representatives from the 15th district
- In office January 1, 2017 – December 29, 2021
- Preceded by: George Darany
- Succeeded by: Jeffrey Pepper

Personal details
- Born: Abdullah Hussein Hammoud; March 19, 1990 (age 36) Dearborn, Michigan, U.S.
- Party: Democratic
- Education: University of Michigan, Dearborn (BS); University of Michigan (MPH, MBA)

Abdullah Hussein Hammoud (Arabic: عبدالله حُسَيْن حمود; born March 19, 1990) is an American politician serving as the 7th mayor of Dearborn, Michigan, since 2022. A member of the Democratic Party, Hammoud had previously served in the Michigan House of Representatives, representing the 15th district from 2017 to 2021. He won re‑election on November 4, 2025, defeating Nagi Almudhegi with about 71–72 percent of the vote.

Hammoud is the first Arab-American, Lebanese-American and first Muslim mayor of Dearborn as well as the second-youngest mayor in the city's history. His election is considered historic as the city is home to one of the largest Middle Eastern and Muslim populations per capita in the United States.

== Early life and education ==
Hammoud was born in Dearborn, Michigan, to a Lebanese Shia Muslim family. His father worked as a truck driver and his mother, who had not completed high school, further pursued her education and became a small-business owner. Hammoud earned a Bachelor of Science in biology from the University of Michigan-Dearborn, a Master of Public Health in epidemiology and genetics from the University of Michigan Ann Arbor, and a Master of Business Administration from the Ross School of Business, on the same campus. Hammoud's dreams of medical school were cut short following numerous rejections, thus redirecting him to work for Professor Marianne Udow-Williams at the Center for Health and Research Transformation at the University of Michigan. In the midst of his work, Hammoud took a sabbatical so he could volunteer with the United Nations in Jordan. Upon his return to Michigan, Hammoud found employment with the Henry Ford Health System. Hammoud's brother Ali died when he was 25 years old. Ali's death inspired Hammoud to run for the 15th District Seat in the Michigan State House.

== Michigan House of Representatives ==
At 26, then a healthcare advisor at the Henry Ford Health System, when Hammoud decided to run for office following the unexpected death of his older brother, Hammoud defeated Republican nominee Terrance Guido Gerin, a WWE professional wrestler in the general election for Michigan's 15th District, by a margin of 61% to 38%. Upon his election, Hammoud became the first Arab American and Muslim to represent the 15th district. Hammoud concentrated on environmental issues, healthcare access, criminal justice reform, education, economic opportunity, workers' rights, and social justice during his time in office.

=== Tenure ===
Abdullah Hammoud’s environmental protection efforts were guided through his work as a member of the Michigan League of Conservation Voters in 2014 and the work he had done under a lecturer at the University of Michigan's department of Health Management and Policy. This blend of public health and environmental experience were utilized to shape his goals during his time as a member of the Michigan House of Representatives. Hammoud focused on the air and water quality in the district, especially the Southend neighborhood, “a predominantly low income Arab American”, which has been affected by industrial pollution from the automobile industry, steel corporations, and natural gas plants since the 1950s. Hammoud’s primary legislative focus was on the reduction of pollution and strengthening of environmental regulations in the area he represented. He advocated for legislation in accordance with this such as the Clean, Renewable, and Efficient Energy Act, HB 5143 & 5680 (solar tax incentive), SB 1244 (contaminated site cleanup), HB 4465 & 4069 (property tax exemptions for alternative energy), and the HB 4444 (Broken Bottle Bill), aimed at improving recycling practices through the reduction of waste.

Hammoud backed Senator Bernie Sanders in the 2020 Democratic Party presidential primaries.

When President Joe Biden visited a Ford factory in Dearborn during the 2021 Israel–Palestine crisis, Hammoud gave him a letter calling for a ceasefire and a re-evaluation of the Israel–United States relationship.

== Mayor of Dearborn ==
=== 2021 campaign ===
On January 25, 2021, Hammoud announced he would run for Mayor of Dearborn. His campaign focused on a five-part proposal aiming to aid the working class. This proposal centered on lowering property taxes, promoting new development in housing and commercial industries, increasing city funds, and improving the city's operations. He also proposed plans to address issues concerning city pensions, infrastructure, driving, healthcare, economic recovery after the pandemic, and two issues the election had a large focus on: policing and flooding.

During the repeated flooding of Dearborn in the summer of 2021, Hammoud organized around 600 volunteers to assist in cleaning up damages done to homes in the area. His campaign also discussed changes to the police force and increasing mental health resources for the public. This would include relocating police resources to shift focus from non-moving traffic violations to more serious violations, namely reckless driving and speeding. A statistic from his campaign reported that Black drivers were given 60% of the total non-moving traffic citations from 2010–2019.

Election night results on the August 3 primary showed him in first with 50% followed by Susan Dabaja with 15.6% and Tom Tafelski with 13.5%. Hammoud finished first and he advanced to a November 2 general election against Gary Woronchak. In the November election, Hammoud won the race for mayor with 54.6% of the vote. This made him the first Arab American and first Muslim mayor of Dearborn, as well as being the only new mayor in 14 years. His term began January 1, 2022.

=== Tenure ===
One of Hammoud's first actions as mayor of Dearborn was to establish a local health department. The city became the first in Michigan to set up such a department voluntarily. Hammoud also sought reforms to the city's police force, including the elimination of employment policies prohibiting beards, tattoos and loose hair, in an effort to increase diversity. In addition, he instructed officers to focus on dangerous traffic violations rather than stopping vehicles for suspicious activity. Hammoud credits his reforms as having led to a 50 percent decrease in the proportion of tickets issued to Black drivers and a 10 percent decrease in the number of car accidents in the city.

Hammoud has also pushed for investments in water and sewer infrastructure, parks, and green spaces. Around the start of his term, he instructed the city to conduct an analysis of its water infrastructure over a span of two years to assist with solving the flooding problems in the Dearborn area. In the meantime, Hammoud and the city of Dearborn have sought grants from both state and federal agencies and have created multiple proposals, one such as the Colson Palmer Stormwater Line Project. This project involves the construction of new infrastructure around that stormwater line, as well as removing sediment and debris from it, as Hammoud stated that it decreases the line's capacity by approximately 50%. They claim these changes could help prevent water spillage into unwanted areas when the stormline becomes overwhelmed. He has also advocated for a reduction in available parking requirements for new construction projects as part of another flood mitigation strategy for the city.

Hammoud drew wide criticism after an exchange at a City Council meeting about a sign honoring Osama Siblani. A local pastor, Edward Barham, questioned whether the sign is appropriate, stating Siblani seems to support Hezbollah. Siblani said he does not want to be involved in this matter, and his statements supporting Palestinians did not mention Hezbollah or Hamas. Hammoud responded to Barham by saying "you are a bigot, and you are a racist, and you are an Islamophobe. Although you live here, I want you to know, as mayor, you are not welcome here." adding, “And the day you move out of the city will be the day that I launch a parade celebrating the fact that you moved out of the city because you are not somebody who believes in coexistence.” Addressing the matter later, Hammoud did not apologize for his comments.

=== 2025 Dearborn mayoral election ===
Only two candidates filed for the 2025 mayoral race, so the city canceled the August primary. Hammoud faced IT manager Nagi Almudhegi. Coverage centered on public safety, reckless driving, flooding, and city finances. Candidates raised more than $900,000 combined. The city clerk reported turnout of about 34 percent, with 26,926 ballots cast, and 25,953 mayor votes counted. Hammoud delivered a victory speech at the Bint Jebail Cultural Center.

=== Controveries ===
In September 2026, journalist Margot Cleveland sued Hammoud and the city of Dearborn claiming violation of the Establishment Clause of the U.S. Constitution for using city funds to support Islamic holidays but not allowing the same for Christian and Jewish holidays. The complaint states “Defendant Hammoud has taken this hostility to the next level, openly conveying the message that Christians and Jews are not welcome in the city and are, indeed, second-class citizens." The city denied the charges.

== National issues ==
=== 2024 presidential election ===
Because of the Biden administration's stance on the Gaza war, Mayor Hammoud declined an invitation to meet with Biden campaign officials before the president's withdrawal from the 2024 US presidential race. Explaining his decision on X, Hammoud wrote, "I will not entertain conversations about elections while we watch a live-streamed genocide backed by our government."

=== Gaza war ===
Hammoud spoke at a rally protesting the September 2024 Israeli attacks against Lebanon in 2024 alongside activist Osama Siblani, where "death to Israel" chants were made and Hassan Nasrallah was praised. At the 2024 Quds Day rally in Dearborn, Michigan, some members of the crowd chanted "death to America" in response to anti-America rhetoric by one of the speakers. Hammoud later said the chants were "unacceptable and contrary to the heart of this city."

On November 20, 2024, Hammoud vowed to arrest Benjamin Netanyahu and his former defense chief for war crimes if they enter Dearborn's city jurisdictions. This vow came after the International Criminal Court issued arrest warrants.

== Personal life ==
Hammoud is married to Fatima Beydoun, a physician. In December 2021, they had their first child.
