= Michael Guido =

American politician (1954–2006)

5th Mayor of Dearborn
- In office 1986 – December 5, 2006
- Preceded by: John O'Reilly Sr.
- Succeeded by: John B. O'Reilly Jr.

64th President of the United States Conference of Mayors
- In office 2006–2006
- Preceded by: Beverly O'Neill
- Succeeded by: Douglas Palmer

Dearborn City Councilmen
- In office 1978–1986

Personal details
- Born: July 3, 1954
- Died: December 5, 2006 (aged 52) Dearborn, Michigan, U.S.
- Party: Republican
- Spouse: Kari Guido
- Children: 2
- Occupation: Mayor

Michael A. Guido (July 3, 1954 – December 5, 2006) was an American politician who served as the 5th mayor of Dearborn, Michigan from 1986 until his death in 2006. He also was appointed to serve as the 64th President of the United States Conference of Mayors for the 2006 to 2007 term, but due to his death John B. O'Reilly Jr. finished Guido's term.

== Career ==
=== Dearborn City Council ===
Guido's political career started in 1978 when he was elected to the Dearborn city council as a Republican. At the age of 23 he was the youngest ever person elected to the city council. He was re-elected to a second term, and resigned from the council following his election as mayor in 1986.

=== Mayor of Dearborn ===
Michael Guido became the youngest mayor of Dearborn in 1986. After narrowly defeating Democrat city council president Marge Powell, he would be reelected six times. Guido's last election victory, in 2005, was the second in which he ran unopposed. As mayor Guido is best known for his early clashes with the community leaders of the city's growing Arab American population, with almost all the challengers in his mayoral campaigns being Arab-Americans. However, following the September 11 attacks, Guido reconciled with his longtime adversaries stating that "We Stand United Against Terror". His crowning achievement as mayor was redevelopment, part of which included building the Ford Community & Performing Arts Center, the largest municipally owned Performing Arts Center in the nation. He also was known for his jovial and outgoing nature, earning him the nickname "mayor friendly."

=== United States Conference of Mayors ===
Guido was selected to serve as the 64th President of the United States Conference of Mayors for its 2006 to 2007 term. He embarked on a goodwill tour to numerous cities in the conference. However, his tenure was cut short due to his cancer diagnoses.

== Death ==
After serving as mayor for 21 years, Guido was diagnosed with cancer, and he eventually succumbed to the disease during his 7th term on December 5, 2006. Following his death John D. Dingell extended condolences to his family on behalf of Congress.

== Personal life ==
Michael Guido was the child of Italian immigrants and a lifelong Roman Catholic. He was married to Kari Guido, and had two sons Michael and Anthony.
