= Riley Montana =

Fashion model (b. 1990)

- Born: Ebony Riley; August 6, 1990 (age 36); Detroit, Michigan, U.S.
- Years active: 2014-present
- Modeling information
- Height: 1.76 m (5 ft 9 1/2 in)
- Hair color: Black
- Eye color: Brown
- Agency: IMG Models (New York, London); LA Model Management (Los Angeles) (mother agency)

Riley Montana (born Ebony Riley) is an American fashion model and singer-songwriter.

== Early life ==
Montana was born in Detroit, Michigan, as Ebony Riley. She also lived in Southfield, Michigan. Before modeling, she got a nursing degree and worked jobs at places like Sprint in Los Angeles, California.

== Career ==
Montana's first fashion job was a Givenchy campaign. She has walked the runway for Marc Jacobs, Balmain, Oscar de la Renta, Rodarte, Bottega Veneta, Nina Ricci, and Tory Burch. She has also walked for Anna Sui, DKNY, Dolce & Gabbana, Moschino, Rodarte, Tommy Hilfiger, and Zac Posen.

Montana has appeared in campaigns for Brandon Maxwell, Balmain, MAC Cosmetics, Reebok, Marc Jacobs, Pyer Moss, and Tom Ford.

In 2022, Montana embarked on a career as a singer-songwriter. On February 1, 2023, she released her debut EP ebony under her birth name.
