= Cordaro Stewart =

American rapper (born 1990)

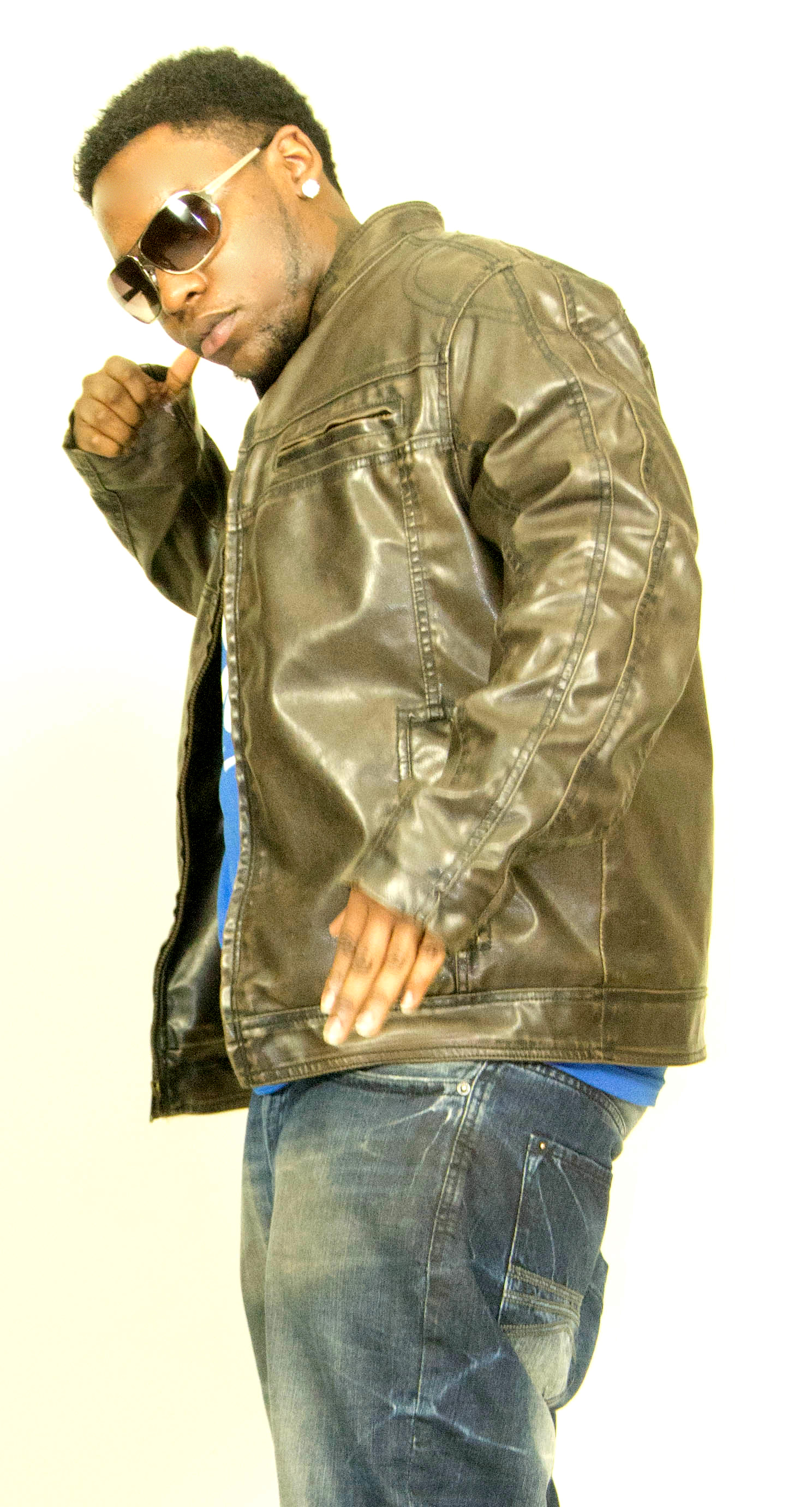
- Cordaro Stewart, 2011

Background information
- Also known as: C. Stewart, Mr. Ca$h King
- Born: September 18, 1990 (age 36); Detroit, Michigan
- Genre: Hip hop
- Occupation: Rapper
- Instrument: Vocals
- Years active: 2005–present
- Website: www.cordaro.org

Cordaro Uveil Stewart (born September 18, 1990) better known by his stage names Mr. Cash King and C. Stewart, is an American Rapper from Detroit, Michigan. On December 10, 2015 he released his first independent recording Single (music), "Inspiration" it was one of the top 11 songs and first in the rap Music genre at the fourth annual GRAMMY Amplifier program with Big Sean, Sam Hunt, and Lzzy Hale being the curator judges. His second single, "Round Hea" Featuring Atlantic Records recording artist Dusty McFly was released in 2016 as a trap heavy song.

== Discography ==
=== Singles ===
| Year | Title | Peak chart positions | | | | | | | Certifications (sales thresholds) | Album |
| Year | Title | UK | AUS | IRL | FIN | GER | NOR | US | Certifications (sales thresholds) | Album |
|---|---|---|---|---|---|---|---|---|---|---|
| 2015 | "Inspiration" | — | — | — | — | — | — | — | | Non-album singles |
| 2016 | "Round Hea Feat. Dusty McFly" | — | — | — | — | — | — | — | | Non-album singles |
| 2016 | "Money Man" | — | — | — | — | — | — | — | | Hustle Motivation Music |
"—" denotes a recording that did not chart or was not released in that territory.
