= George Darany =

American politician (born 1956)

George T. Darany

Member of the Michigan House of Representatives from the 15th district
- In office January 1, 2011 – December 31, 2016
- Preceded by: Gino H. Polidori
- Succeeded by: Abdullah Hammoud

Personal details
- Born: March 12, 1956 (age 70) Detroit, Michigan, United States
- Party: Democratic
- Spouse: Maria Marzolo
- Education: University of Michigan-Dearborn
- Occupation: City Clerk
- Profession: Elected Official
- Website: State Rep. George Darany

George T. Darany (born March 12, 1956) is a retired Democratic politician from Michigan, who served in the Michigan House of Representatives from 2011 to 2017.

Darany is currently the City Clerk in the City of Dearborn, Michigan, is a former member of Dearborn City Council, was the founder and owner of a small business, Classic Trolley Company from 1986 to 2006, and has worked as a realtor and associate broker for RE/MAX TEam 2000 in Dearborn for 25 years.

Darany married Maria Marzolo, owner of Liberta Cleaning Team, on November 10, 2018.

Darany is of Syrian descent and is Catholic.
