= John B. O'Reilly Jr. =

American politician (1948–2025)

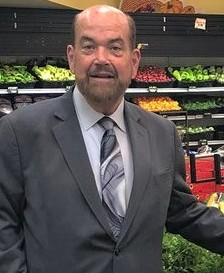
- O'Reilly in 2018

6th Mayor of Dearborn
- In office February 27, 2007 – January 1, 2022
- Preceded by: Michael Guido
- Succeeded by: Abdullah Hammoud

Personal details
- Born: September 21, 1948 Detroit, Michigan, U.S.
- Died: January 1, 2025 (aged 76) Dearborn, Michigan, U.S.
- Party: Democratic
- Spouse: Christina O'Reilly (m. 1973)
- Children: 3

John Bernard "Jack" O'Reilly Jr. (September 21, 1948 – January 1, 2025) was an American politician who served as the 6th mayor of Dearborn, Michigan, from 2007 to 2022. A member of the Democratic Party, he previously served on the Dearborn City Council from 1990 to 2007.

== Career ==
=== Dearborn City Council ===
O'Reilly began his political career serving as Washington staff counsel and district director for then-U.S. Congressman John D. Dingell, before serving as chief of staff in the Michigan State Senate. He was elected as a city councilman for Dearborn for 17 years between 1990 and 2007.

=== Mayor of Dearborn ===
Following the death of mayor Michael Guido from cancer, O'Reilly was appointed the interim mayor until a special election could be held. He proceeded to run as a candidate during the special election and won and would be sworn in as a full mayor on February 27, 2007. As mayor he improved the city's public infrastructure, overseeing the construction of the John D. Dingell Transit Center, in an effort to turn the city into a regional transportation hub. As mayor he also streamlined the bureaucratic process in the city, cutting out red tape.

O'Reilly also promoted economic development and community programs, most notably with Ford Land, where he worked with Ford Land’s Wagner Place development, which remade part of Dearborn’s west downtown area. O'Reilly was elected president of the Michigan Municipal League from 2015 – 2016 where he received the 2022 Honorary Life Membership Award for the most active and inspiring leaders dedicated to the League and its mission. He was also active with the Urban Core Mayors, Downriver Community Conference, Conference of Western Wayne, United States Conference of Mayors, and the Southeast Michigan Council of Governments while maintaining a role with the Urban Core Mayors, a bipartisan, multi-regional coalition of 13 central city mayors.

In January 2019, Dearborn Historian editor Bill McGraw had his contract terminated for an Autumn 2018 issue concerning Henry Ford. That issue, concurrent with the 100th anniversary of Ford's acquisition of the Dearborn Independent newspaper, detailed the anti-Semitic influence that Ford infamously exerted. The city government's suppression of the issue received widespread exposure, with some calling for Dearborn officials and others related to Ford's industry to recognize the impact of Ford's antisemitism.

At a municipal deposition on February 13, 2019, Mayor O'Reilly was unable to answer basic personal questions, forgetting how many children he had, their names and ages, as well as stating he took his bar exam in 1890. However, despite this he continued to serve as mayor for an additional two years until in another deposition on June 26, 2021, where he was too mentally unfit to even appear, instead having to issue all his statements through curated press releases. He would announce on July 9, 2021 that has been suffering from an undisclosed illness preventing him from making public appearances and that he would not be seeking another term as mayor, retiring after 32 years of public service.

== Personal life and death ==
O'Reilly was married and had three sons. His father, John B. O'Reilly Sr., was mayor from 1978 to 1985 and also Dearborn's police chief. O'Reilly died on January 1, 2025, at the age of 76. His son, Devon O’Reilly, said that he died of natural causes listening to his favorite music and poems while surrounded by family.
