= Gary Woronchak =

American politician from Michigan

Member of the Wayne County Commission from the 13th district
- In office January 1, 2005 – December 31, 2018
- Succeeded by: Sam Baydoun

Member of the Michigan House of Representatives from the 15th district
- In office January 1, 1999 – December 31, 2004
- Preceded by: Agnes Dobronski
- Succeeded by: Gino Polidori

Personal details
- Party: Republican 1999-2005 Democrat 2005-
- Education: University of Michigan–Dearborn

Gary Woronchak is an American politician and newspaper editor.

Born in Detroit, Michigan, Woronchak graduated from University of Michigan–Dearborn and was the editor for the Dearborn Press & Guide and managing editor of the Daily Tribune in Royal Oak, Michigan. He served in the Michigan House of Representatives from 1999 to 2004 and lived in Dearborn, Michigan. Woronchak then served on the Wayne County, Michigan Board of Commissioners, starting in January 2005 until December 2018. He was Chairman of the Commission from 2011–2018.
