= 1993 in Michigan =

- Decades: 1970s; 1980s; 1990s; 2000s; 2010s
- See also: History of Michigan; Historical outline of Michigan; List of years in Michigan; 1993 in the United States

This article reviews 1993 in Michigan, including the state's office holders, demographics, performance of sports teams, cultural events, a chronology of the state's top news and sports stories, and notable Michigan-related births and deaths.

== Top Michigan news stories ==
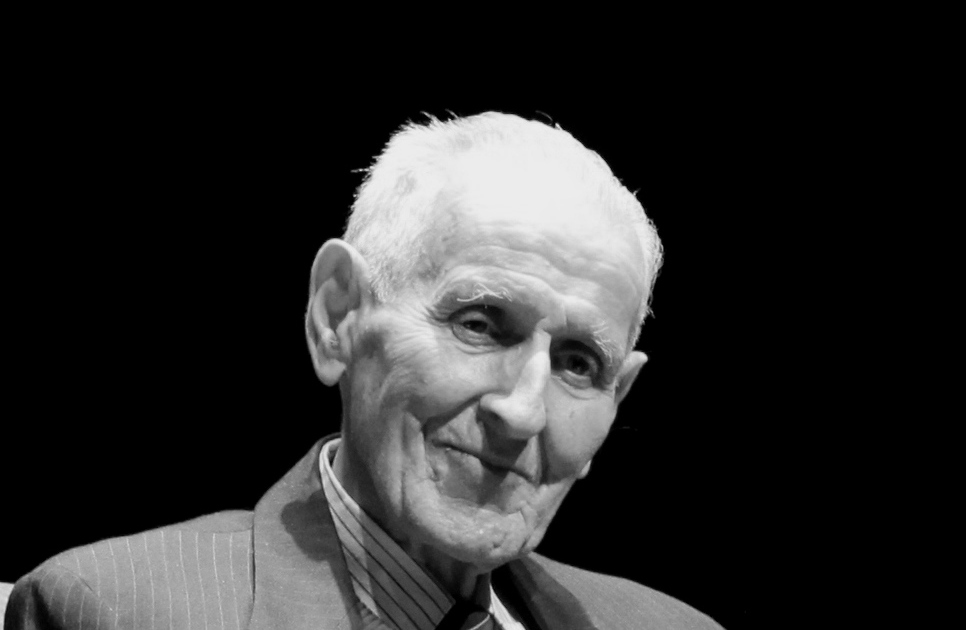
Jack Kevorkian

Broadcast and newspaper members of the Associated Press voted on the top news stories in Michigan for 1993 as follows:

1. School finance. After the Kalkaska school system was forced to close 40 days early, Governor Engler and the Michigan Legislature put Proposal A (a school finance and property cut proposal) on the June 2 ballot. After Proposal A was defeated, Governor Engler and the Legislature ended the use of property taxes to fund schools.
2. Jack Kevorkian. After Kevorkian attended three assisted suicides in one month, the Legislature adopted an immediate ban on assisted suicide. Kevorkian attended five suicides after the ban, was jailed, and staged two hunger strikes, the second one lasting 17 days. Two courts then ruled the suicide ban to be unconstitutional.
3. Baby Jessica case. Jan and Roberta DeBoer took their custody fight for their two-and-a-half year old daughter to the U.S. Supreme Court. Jessica was ultimately returned to her biological parents in Iowa.
4. Malice Green murder case. Two Detroit police officers were tried and convicted the December 1992 beating death of Malice Green.
5. Coleman Young. Young announced his retirement after 20 years as Mayor of Detroit. Dennis Archer was elected to replace him.
6. Donald Riegle. Riegle announced that he would retire at the end of his term in the U.S. Senate.
7. Base closings. Wurtsmith Air Force Base was decommissioned after 70 years, but several companies announce plans to open operations on the site. Plans were also finalized to close K. I. Sawyer Air Force Base.
8. House Fiscal Agency. Michigan and federal officials investigated $1.8 million in alleged misspending by the agency, including thousands spent on bonuses from a petty cash account.
9. NAFTA. Michigan Congressman and House Majority Whip David Bonior led an effort to defeat NAFTA. Michigan's 10 House Democrats and both U.S. Senators (both Democrats) voted against NAFTA. The state's five House Republicans voted for NAFTA.
10. Recovery of U.S. automobile industry.

In separate balloting by Michigan AP newspapers and broadcast stations, the state's top sports stories were selected as follows:

1. Fab Five in Final Four. Chris Webber's illegal timeout at the end of the championship game in the 1993 NCAA basketball tournament.
2. Dennis Rodman traded by the Pistons.
3. Chris Webber turned pro.
4. Bill Laimbeer retired.
5. Cecil Fielder signed the richest contract in Major League Baseball history: five years for $36 million.
6. 1993 Rose Bowl. Michigan defeated Washington as Tyrone Wheatley rushed for 235 yards and three touchdowns.
7. The Detroit Red Wings hired Scotty Bowman as coach.
8. After the 1992-93 Detroit Pistons failed to qualify for the playoffs, head coach Ron Rothstein was fired.
9. 1993 Detroit Tigers season. The team was in first place in late June, but fell to third place by the end of the season.
10. Brothers Luke and Murphy Jensen from Ludington, Michigan, won the doubles championship at the 1993 French Open.

== Office holders ==
=== State office holders ===
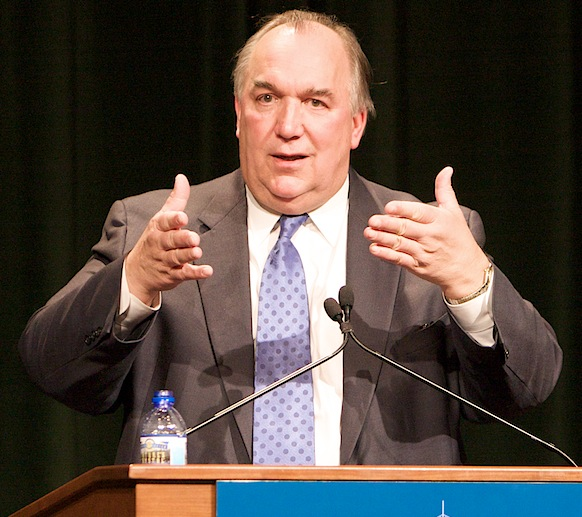
Gov. Engler

- Governor of Michigan: John Engler (Republican)
- Lieutenant Governor of Michigan: Connie Binsfeld (Republican)
- Michigan Attorney General: Frank J. Kelley (Democrat)
- Michigan Secretary of State: Richard H. Austin (Democrat)
- Speaker of the Michigan House of Representatives: Paul Hillegonds (Republican)
- Majority Leader of the Michigan Senate: Dick Posthumus (Republican)
- Chief Justice, Michigan Supreme Court: Michael Cavanagh

=== Mayors of major cities ===
- Mayor of Detroit: Coleman Young
- Mayor of Grand Rapids: Gerald R. Helmholdt
- Mayor of Warren, Michigan: Ronald L. Bonkowski
- Mayor of Sterling Heights, Michigan: Stephen M. Rice
- Mayor of Flint: Woodrow Stanley
- Mayor of Dearborn: Michael Guido
- Mayor of Lansing: Jim Crawford/David Hollister
- Mayor of Ann Arbor: Elizabeth Brater/Ingrid Sheldon
- Mayor of Saginaw: Henry H. Nickleberry/Gary L. Loster

=== Federal office holders ===
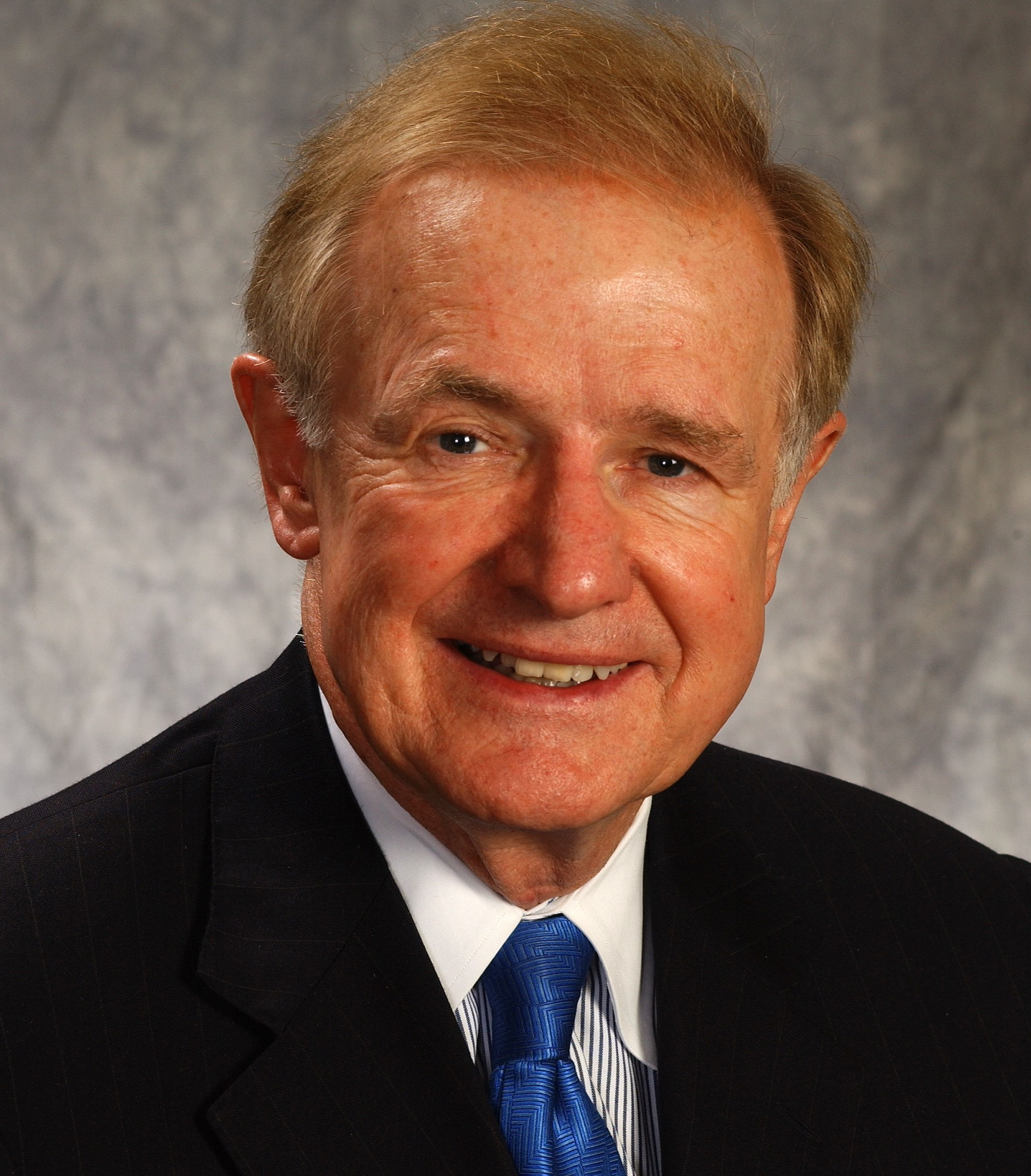
Sen. Riegle

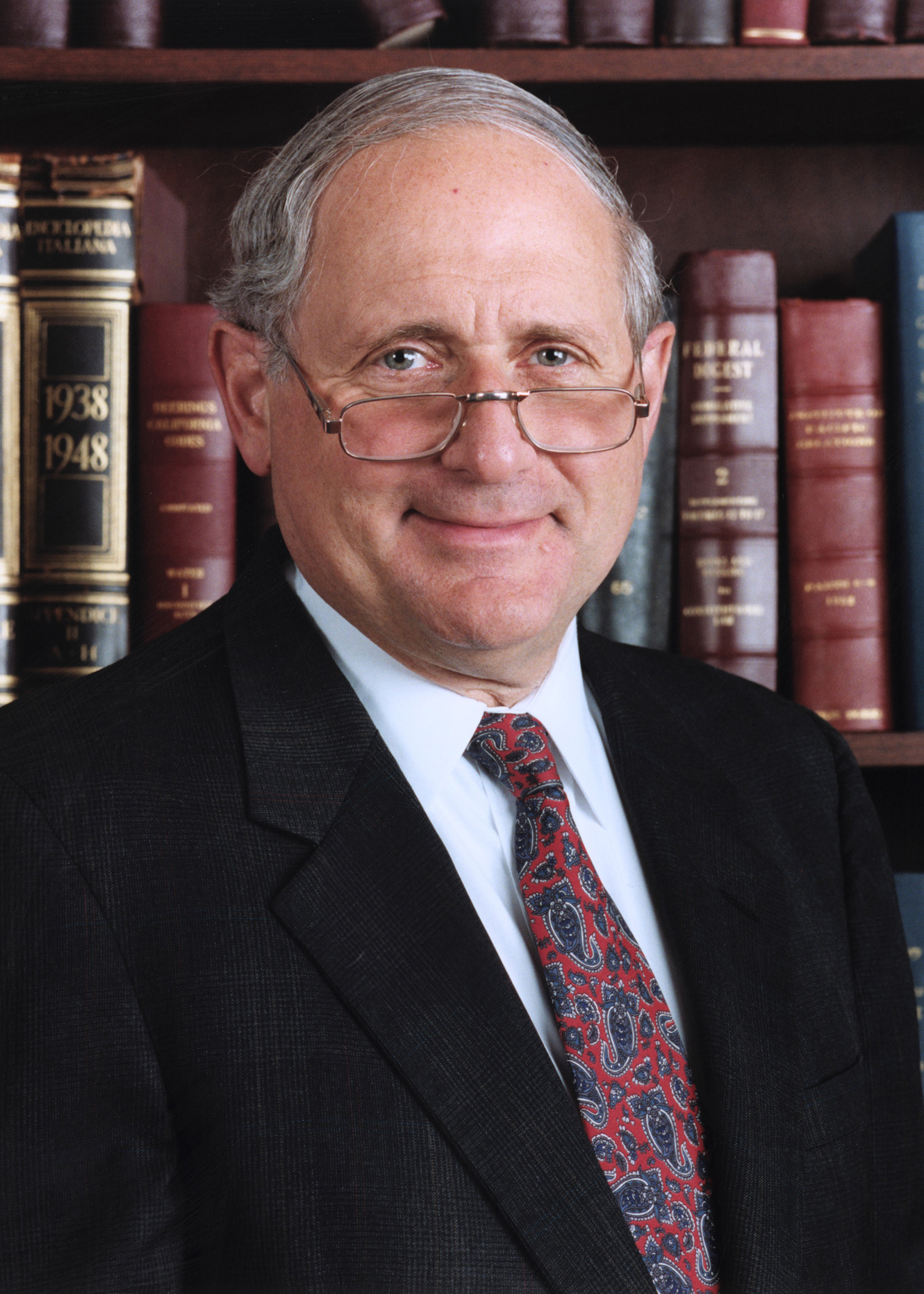
Sen. Levin

- U.S. Senator from Michigan: Donald Riegle (Democrat)
- U.S. Senator from Michigan: Carl Levin (Democrat)
- House District 1: Bart Stupak (Democrat)
- House District 2: Pete Hoekstra (Republican)
- House District 3: Paul B. Henry (Republican)/Vern Ehlers (Republican)
- House District 4: Dave Camp (Republican)
- House District 5: James A. Barcia (Democrat)
- House District 6: Fred Upton (Republican)
- House District 7: Nick Smith (Republican)
- House District 8: Milton Robert Carr (Democrat)
- House District 9: Dale Kildee (Democrat)
- House District 10: David Bonior (Democrat)
- House District 11: Joe Knollenberg (Republican)
- House District 12: Sander Levin (Democrat)
- House District 13: William D. Ford (Democrat)
- House District 14: John Conyers (Democrat)
- House District 15: Barbara-Rose Collins (Democrat)
- House District 16: John Dingell (Democrat)

== Population ==
In the 1990 United States census, Michigan was recorded as having a population of 9,295,29 persons, ranking as the eighth most populous state in the country. By 2000, the state's population had grown by 6.9% to 9,938,444 persons.

=== Cities ===
The following is a list of cities in Michigan with a population of at least 50,000 based on 1990 U.S. Census data. Historic census data from 1980 and 2000 is included to reflect trends in population increases or decreases. Cities that are part of the Detroit metropolitan area are shaded in tan.

1990 Rank	City	County	1980 Pop.	1990 Pop.	2000 Pop.	Change 1990-2000
1	Detroit	Wayne	1,203,368	1,027,974	951,270	−7.5% ▼
2	Grand Rapids	Kent	181,843	189,126	197,800	4.6% ▲
3	Warren	Macomb	161,134	144,864	138,247	−4.6% ▼
4	Flint	Genesee	159,611	140,761	124,943	−11.2% ▼
5	Lansing	Ingham	130,414	127,321	119,128	−6.4% ▼
6	Sterling Heights	Macomb	108,999	117,810	124,471	5.7% ▲
7	Ann Arbor	Washtenaw	107,969	109,592	114,024	4.0% ▲
8	Livonia	Wayne	104,814	100,850	100,545	−0.3% ▼
9	Dearborn	Wayne	90,660	89,286	97,775	9.5%▼
10	Westland	Wayne	84,603	84,724	86,602	2.2% ▲
11	Kalamazoo	Kalamazoo	79,722	80,277	76,145	−5.1% ▼
12	Southfield	Oakland	75,608	75,745	78,322	3.4% ▲
13	Farmington Hills	Oakland	58,056	74,611	82,111	10.1% ▲
14	Troy	Oakland	67,102	72,884	80,959	11.1% ▲
15	Pontiac	Oakland	76,715	71,166	66,337	−6.8% ▼
16	Taylor	Wayne	77,568	70,811	65,868	−7.0% ▼
17	Saginaw	Saginaw	77,508	69,512	61,799	−11.1% ▼
18	St. Clair Shores	Macomb	76,210	68,107	63,096	−7.4% ▼
19	Royal Oak	Oakland	70,893	65,410	60,062	−8.2% ▼
20	Wyoming	Kent	59,616	63,891	69,368	8.6% ▲
21	Dearborn Heights	Wayne	67,706	60,838	58,264	−4.2% ▼
22	Roseville	Wayne	54,311	51,412	48,129	−6.4% ▼
23	East Lansing	Ingham	51,392	50,677	46,525	−8.2% ▼

=== Counties ===
The following is a list of counties in Michigan with populations of at least 150,000 based on 1990 U.S. Census data. Historic census data from 1980 and 2000 are included to reflect trends in population increases or decreases. Counties that are part of the Detroit metropolitan area are shaded in tan.

1990 Rank	County	Largest city	1980 Pop.	1990 Pop.	2000 Pop.	Change 1900-2000
1	Wayne	Detroit	2,337,891	2,111,687	2,061,162	−2.4% ▼
2	Oakland	Pontiac	1,011,793	1,083,592	1,194,156	10.2% ▲
3	Macomb	Warren	694,600	717,400	788,149	9.9% ▲
4	Kent	Grand Rapids	444,506	500,631	574,335	14.7% ▲
5	Genesee	Flint	450,449	430,459	436,141	1.3% ▼
6	Washtenaw	Ann Arbor	264,748	282,937	322,895	14.1% ▲
7	Ingham	Lansing	275,520	281,912	279,320	−0.9% ▼
8	Kalamazoo	Kalamazoo	212,378	223,411	238,603	6.8% ▲
9	Saginaw	Saginaw	228,059	211,946	210,039	−0.9% ▼
10	Ottawa	Holland	157,174	187,768	238,314	26.9% ▲
11	Berrien	Benton Harbor	171,276	161,378	162,453	0.6% ▲
12	Muskegon	Muskegon	157,589	158,983	170,200	7.1% ▲
13	Jackson	Jackson	151,495	149,756	158,422	5.8% ▼

== Sports ==
=== Baseball ===
- 1993 Detroit Tigers season – Under manager Sparky Anderson, the Tigers compiled an 85–77 record and tied for third in American League East. The team's statistical leaders included Alan Trammell with a .329 batting average, Mickey Tettleton with 32 home runs, Cecil Fielder with 117 RBIs, John Doherty with 14 wins, and Mike Henneman with a 2.64 earned run average.

=== American football ===
- 1993 Detroit Lions season – Under head coach Wayne Fontes, the Lions compiled a 10–5 record and finished first in the NFC Central Division. The team's statistical leaders included Rodney Peete with 1,670 passing yards, Barry Sanders with 1,115 rushing yards and 130 points scored, and Herman Moore with 935 receiving yards.
- 1993 Michigan Wolverines football team – Under head coach Gary Moeller, the Wolverines compiled an 8–4 record, tied for fourth in the Big Ten Conference, defeated NC State in the 1993 Hall of Fame Bowl, and were ranked No. 21 in the final AP poll. The team's statistical leaders included Todd Collins with 2,509 passing yards, Tyrone Wheatley with 1,129 rushing yards and 84 points scored, Derrick Alexander with 621 receiving yards.
- 1993 Michigan State Spartans football team – Under head coach George Perles, the Spartans compiled a 6–6 record and lost to Louisville in the 1993 Liberty Bowl. The team's statistical leaders included Jim Miller with 2,269 passing yards, Duane Goulbourne with 973 rushing yards, Mill Coleman with 671 receiving yards, and Bill Stoyanovich with 65 points scored.

=== Basketball ===
- 1992–93 Detroit Pistons season – Under head coach Ron Rothstein, the Pistons compiled a 40–42 record and finished sixth in the NBA's Central Division. The team's statistical leaders included Joe Dumars with 1,809 points, Isaiah Thomas with 671 assists and Dennis Rodman with 1,132 rebounds.

=== Ice hockey ===
- 1992–93 Detroit Red Wings season – Under head coach Bryan Murray, the Red Wings compiled a 47–28–9 record and finished second in the NHL Norris Division. Steve Yzerman led the team with 58 goals, 79 assists, and 137 points. The team's goaltenders included Tim Cheveldae (67 games) and Vincent Riendeau (22 games).

== Births ==
- January 25 - Imashiine record producer, in Detroit
- February 8 - Dennis Norfleet, wide receiver/running back
- March 3 - Morgen Baird, stock car racing driver, in Grass Lake
- March 12 - Gmac Cash, comedy rapper, in Detroit
- March 26 - Charlotte Lichtman, ice dancer, in Detroit
- May 13 - Cyn, singer and songwriter, in Michigan
- May 25 - Asa Kryst, soccer player, in Jackson
- June 5 - Breonna Taylor, African-American woman who was shot and killed while unarmed in her Louisville, in Grand Rapids
- June 15 - Shannon Osika, middle-distance runner, in Waterford
- June 18 - Zelooperz, rappers and songwriter, in Detroit
- July 11 - Rebecca Bross, gymnast, in Ann Arbor
- July 23 - Bryn Forbes, basketball player, in Lansing
- July 26 - Caleb Stanko, soccer player, in Holly
- August 3 - Thomas Rawls, running back for Michigan, Central Michigan and Seattle Seahawks, in Flint, Michigan
- August 5 - Matt Costello, basketball player, in Lindwood
- September 14 - Stephanie Lee, actress-model, in Grand Rapids
- October 21 - Jermaine Franklin, boxer, in Saginaw
- October 21 - Fatai Alashe, soccer player, in Southfield
- November 1 - Crystal Bradford, basketball player, in Detroit
- November 16 - Denzel Washington, basketball player, in Lansing
- November 21 - Cooper Rush, quarterback, in Charlotte
- November 23 - Riley Bullough, linebacker, in Traverse City
- November 28 - Shiann Darkangelo, hockey player, in Royal Oak
- December 25 - Emily Ehrlich, cyclist, in Deaborn
- 1993 - Drake Carr, artist, in Flint

=== Gallery of 1993 births ===
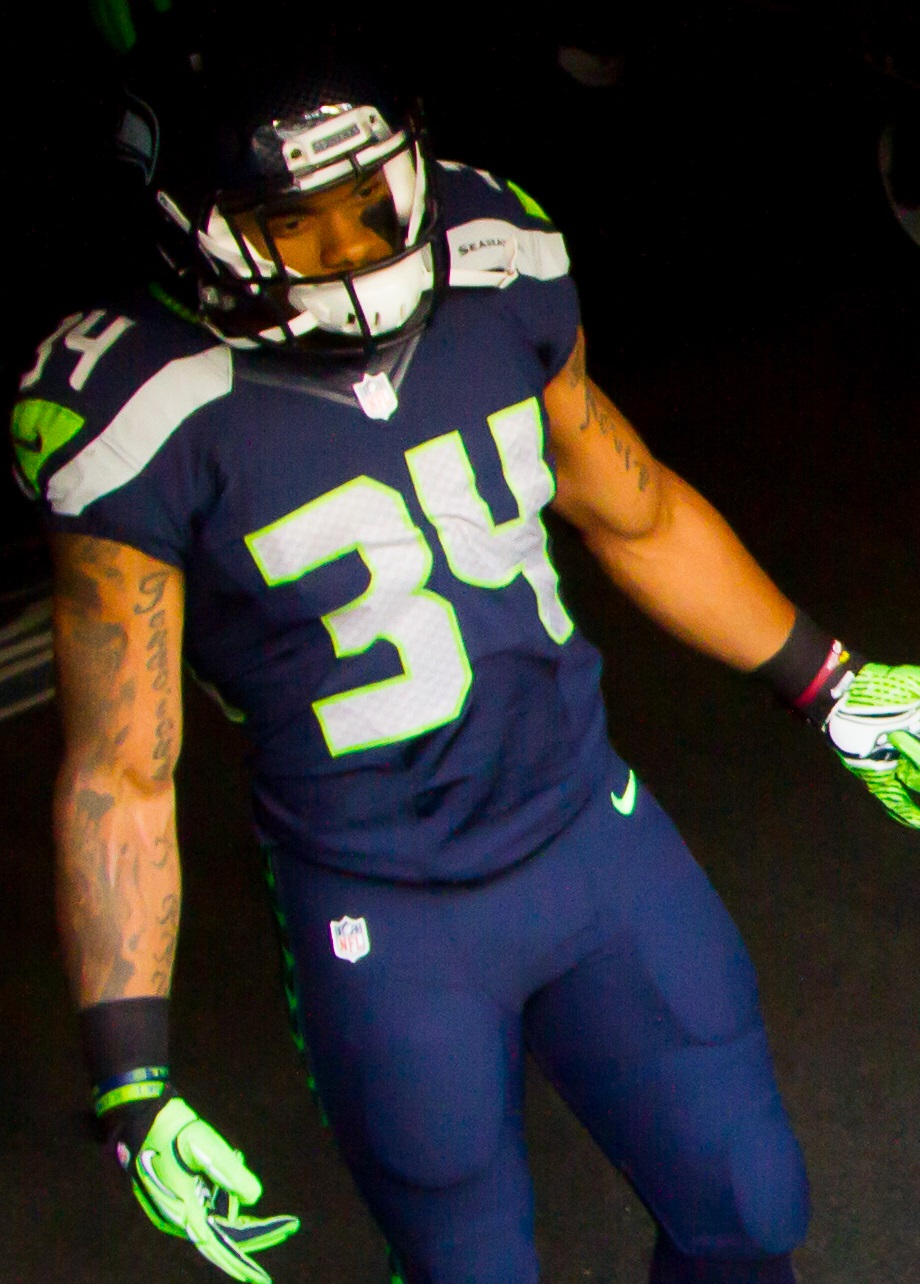
Thomas Rawls

== Deaths ==
- January 21 - Charlie Gehringer, Detroit Tigers second baseman (1924–1942) and Baseball Hall of Fame inductee, at age 89 in Bloomfield Hills
- February 15 - Buzz Fazio, professional bowling star and member of the Stroh's Beer bowling team in the 1950s, at age 85
- February 25 - Eren Ozker, one of the original Muppeteers who grew up in Farmington Hills, at age 44 in New York City
- March 23 - Zolton Ferency, lawyer, political activist, professor, and gubernatorial candidate, at age 70
- May 15 - Marv Johnson, early Motown singer ("You Got What It Takes"), at age 54 in Columbia, South Carolina
- July 4 - Don Dohoney, American football end at Michigan State and consensus All-American in 1953, at age 61 in Meridian, Michigan
- July 31 - Paul B. Henry, U.S. Congressman, at age 51 in Grand Rapids
- October 24 - Cloyce Box, Detroit Lions end/halfback (1949–1954) who broke multiple team receiving records, at age 70 in Frisco, Texas
- November 4 - Doris Satterfield, outfielder for the Grand Rapids Chicks (1947–1954) in the All-American Girls Professional Baseball League, at age 67 in Grand Rapids
- Date unknown - Edie Parker, writer and wife of Jack Kerouac

=== Gallery of 1993 deaths ===
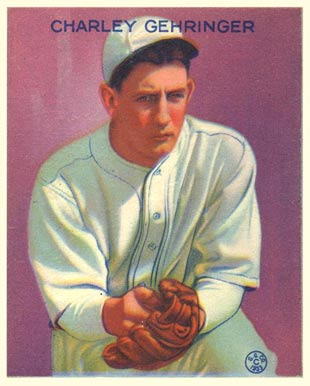
Charlie Gehringer

== See also ==
- History of Michigan
- History of Detroit
