= 1996 in Michigan =

- Decades: 1970s; 1980s; 1990s; 2000s; 2010s
- See also: History of Michigan; Historical outline of Michigan; List of years in Michigan; 1996 in the United States

This article reviews 1996 in Michigan, including the state's office holders, performance of sports teams, a chronology of the state's top news and sports stories, and notable Michigan-related births and deaths.

== Top Michigan news stories ==
- Voters autorize casino gambling - On November 5, Michigan voters narrowly passed Proposal E, enacting the Michigan Gaming Control and Revenue Act and allowing the establishment of three casinos in Detroit. The proposal passed with 1,878,542 votes, 51.51% of the total.
- Democratic victories in November elections - In the November 5 elections, Michigan voters chose Bill Clinton for President (51.69%) over Bob Dole (38.48%) and Ross Perot (8.75%). They also reelected Carl Levin with 58.36% of the votes over Ronna Romney (39.88%).
- Detroit newspaper strike of 1995–1997

== Office holders ==
=== State office holders ===
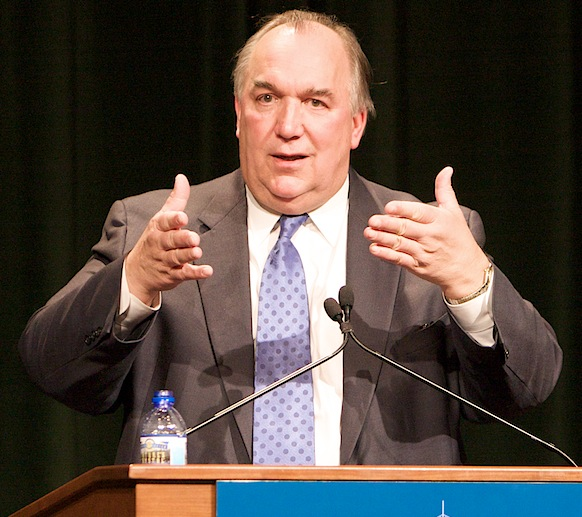
Gov. Engler

- Governor of Michigan: John Engler (Republican)
- Lieutenant Governor of Michigan: Connie Binsfeld (Republican)
- Michigan Attorney General: Frank J. Kelley (Democrat)
- Michigan Secretary of State: Candice Miller (Republican)
- Speaker of the Michigan House of Representatives: Paul Hillegonds (Republican)
- Majority Leader of the Michigan Senate: Dick Posthumus (Republican)
- Chief Justice, Michigan Supreme Court: James H. Brickley

=== Mayors of major cities ===
- Mayor of Detroit: Dennis Archer
- Mayor of Grand Rapids: John H. Logie
- Mayor of Warren, Michigan: Ronald L. Bonkowski/Mark Steenbergh
- Mayor of Flint: Woodrow Stanley
- Mayor of Dearborn: Michael Guido
- Mayor of Lansing: David Hollister
- Mayor of Ann Arbor: Ingrid Sheldon
- Mayor of Saginaw: Gary L. Loster

=== Federal office holders ===
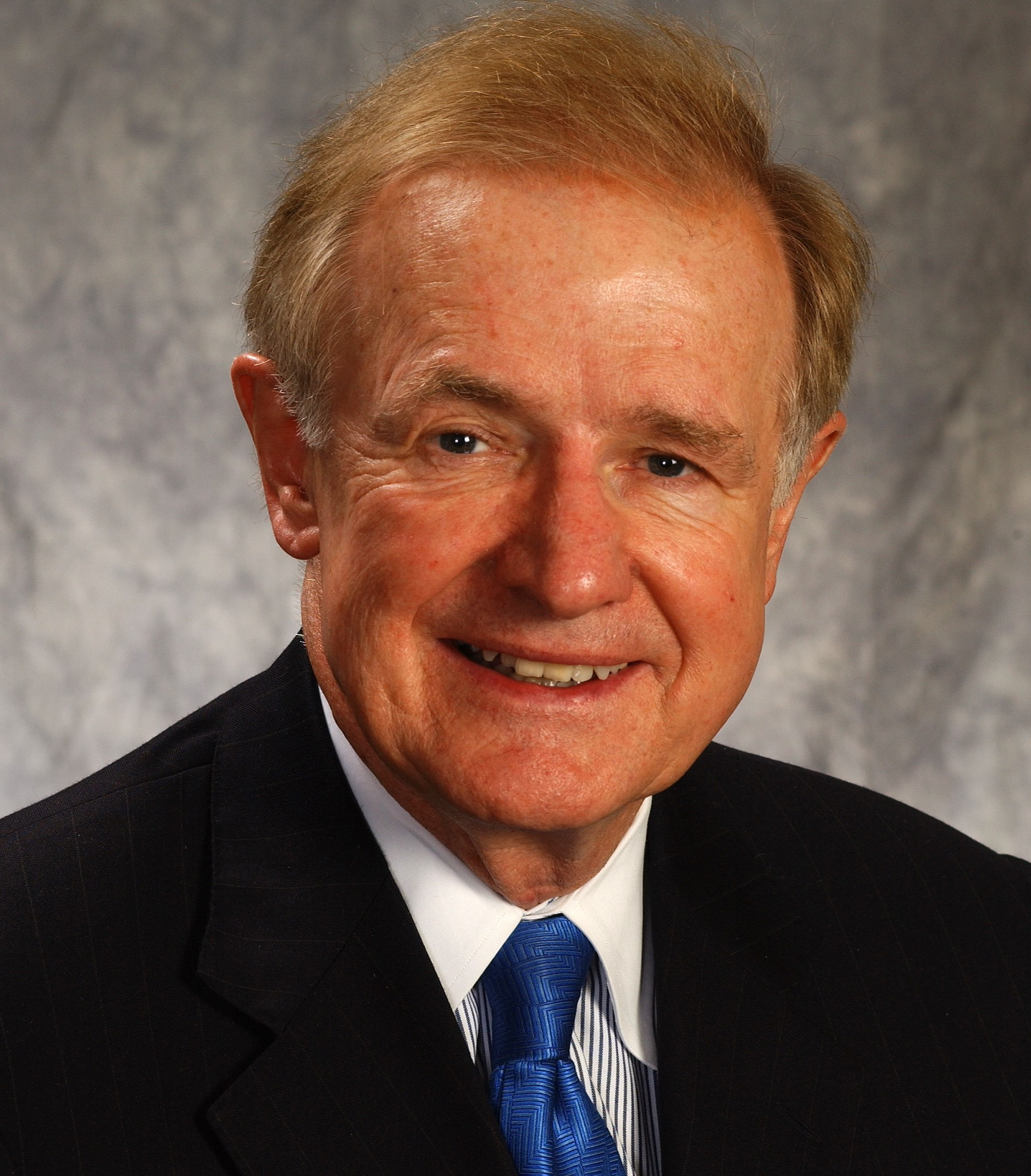
Sen. Riegle

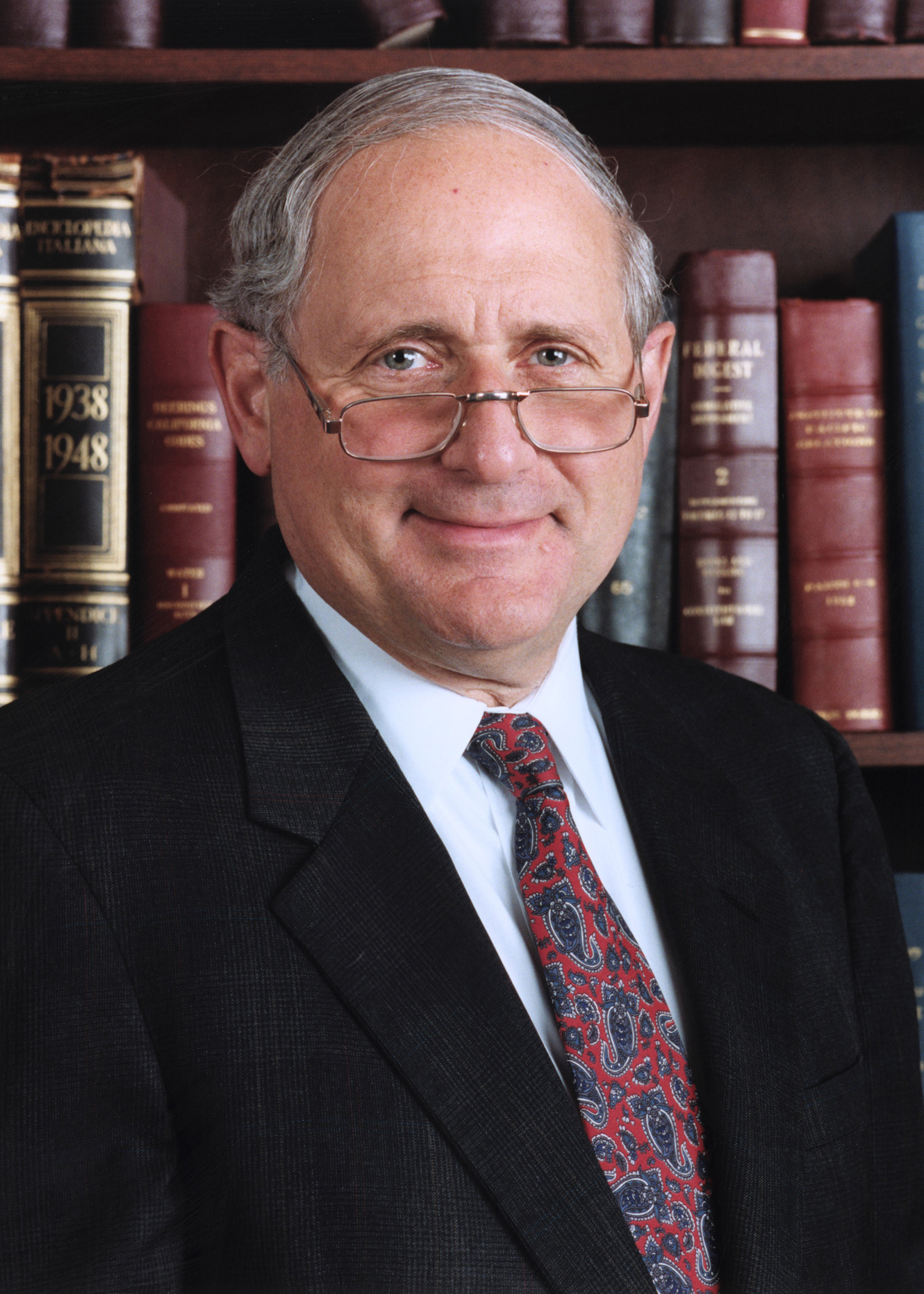
Sen. Levin

- U.S. Senator from Michigan: Spencer Abraham (Republican)
- U.S. Senator from Michigan: Carl Levin (Democrat)
- House District 1: Bart Stupak (Democrat)
- House District 2: Pete Hoekstra (Republican)
- House District 3: Vern Ehlers (Republican)
- House District 4: Dave Camp (Republican)
- House District 5: James A. Barcia (Democrat)
- House District 6: Fred Upton (Republican)
- House District 7: Nick Smith (Republican)
- House District 8: Milton Robert Carr (Democrat)
- House District 9: Dale Kildee (Democrat)
- House District 10: David Bonior (Democrat)
- House District 11: Joe Knollenberg (Republican)
- House District 12: Sander Levin (Democrat)
- House District 13: Lynn Rivers (Democrat)
- House District 14: John Conyers (Democrat)
- House District 15: Barbara-Rose Collins (Democrat)
- House District 16: John Dingell (Democrat)

== Sports ==
=== Baseball ===
- 1996 Detroit Tigers season – In their first season under manager Buddy Bell, the Tigers compiled a 53–109 record. The team's statistical leaders included Tony Clark (27 home runs), Travis Fryman (100 RBIs), Bobby Higginson (.320 batting average), and Omar Olivares (7 wins, 113 strikeouts)

=== American football ===
- 1996 Detroit Lions season – In their 12th year under head coach Wayne Fontes, the Lions compiled a 5–11 record. The team's statistical leaders included Scott Mitchell (2,917 passing yards), Barry Sanders (1,553 rushing yards), and Herman Moore (1,296 receiving yards).
- 1996 Michigan Wolverines football team – In their secon season under head coach Lloyd Carr, the Wolverines compiled an 8–4 record, losing to Alabama in the Outback Bowl. The team's statistical leaders include Scott Dreisbach (2,025 passing yards), Clarence Williams (779 rushing yards), and Tai Streets (718 receiving yards).
- 1996 Michigan State Spartans football team – In their second season under head coach Nick Saban, the Spartans compiled a 6–6 record, including a loss to Stanford in the Sun Bowl. The team's statistical leaders included Todd Schultz (1,625 passing yards), Sedrick Irvin (1,036 rushing yards), and Derrick Mason (822 receiving yards).

=== Basketball ===
- 1995–96 Detroit Pistons season – In their third year under head coach Don Chaney, the Pistons compiled a 46–36 record. Grant Hill led the team with 1,618 points, 783 rebounds, and 548 assists.

=== Ice hockey ===
- 1995–96 Detroit Red Wings season – Under head coach Scotty Bowman, the Red Wings compiled a 62–13–7 record and lost in the Western Conference finals to the Colorado Avalanche. Sergei Federov led the team with 39 goals, 68 assists, and 107 points.

=== Other ===
- 1996 ITT Automotive Grand Prix of Detroit

== Chronology of events ==
=== January ===
- January 31 - Four workers were killed while working below ground in a metering pit when a water main bust in Macomb Township.

=== February ===
- February 17 - The Detroit Pistons retired Isiah Thomas' jersey number in a ceremony at the Palace.
- February 20 - The trial of Jack Kevorkian for assisting a suicide began in Pontiace. He was acquitted.

=== April ===
- April 3 - Jackson Field opened in downtown Lansing with a baseball game between Michigan and Michigan State. It has served as the home of the Lansing Lugnuts baseball team since 1996
- April 22 - Luciano Pavarotti performed at the opening of the Detroit Opera House.

=== May ===
- May 16 - Murder of Debbie Iverson: Iverson, a 38-year old Bloomfield Hills ophthalmologist with two young children, was found strangled to death in her Toyota Land Cruiser. On December 31, a 21-year-old couple from Clawson, McConnell Adams Jr. and Anitra Coomer, confessed to the crime, saying she was a random robbery target as she got into her vehicle in Birmingham. The pair was found guilty after a trial in October 1997.
- May 29 - The Detroit Red Wings were eliminated in the Western Conference finals, losing to the Colorado Avalance in the sixth game by a 4-1 score.

=== August ===
- August 20 - Detroit mayor Dennis Archer, Mike Ilitch, and William Clay Ford Jr. announced plans for new stadiums in downtown Detroit that would serve as the home for both the Detroit Lions and Detroit Tigers.

=== September ===
- September 29 - Alan Trammell retired after 20 years with the Detroit Tigers.

=== October ===
- October 2 - William T. Cunningham, founder of Focus: HOPE announced that he had cancer. He died in May 1997.
- October 8 - Van Andel Arena opened in Grand Rapids
- October 9 - Brendan Shanahan joined the Detroit Red Wings

=== November ===
- November 4 - Kalamazoo native Derek Jeter was selected as Major League Baseball's Rookie of the Year.
- November 5 - Elections in Michigan

- 1996 United States presidential election in Michigan: Democrat Bill Clinton won in Michigan with 1,989,653 botes (51.69$%), defeating Republican Bob Dole (38.48%) and Reform Party candidate Ross Perot (8.75%).
- 1996 United States Senate election in Michigan: Carl Levin was reelected with 2,196,738 votes (58.36%), defeating Ronna Romney who garnered 1,500,106 votes (39.88%).
- Proposal E - was passed in close voting with 1,878,542 votes (51.51%), enacting the Michigan Gaming Control and Revenue Act to allow casino gambling in Detroit. The proposal passed by wide margins in Detroit (82%) and the Detroit area (59%) but registered only 49% in outstate areas.
- Proposal S - Stadium tax increases to build two new stadiums east of Woodward Avenue near the Fox Theatre was approved by a wide margin. Mike Duggan, deputy county executive and an architect of the stadium plan, said: "This is a great night for Detroit and all of Wayne County. Twenty years from now, when people come downtown to the dome and the casinos they will look back on Nov. 5, 1996, as the turning point in Detroit's comeback."

- November 12 - Janathan Schmitz was found guilty by an Oakland County jury of the murder of Scott Amedure. The two had taped The Jenny Jones Show three days before the murder in a secred admirer segment in which Amedure revealed his crush on Schmitz. He was sentenced to 25-50 years in prison. Schmitz was released from prison in 2017.
- November 14 - Wixom Assembly Plant shooting: Gerald Atkins, a 29-year-old Army veteran, walked into the plant in Wixom and began shooting out windows, then opening fire in the cafeteria and other areas. A plant official, Darrell Izzard, age 57, was killed, and three others were wounded. He then left the plant and began shooting a cars on the adjacent I-96 freeway, injuring two deputies. He then hid out for three hours in culverts and tunnels below the plant before surrendering to police. The rampage began after Atkins was denied entry to the plant so propose to a woman named Debbie with whom he was enfatuated.
- November 23 - No. 21 Michigan defeated No. 2 Ohio State, 13-9, at Columbus, despite being a 17-point underdog.

=== December ===
- December 11 - A growing Muslim group in Dearborn, the Islamic House of Wisdom, announced plans to build a 35,000-square-foot mega-mosque.
- December 13 - Denny McLain, who won 30 games for the Detroit Tigers in 1968, was found guilty by a federal jury in Detroit on five federal charges related to theft from the pension fund of the Peet Packing Co. in Chesaning.
- December 13 - David Adamany announced his retirement as the 8th president of Wayne State University, a position he held since 1983.
- December 16 - Gov. John Engler designated 11 economically-depressed "renaissance zones" across the state where residents would owe no state or local income, property or business taxes for up to 15 years. The zones included parts of Detroit, Warren, Lansing, Flint, Saginaw, Grand Rapids, and the western Upper Peninsula.
- December 18 - Michigan announced a three-month test in which the speed limited would be increased to 70 miles per hour on 85% of the state's interstate highways.
- December 20 - Gov. John Engler appointed five persons to serve on the new Michigan Gaming Control Board, having the taks of ensuring that the three casinos planned for Detroit would be operated honestly. The appointees were Thomas Denomme of Chrysler, lawyer Taylor Segue III, former Michigan first lady Paula Blanchard, former director of state police Ritchie Davis, and retired judge Michael Stacey.
- December 21 - Detroit NAACP president Wendell Anthony urged African-Americans to stay out of Dearborn, including Fairlane Town Center shopping mall, alleging that the spirity of racist former mayor Orville Hubbard was still hovering over the city.
- December 26 - Three days after the final game of a season in which the Detroit Lions went 5–11, Wayne Fontes was fired as head coach.

== Births ==
- March 13 - Gabby DeLoof, freestyle swimmer, 5x gold medalist at 2019 World University Games, in Grosse Pointe, Michigan
- May 21 - Chase Sui Wonders, actress, screenwriter, model, in Bloomfield Hills
- July 13 - Jena Irene Asciutto, singer-songwriter, American Idol runner-up, in Farmington Hills
- July 30 - Dylan Larkin, hockey player for UM (2014-15), Detroit Red Wings (2014-2025), in Waterford Township, Michigan
- October 29 - Hannah Miller, figure skater, raised in Williamston, Michigan
- November 20 - Tarik Skubal, Detroit Tigers pitcher, 2x Cy Young Award, in California
- November 21 - Tyler Mabry, tight end, in Ypislanti

== Deaths ==
- January 8 - Robert Moyers, leader in orthodontics, at age 76
- January 10 - Joe Schultz Jr., MLB player (1939-48), Detroit Tigers manager (1973) and coach (1971-76), at age 77
- January 11 - Roger Crozier, Detroit Red Wings goalie (1963–1970), at age 53
- January 24 - Tom Tracy, CFL/NFL halfback-fullback (1955-64), at age 61
- January 28 - Joseph Brodsky, Nobel Prize in literature, professor at U-M, at age 55
- April 19 - Ken Doherty, US decathlon champion (1928–29), track coach at U-M (1930–48), at age 90
- May 6 - Donald T. Campbell, social scientist, coined term evolutionary epistemology, at age 79
- May 7 - Patricia Beeman, East Lansing-based leaders of efforts to fight apartheid in South Africa, at age 70
- May 16 - Olga Madar, first woman to serve on United Auto Workers International Executive Boards, at age 80
- May 17 - Scott Brayton, race car driver, died in a crash at Indianapolis 500, at age 37
- May 19 - Tom Kuzma, U-M halfback (1941), at age 74
- May 30 - Arthur Ross, singer, songwriter, younger brother of Diana Ross, at age 47
- June 27 - Merze Tate, first African-American graduate of Western Michigan, first African-American woman to attend the University of Oxford, at age 91
- July 10 - Alex Manoogian, businessman who founded Masco, donated the Manoogian Mansion to Detroit, at age 95
- August 13 - T. John Lesinski, lieutenant governor (1961–65), at age 71
- August 31 - Richard E. Cross, automobile executive, lawyer, and civil rights activist, at age 85
- September 6 - Barney McCosky, Detroit Tigers outfielder (1939–46), at age 79
- October 4 - Alma Routsong, novlist known for lesbian fiction, at age 71
- October 15 - Robert F. Williams, civil rights leader, at age 71
- November 14 - Elman Service, cultural anthropologist who joined the Abraham Lincoln brigade during the Spanish Civil War, at age 81
- November 18 - Greer Lankton, transgedner artist known for lifelike sewn dolls, at age 38
- November 20 - Jimmy Butsicaris, owner of Lindell Athletic Club lounge in Detroit
- November 22 - Stephanie Bachelor, film actress, at age 84
- November 22 - Mark Lenard, actor (Spock's father in Star Trek) raised in South Haven, at age 72
- November 30 - Ted Petoskey, three-sport star at U-M (1931–34), at age 85
- December 23 - Rodney Culver, football running back (1990-1995), at age 26 with his wife on board ValuJet Flight 592
- December 25 - Tony Dauksza, football player, filmmaker, outdoorsman, at age 84
- December 30 - Lucille H. McCollough, Michigan legislature (1955-1982), her 100% voting attendances for 37 years is recorded in Guinness Book of World Records, at age 90

== See also ==
- 1996 in the United States
