= 1995 in Michigan =

- Decades: 1970s; 1980s; 1990s; 2000s; 2010s
- See also: History of Michigan; Historical outline of Michigan; List of years in Michigan; 1995 in the United States

This article reviews 1995 in Michigan, including the state's office holders, performance of sports teams, a chronology of the state's top news and sports stories, and notable Michigan-related births and deaths.

== Top Michigan news stories ==
- The Michigan Militia received media attention after connections were revealed between Oklahoma City bomber Timothy McVeigh and Michigan co-conspirator Terry Nichols and the Michigan Milita.
- The resignation of Gary Moeller after his arrest on charges of disorderly conduct and assault and battery at a Southfield restaurant on April 28
- Michigan men's swimming team led by coach Jon Urbanchek won the program's first national championship since 1961.
- Serial rapist Ervin Mitchell convicted by a jury in June 1995.
- Pistons select Grant Hill with the number one pick in the NBA draft.

== Office holders ==
=== State office holders ===
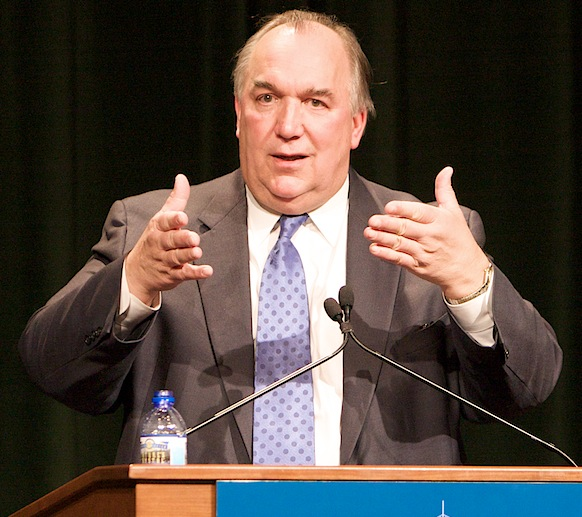
Gov. Engler

- Governor of Michigan: John Engler (Republican)
- Lieutenant Governor of Michigan: Connie Binsfeld (Republican)
- Michigan Attorney General: Frank J. Kelley (Democrat)
- Michigan Secretary of State: Candice Miller (Republican)
- Speaker of the Michigan House of Representatives: Paul Hillegonds (Republican)
- Majority Leader of the Michigan Senate: Dick Posthumus (Republican)
- Chief Justice, Michigan Supreme Court: James H. Brickley

=== Mayors of major cities ===
- Mayor of Detroit: Dennis Archer
- Mayor of Grand Rapids: John H. Logie
- Mayor of Warren, Michigan: Ronald L. Bonkowski/Mark Steenbergh
- Mayor of Flint: Woodrow Stanley
- Mayor of Dearborn: Michael Guido
- Mayor of Lansing: David Hollister
- Mayor of Ann Arbor: Ingrid Sheldon
- Mayor of Saginaw: Gary L. Loster

=== Federal office holders ===
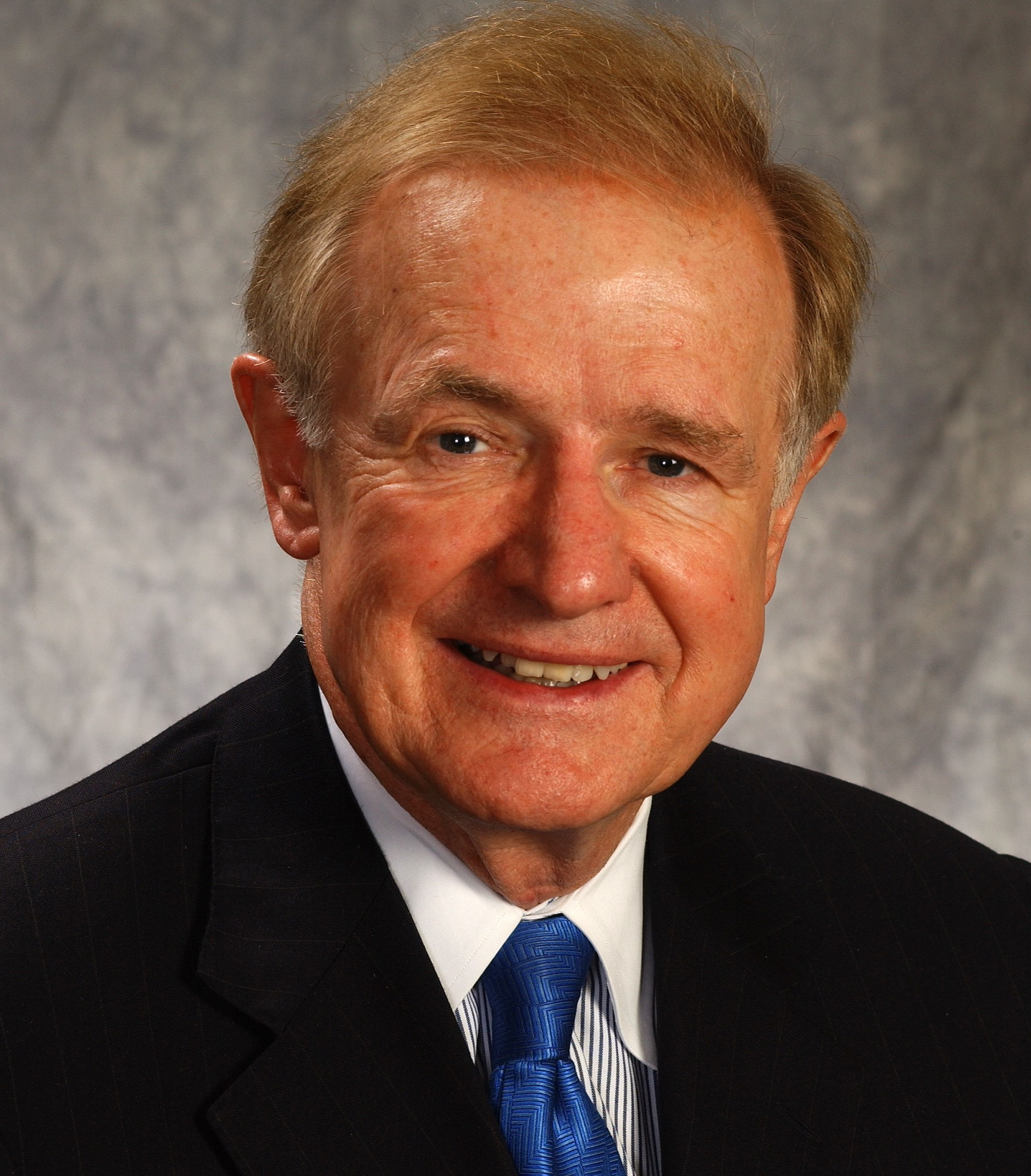
Sen. Riegle

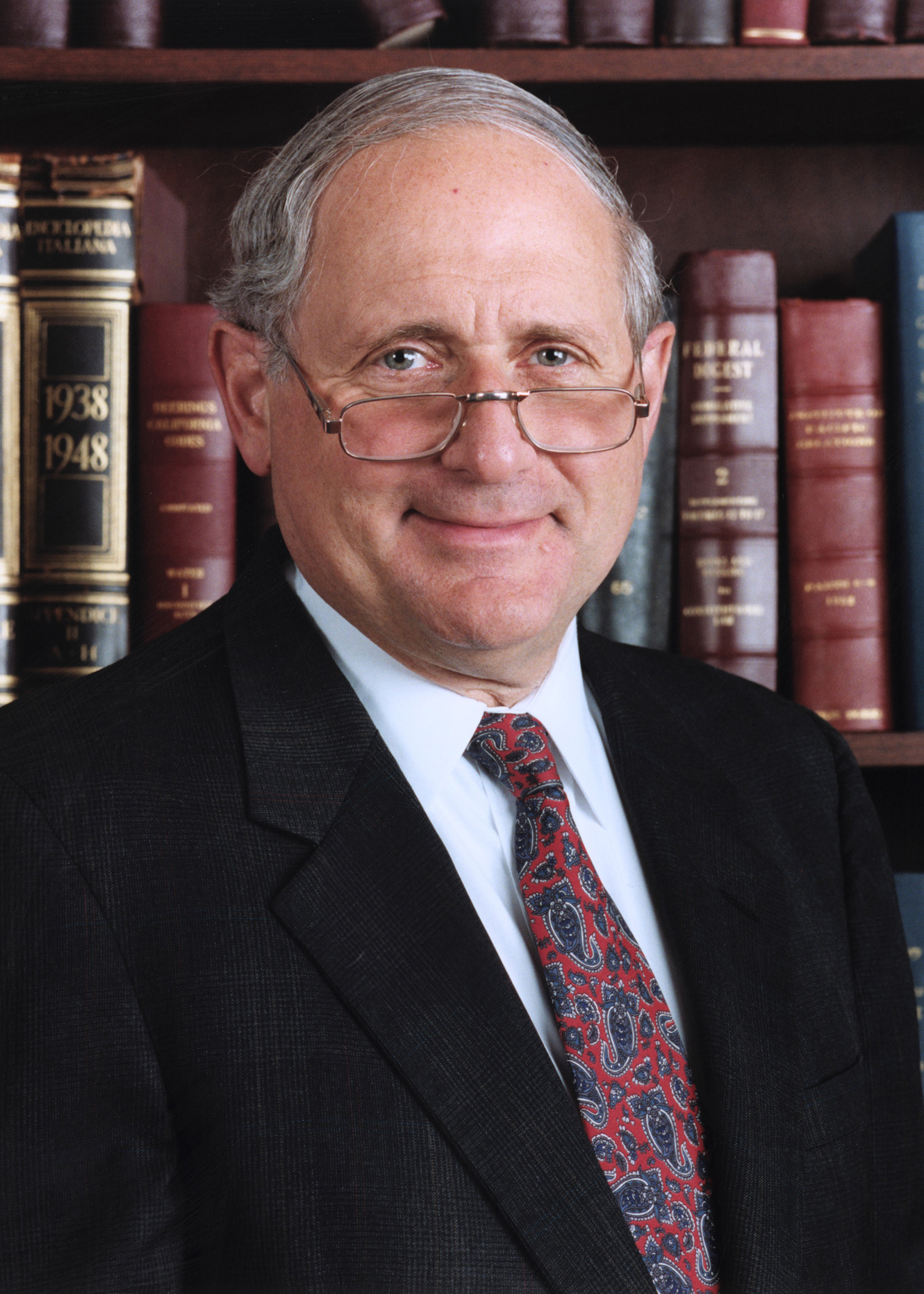
Sen. Levin

- U.S. Senator from Michigan: Spencer Abraham (Republican)
- U.S. Senator from Michigan: Carl Levin (Democrat)
- House District 1: Bart Stupak (Democrat)
- House District 2: Pete Hoekstra (Republican)
- House District 3: Vern Ehlers (Republican)
- House District 4: Dave Camp (Republican)
- House District 5: James A. Barcia (Democrat)
- House District 6: Fred Upton (Republican)
- House District 7: Nick Smith (Republican)
- House District 8: Milton Robert Carr (Democrat)
- House District 9: Dale Kildee (Democrat)
- House District 10: David Bonior (Democrat)
- House District 11: Joe Knollenberg (Republican)
- House District 12: Sander Levin (Democrat)
- House District 13: Lynn Rivers (Democrat)
- House District 14: John Conyers (Democrat)
- House District 15: Barbara-Rose Collins (Democrat)
- House District 16: John Dingell (Democrat)

== Sports ==
=== Baseball ===
- 1995 Detroit Tigers season – Under manager Sparky Anderson, the Tigers compiled a 53–62 record and finished fifth in American League East. The team's statistical leaders included Junior Felix with a .306 batting average, Cecil Fielder with 28 home runs and 90 RBIs, Mike Moore with 11 wins, and Storm Davis with a 3.56 earned run average.

=== American football ===
- 1995 Detroit Lions season – Under head coach Wayne Fontes, the Lions compiled a 10–6 record. The team's statistical leaders included Scott Mitchell (4,338 passing yards), Barry Sanders (1,500 rushing yards), and Herman Moore (1,686 receiving yards).
- 1995 Michigan Wolverines football team – In their first season under head coach Lloyd Carr, the Wolverines compiled a 9–4 record, lost to Texas A&M in the Alamo Bowl, and were ranked No. 17 in the final AP poll. The team's statistical leaders included Brian Griese (1,395 passing yards), Tshimanga Biakabutuka (1,724 rushing yards), and Mercury Hayes (888 receiving yards).
- 1995 Michigan State Spartans football team – In their first season under head coach Nick Saban, the Spartans compiled a 6–5–1 record. The team's statistical leaders included Tony Banks (1,741 passing yards), Marc Renaud (978 rushing yards), and Derrick Mason (713 receiving yards).

=== Basketball ===
- 1994–95 Detroit Pistons season – Under head coach Don Chaney, the Pistons compiled a 28–54 record. The team selected Grant Hill with the third overall pick in the NBA draft. In his first season in the NBA, Hill led the team with 1,394 points scored. The team's other statistical leaders included Joe Dumars (368 assists) and Terry Mills (558 rebounds).

=== Ice hockey ===
- 1994–95 Detroit Red Wings season – Under head coach Scotty Bowman, the Red Wings compiled a 33–11–4 record and lost to the San Jose Sharks in the conference quarterfinals. Sergei Federov led the team with 56 goals, 64 assists, and 120 points.

=== Other ===
- 1995 Big Ten softball tournament - finals held in Ann Arbor, Michigan won the title
- 1995 GM Goodwrench Dealer 400
- 1995 Miller Genuine Draft 400 (Michigan)
- 1995 Michigan 500
- Motor City Mustangs
- 1995 Skate America

== Births ==
- March 29 - Kay Felder, basketball point guard, in Detroit
- July 21 - Bill G. Schuette, Michigan politician
- July 24 - Kyle Kuzma, basketball player, in Flint

== Deaths ==
- January 11 - Joseph Gingold, concertmaster and violinist with Detroit Symphony Orchestra, at age 85
- February 9 - David Wayne, actor and singer, at age 81
- February 23 - Melvin Franklin, singer with The Temptations, at age 52
- February 23 - Margaret Woodbridge, swimmer for Detroit Athletic Club, gold medalist at 1920 Olympics, at age 93
- April 16 - August E. Johansen, US Congress (1955–65), at age 89
- April 22 - Jane Kenyon, poet, at age 47
- April 24 - Emelia Christine Schaub, Michigan's first elected woman prosecutor
- May 16 - Harold Schultz, Marine corporal who raised the flage atop Mount Suribachi during the Battle of Iwo Jima, at age 70
- June 7 - Eddie Lake, Detroit Tigers shortstop (1946–1950)
- June 23 - Jonas Salk, virologist and researcher who developed polo vaccines, at age 80
- June 24 - Andrew J. Transue, US Congress (1937–39), at age 92
- July 26 - George W. Romney, Governor of Michigan (1963–69), at age 88
- July 27 - Rick Ferrell, Hall of Fame catcher, Detroit Tigers executive, at age 89
- August 10 - Baba Rexheb, Albanian Muslim scholar and Sufi, founder of Bektashi tekke in Taylor, at age 93
- August 16 - J. P. McCarthy, Detroit radio personality, 30 years as the morning man and interviewer on WJR, at age 62
- August 16 - Bobby DeBarge, singer and musician, at age 39
- August 24 - Richard Degener, 1936 Olympic gold medalist in diving
- August 26 - Ronnie White, co-founder of the Miracles, discovered Stevie Wonder, at age 57
- September 19 - Mr. Bo, blues guitarist, singer and songwriter, at age 63
- October 21 - Vada Pinson, Detroit Tigers coach (1985–91), at age 57
- October 31 - Jim Campbell, Detroit Tigers general manager (1962–83), at age 71
- November 23 - Junior Walker, singer and saxophonist, in Battle Creek
- December 5 - Bill Bruton, Detroit Tigers outfielder (1961–64), at age 70
- December 22 - Ferris Jennings, UM quarterback (1934–36), at age 82

== See also ==
- 1995 in the United States
