= 1992 in Michigan =

- Decades: 1970s; 1980s; 1990s; 2000s; 2010s
- See also: History of Michigan; Historical outline of Michigan; List of years in Michigan; 1992 in the United States

This article reviews 1992 in Michigan, including the state's office holders, demographics, performance of sports teams, cultural events, a chronology of the state's top news and sports stories, and notable Michigan-related births and deaths.

== Top Michigan news stories ==
Broadcast and newspaper members of the Associated Press voted on the top news stories in Michigan for 1992 as follows:

1. General Motors' problems with plant closings, labor unrest, and management upheaval
2. Presidential candidates in Michigan. In the 1992 United States presidential election between George H. W. Bush, Bill Clinton, and Ross Perot, the candidates made repeated visits to the state. The final presidential debate was held at Michigan State University in East Landing on October 19, 1992.
3. Jack Kevorkian's acquittal of murder and his role in assisting five additional suicides during the year
4. The death of Malice Green and prosecution of four Detroit police officers
5. Changes in Michigan's Congressional delegation including the loss of two seats due to reapportionment
6. Leslie Williams case. The arrest and conviction of 38-year-old serial killer Leslie Williams. Williams was paroled from prison in August 1990 and went on a crime spree that included murdering four teenage girls (Cynthia Jones, sisters Michelle and Melissa Urbin, and Kami Villanueva), raping a nine-year-old, kidnapping a woman, and sexually assaulting other women. He was arrested in May 1992 when a witness saw him in the act of abducting a woman in a cemetery. Williams grew up in Garden City, Michigan, where his mother was a prostitute and his father was convicted of sexually molesting two step-daughters. Williams had a long criminal history and had been declared a habitual offender after he was convicted in 1983 of assault with intent to kidnap and to sexually penetrate.
7. Welfare reform. Changes in Michigan's welfare system, including a request that recipients work, go to school, or volunteer their time.
8. Dow Corning breast implants controversy. Facing mass litigation over leaks from its silicone breast implants, Dow Corning announced in March 1992 that it would cease manufacturing the implants.
9. Conviction of William Hart. In May 1992, a federal jury found former Detroit Police Chief William Hart guilty of embezzling almost $2.6 million from the City of Detroit. Hart in 1976 became the first African-American police chief in a major U.S. city.
10. Magic Johnson's return to the NBA and subsequent retirement and a lawsuit by a woman alleging that Johnson had infected her with the AIDS virus

== Office holders ==
=== State office holders ===
- Governor of Michigan: John Engler (Republican)
- Lieutenant Governor of Michigan: Connie Binsfeld (Republican)
- Michigan Attorney General: Frank J. Kelley (Democrat)
- Michigan Secretary of State: Richard H. Austin (Democrat)
- Speaker of the Michigan House of Representatives: Lewis N. Dodak (Democrat)
- Majority Leader of the Michigan Senate: Dick Posthumus (Republican)
- Chief Justice, Michigan Supreme Court: Michael Cavanagh

=== Mayors of major cities ===
- Mayor of Detroit: Coleman Young
- Mayor of Grand Rapids: Gerald R. Helmholdt
- Mayor of Warren, Michigan: Ronald L. Bonkowski
- Mayor of Sterling Heights, Michigan: Stephen M. Rice
- Mayor of Flint: Woodrow Stanley
- Mayor of Dearborn: Michael Guido
- Mayor of Lansing: Terry John McKane
- Mayor of Ann Arbor: Elizabeth Brater
- Mayor of Saginaw: Henry H. Nickleberry

=== Federal office holders ===
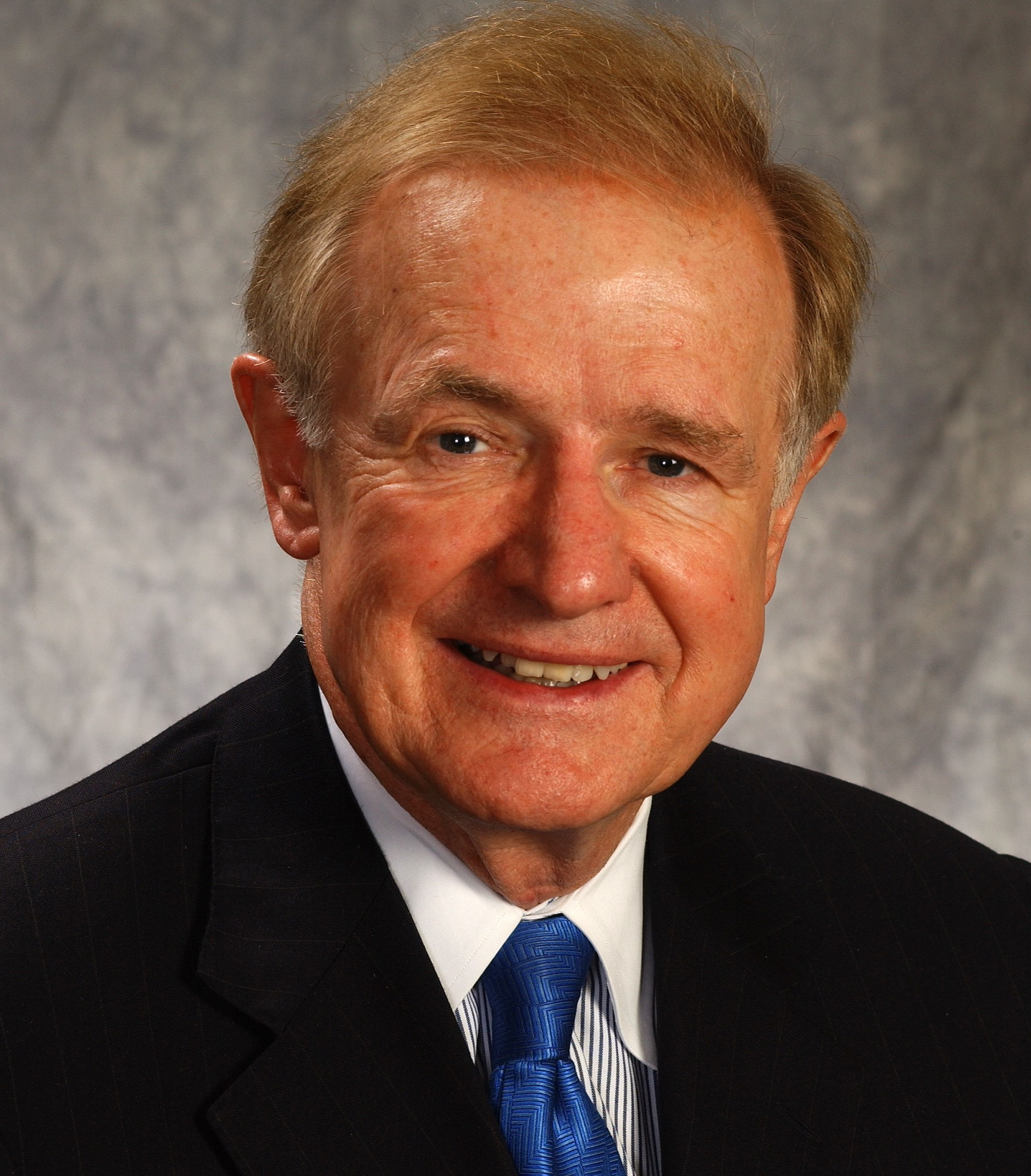
Sen. Riegle

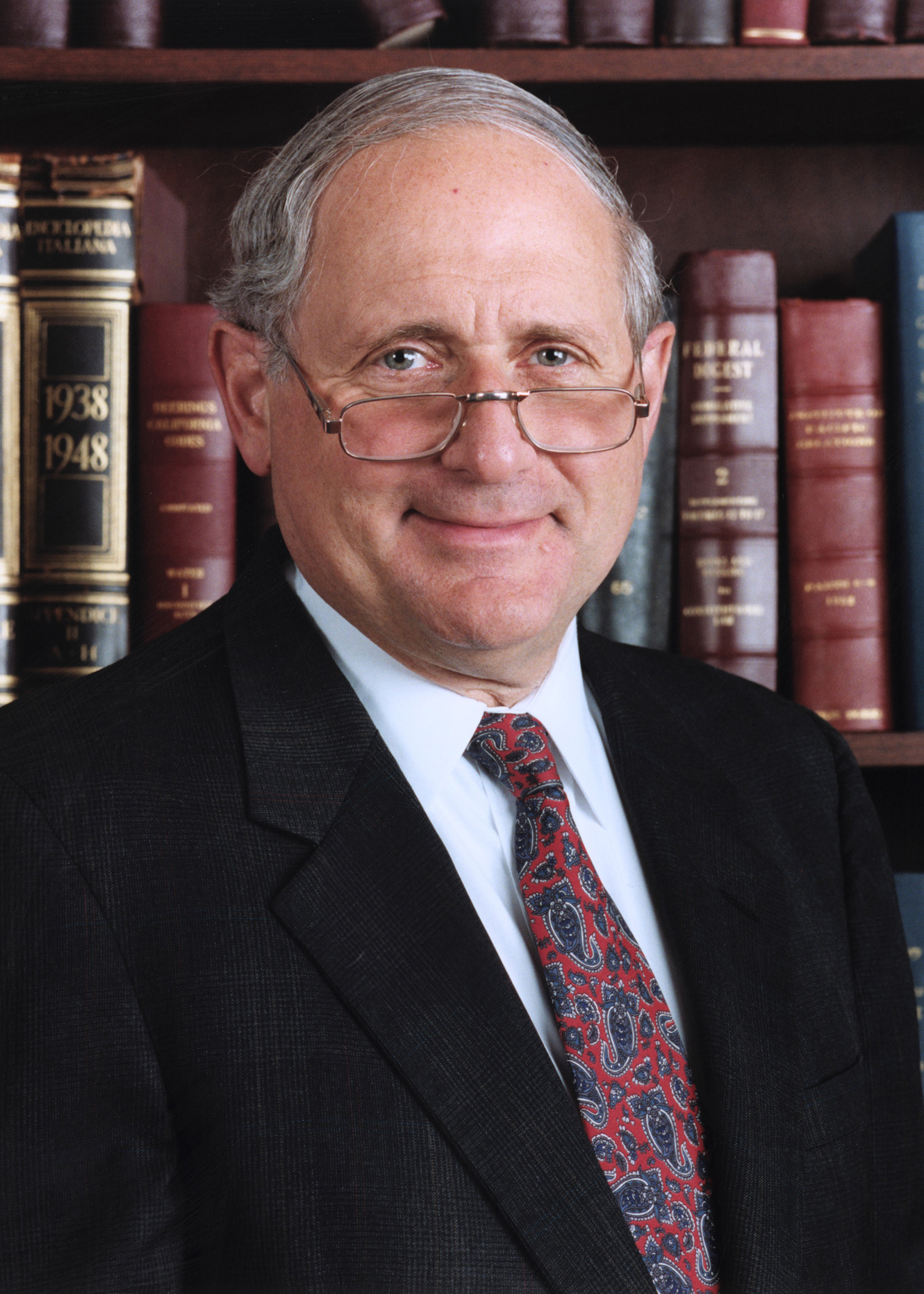
Sen. Levin

- U.S. Senator from Michigan: Donald W. Riegle Jr. (Democrat)
- U.S. Senator from Michigan: Carl Levin (Democrat)
- House District 1: John Conyers (Democrat)
- House District 2: Carl Pursell (Republican)
- House District 3: Howard Wolpe (Republican)
- House District 4: Fred Upton (Republican)
- House District 5: Paul B. Henry (Republican)
- House District 6: Bob Carr (Democrat)
- House District 7: Dale Kildee (Democrat)
- House District 8: J. Bob Traxler (Democrat)
- House District 9: Guy Vander Jagt (Republican)
- House District 10: Dave Camp (Republican)
- House District 11: Robert William Davis (Republican)
- House District 12: David Bonior (Democrat)
- House District 13: Barbara-Rose Collins (Democrat)
- House District 14: Dennis M. Hertel (Democrat)
- House District 15: William D. Ford (Democrat)
- House District 16: John Dingell (Democrat)
- House District 17: Sander Levin (Democrat)
- House District 18: William Broomfield (Republican)

== Population ==
In the 1990 United States census, Michigan was recorded as having a population of 9,295,29 persons, ranking as the eighth most populous state in the country. By 2000, the state's population had grown by 6.9% to 9,938,444 persons.

=== Cities ===
The following is a list of cities in Michigan with a population of at least 50,000 based on 1990 U.S. Census data. Historic census data from 1980 and 2000 is included to reflect trends in population increases or decreases. Cities that are part of the Detroit metropolitan area are shaded in tan.

1990 Rank	City	County	1980 Pop.	1990 Pop.	2000 Pop.	Change 1990-2000
1	Detroit	Wayne	1,203,368	1,027,974	951,270	−7.5% ▼
2	Grand Rapids	Kent	181,843	189,126	197,800	4.6% ▲
3	Warren	Macomb	161,134	144,864	138,247	−4.6% ▼
4	Flint	Genesee	159,611	140,761	124,943	−11.2% ▼
5	Lansing	Ingham	130,414	127,321	119,128	−6.4% ▼
6	Sterling Heights	Macomb	108,999	117,810	124,471	5.7% ▲
7	Ann Arbor	Washtenaw	107,969	109,592	114,024	4.0% ▲
8	Livonia	Wayne	104,814	100,850	100,545	−0.3% ▼
9	Dearborn	Wayne	90,660	89,286	97,775	9.5%▼
10	Westland	Wayne	84,603	84,724	86,602	2.2% ▲
11	Kalamazoo	Kalamazoo	79,722	80,277	76,145	−5.1% ▼
12	Southfield	Oakland	75,608	75,745	78,322	3.4% ▲
13	Farmington Hills	Oakland	58,056	74,611	82,111	10.1% ▲
14	Troy	Oakland	67,102	72,884	80,959	11.1% ▲
15	Pontiac	Oakland	76,715	71,166	66,337	−6.8% ▼
16	Taylor	Wayne	77,568	70,811	65,868	−7.0% ▼
17	Saginaw	Saginaw	77,508	69,512	61,799	−11.1% ▼
18	St. Clair Shores	Macomb	76,210	68,107	63,096	−7.4% ▼
19	Royal Oak	Oakland	70,893	65,410	60,062	−8.2% ▼
20	Wyoming	Kent	59,616	63,891	69,368	8.6% ▲
21	Dearborn Heights	Wayne	67,706	60,838	58,264	−4.2% ▼
22	Roseville	Wayne	54,311	51,412	48,129	−6.4% ▼
23	East Lansing	Ingham	51,392	50,677	46,525	−8.2% ▼

=== Counties ===
The following is a list of counties in Michigan with populations of at least 150,000 based on 1990 U.S. Census data. Historic census data from 1980 and 2000 are included to reflect trends in population increases or decreases. Counties that are part of the Detroit metropolitan area are shaded in tan.

1990 Rank	County	Largest city	1980 Pop.	1990 Pop.	2000 Pop.	Change 1900-2000
1	Wayne	Detroit	2,337,891	2,111,687	2,061,162	−2.4% ▼
2	Oakland	Pontiac	1,011,793	1,083,592	1,194,156	10.2% ▲
3	Macomb	Warren	694,600	717,400	788,149	9.9% ▲
4	Kent	Grand Rapids	444,506	500,631	574,335	14.7% ▲
5	Genesee	Flint	450,449	430,459	436,141	1.3% ▼
6	Washtenaw	Ann Arbor	264,748	282,937	322,895	14.1% ▲
7	Ingham	Lansing	275,520	281,912	279,320	−0.9% ▼
8	Kalamazoo	Kalamazoo	212,378	223,411	238,603	6.8% ▲
9	Saginaw	Saginaw	228,059	211,946	210,039	−0.9% ▼
10	Ottawa	Holland	157,174	187,768	238,314	26.9% ▲
11	Berrien	Benton Harbor	171,276	161,378	162,453	0.6% ▲
12	Muskegon	Muskegon	157,589	158,983	170,200	7.1% ▲
13	Jackson	Jackson	151,495	149,756	158,422	5.8% ▼

== Sports ==
=== Baseball ===
- 1992 Detroit Tigers season – Under manager Sparky Anderson, the Tigers compiled a 75–87 record and finished sixth in American League East. The team's statistical leaders included Scott Livingstone with a .282 batting average, Cecil Fielder with 35 home runs and 124 RBIs, Bill Gullickson with 14 wins, and John Kiely with a 2.13 earned run average.

=== American football ===
- 1992 Detroit Lions season – Under head coach Wayne Fontes, the Lions compiled a 5–11 record and finished third in the NFC Central Division. The team's statistical leaders included Rodney Peete with 1,702 passing yards, Barry Sanders with 1,352 rushing yards, Herman Moore with 966 receiving yards, and Jason Hanson with 93 points scored.
- 1992 Michigan Wolverines football team – Under head coach Gary Moeller, the Wolverines compiled a 9–0–3 record, won the Big Ten Conference championship, defeated Washington in the 1993 Rose Bowl, and were ranked No. 5 in the final AP poll. The team's statistical leaders included Elvis Grbac with 1,640 passing yards, Tyrone Wheatley with 1,357 rushing yards and 102 points scored, and Derrick Alexander with 740 receiving yards.
- 1992 Michigan State Spartans football team – Under head coach George Perles, the Spartans compiled a 3–8 record. The team's statistical leaders included Jim Miller with 1,400 passing yards, Tico Duckett with 1,021 rushing yards, Mill Coleman with 586 receiving yards, and Craig Thomas with 90 points scored.
- 1992 Detroit Drive season

=== Basketball ===
- 1991–92 Detroit Pistons season – Under head coach Chuck Daly, the Pistons compiled a 48–34 record, finished third in the NBA's Central Division, and lost to the New York Knicks in the first round of the playoffs. The team's statistical leaders included Joe Dumars with 1,635 points scored, Isaiah Thomas with 560 assists, and Dennis Rodman with 1,530 rebounds.
- 1991–92 Michigan Wolverines men's basketball team - Under head coach Steve Fisher, the team compiled a 24-8 record and advanced to the Final Four, losing to Duke in the national final. The season was the rookie year for the Fab Five. The team's statistical leaders included Jalen Rose with 597 points and 135 assists and Chris Webber with 340 rebounds.

=== Ice hockey ===
- 1991–92 Detroit Red Wings season – Under head coach Bryan Murray, the Red Wings compiled a 43–25–12 record, finished first in the NHL Norris Division, and lost to the Chicago Blackhawks in the division finals. Steve Yzerman led the team with 45 goals, 58 assists, and 103 points. The team's principal goaltender was Tim Cheveldae (72 games).

== Births ==
- January 6 - Diona Reasonover, actress, in Detroit
- January 7 - Børns, singer, songwriter, and musician, in Muskegon, MI
- February 11 - Taylor Lautner, actor (Jacob Black in The Twilight Saga film series), in Grand Rapids
- February 11 - Max Bullough, football player, in Traverse City
- February 20 - Timothy Hwang, business manner and co-founder FiscalNote, in East Lansing
- March 6 - Kevin Gravel, hockey player, in Kingsford
- March 17 - Chad Finley, stock car driver, in Detroit
- March 30 - Johnathan Hankins, defensive tackle, in Dearborn Heights
- May 6 - Quinn XCII (Quinn 92), singer-songwriter, in Grosse Pointe
- May 6 - Sir'Dominic Pointer, basketball player, in Detroit
- May 29 - Patrick Brown, hockey player, in Bloomfield Hills
- June 10 - Kate Upton, model and actress, in St. Joseph
- June 10 - Nita Englund, ski jumper, in Iron Mountain
- June 27 - Beau LaFave, politician, in Iron Mountain
- June 30 - Nicole Franzel, television personality, in Ubly
- July 2 - Tony Lippett, cornerback, in Detroit
- July 2 - Devin Oliver, basketball player, in Kalamazoo
- July 13 - Ahney Her, actress, in Lansing
- August 11 - Hannah McGowan, hockey player, in Redfor
- August 17 - Soony Saad, soccer player, in Wyandotte
- August 24 - Angus MacLellan, rugby player, in Traverse City
- September 3 - Mari Manoogian, politician, in Birmingham
- September 4 - Kevin Lee, mixed martial artist, in Grand Rapids
- September 21 - Devyn Marble, basketball player, in Flint
- October 3 - Billy Strings, guitarist, singer, songwriter, in Ionia
- October 12 - Sara Driesenga, softball player, coach, in Hudsonville
- October 23 - Justin Zimmer, defensive tackle, in Grand Rapids
- November 9 - CoryxKenshin, YouTuber, in Detroit
- November 17 - Sada Baby, rapper and singer, in Detroit
- November 21 - Megan and Liz, American pop duo and twins, in Edwardsburg
- December 12 - Austin Czarnik, hockey player, in Washington Township
- December 18 - Eric Haase, baseball catcher and outfielder, in Detroit
- December 31 - Gerry Mayhew, hockey player, in Wyandotte
- 1992 - Andrew Beeler, politician, in Port Huron

=== Gallery of 1992 births ===
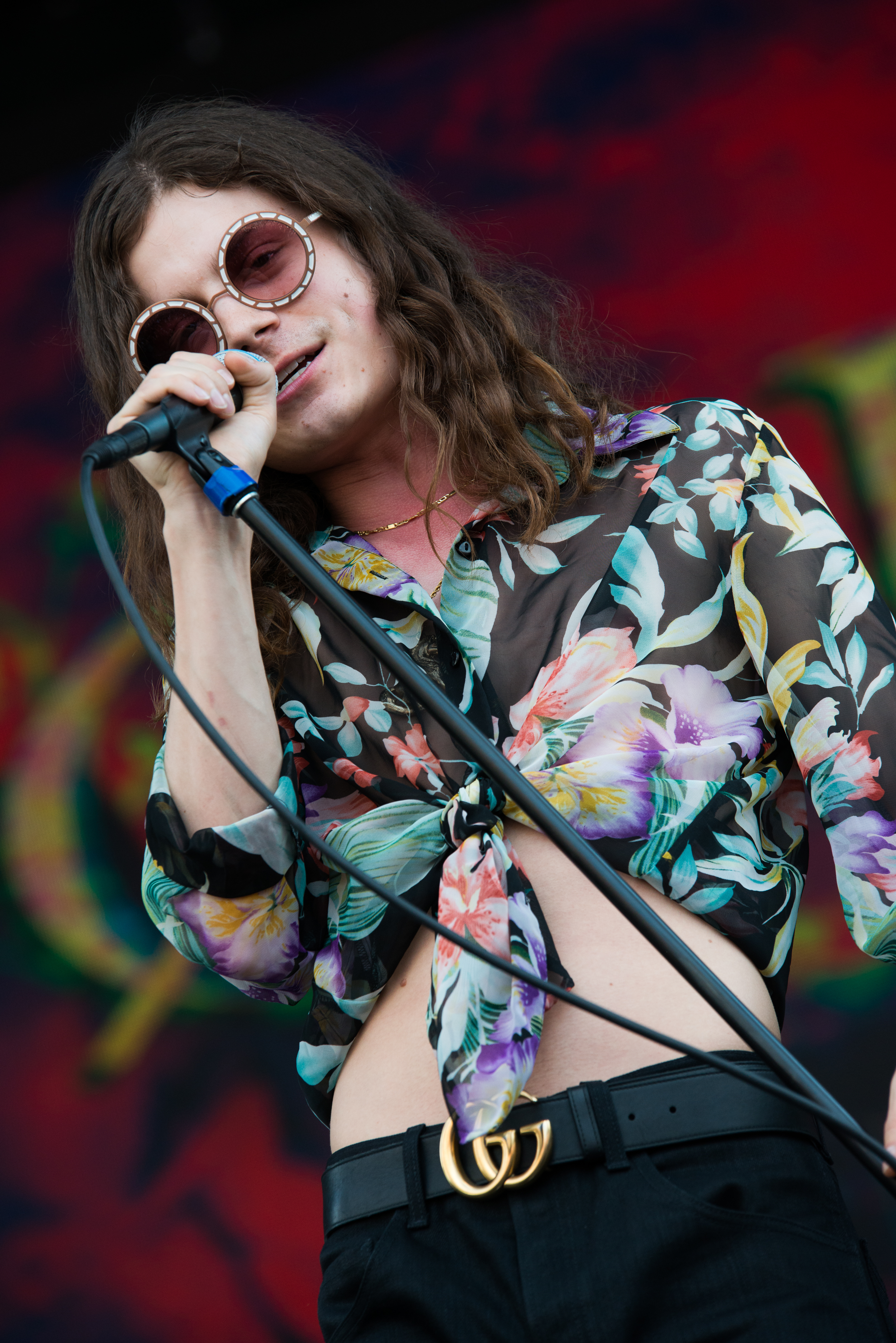
Børns

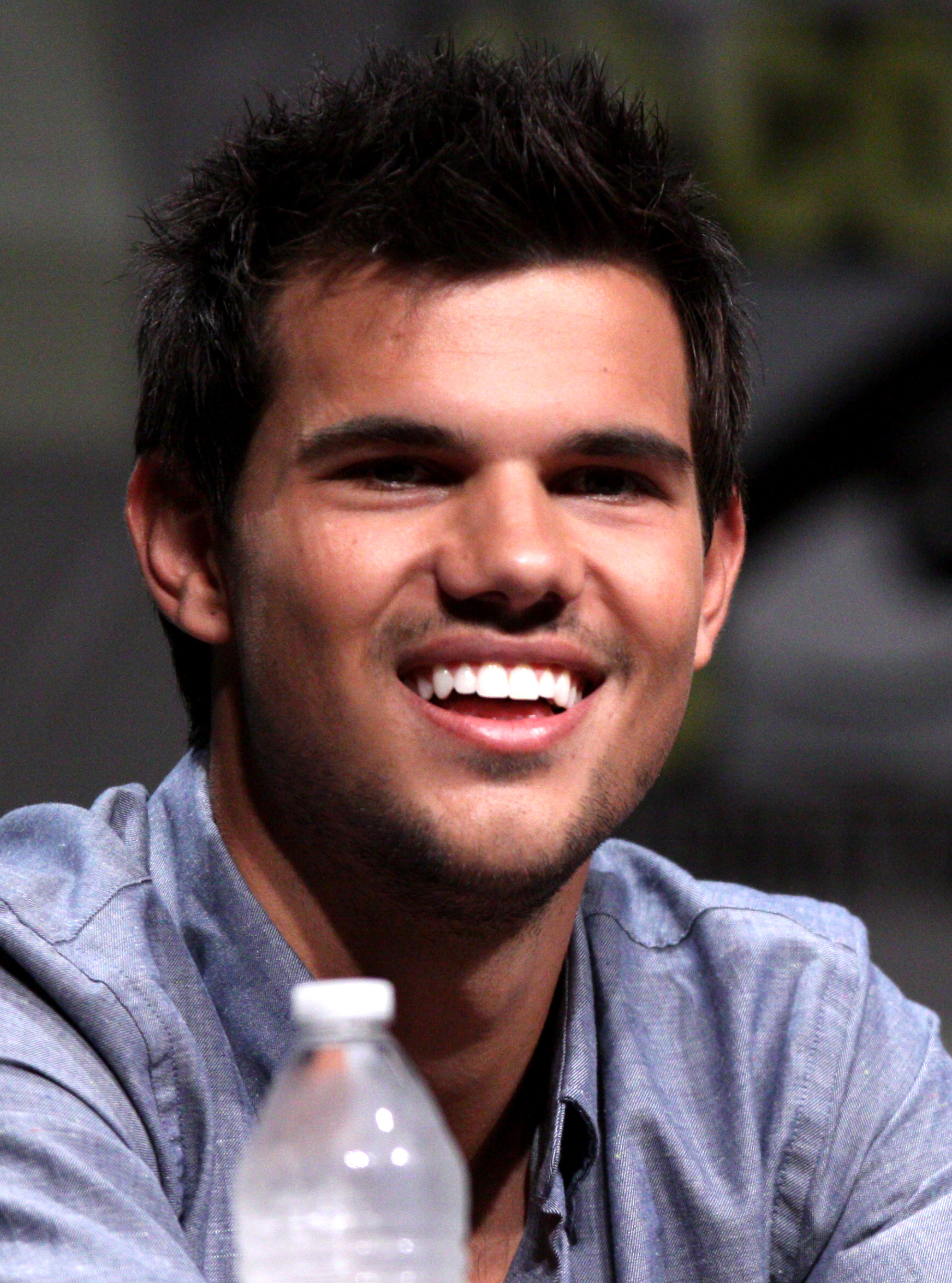
Taylor Lautner

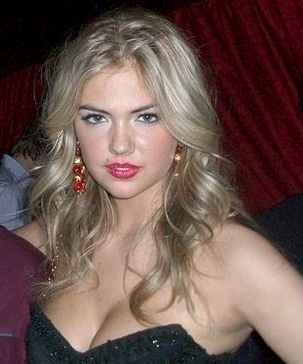
Kate Upton

== Deaths ==
- February 1 - Otto Pommerening, All-American tackle at Michigan, at age 88 in West Bloomfield
- February 20 - Dick York, actor (Bewitched, Inherit the Wind), at age 63 in East Grand Rapids
- March 28 - Ernie Caddel, halfback for Detroit Lions 1934-1938, at age 81 in Roseville, California
- March 31 - Doug Roby, University of Michigan athlete and member of International Olympic Committee, at age 94 in Ann Arbor
- June 6 - E. Harold Munn, Chairman of the Prohibition Party (1955–1971), at age 88 in Hillsdale
- July 26 - Mary Wells, Motown singer (My Guy, Two Lovers, You Beat Me to the Punch, at age 49 in Los Angeles
- September 6 - Pat Harder, fullback for Detroit Lions NFL championship teams of 1951 and 1952, at age 70 in Waukesha, Wisconsin
- September 18 - Earl Van Dyke, main keyboardist for Motown's The Funk Brothers, at age 62 in Detroit
- September 22 - Aurelio López, pitcher for the Detroit Tigers known as "Señor Smoke", at age 44 in Mexico
- October 5 - Eddie Kendricks, member of The Temptations and lead vocalist on "The Way You Do The Things You Do", "Get Ready", and "Just My Imagination (Running Away with Me)", at age 52 in Birmingham, Alabama
- November 5 - Malice Green, African-American man whose death after police beating sparked controversy, at age 35 in Detroit

=== Gallery of 1992 deaths ===
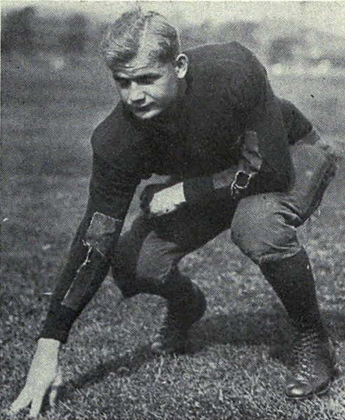
Otto Pommerening

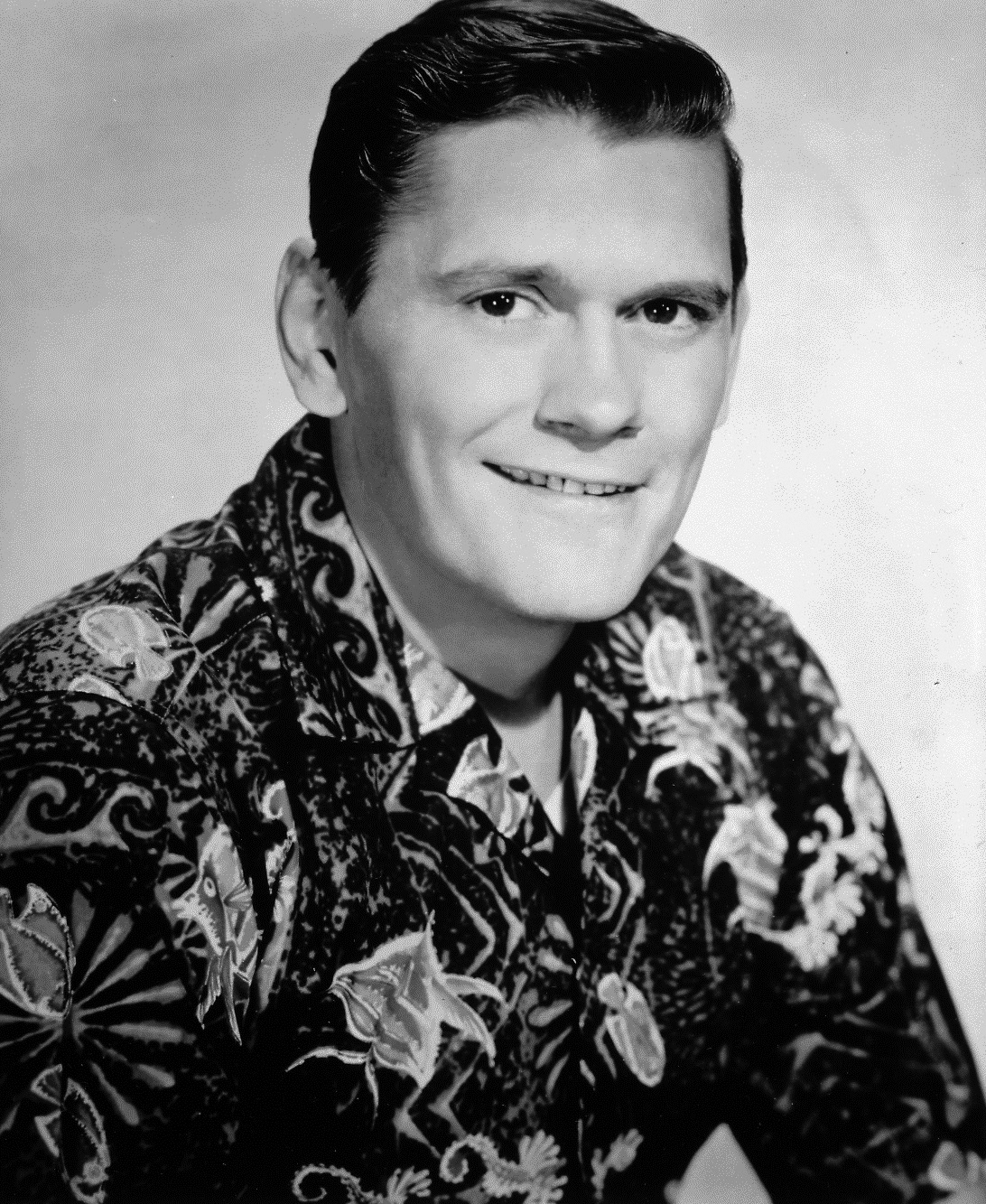
Dick York

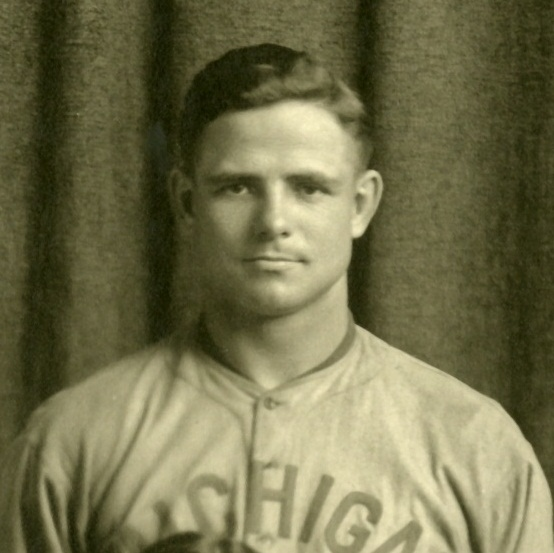
Doug Roby

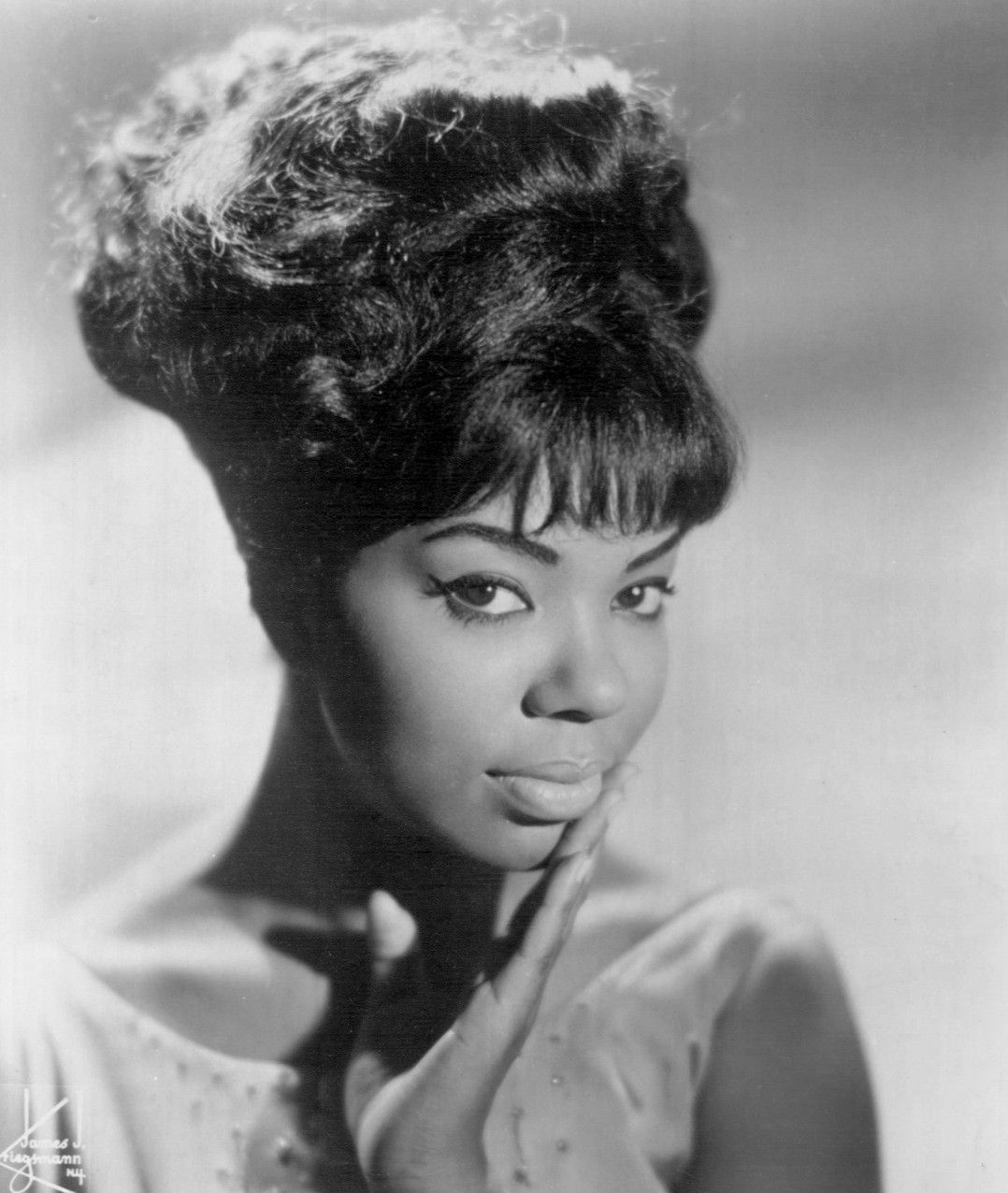
Mary Wells

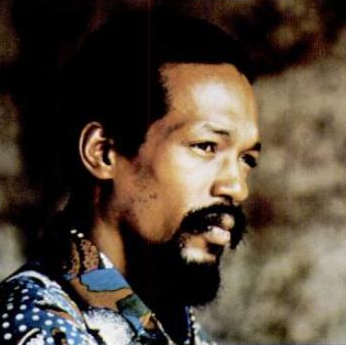
Eddie Kendricks

== See also ==
- History of Michigan
- History of Detroit
