= 1994 in Michigan =

- Decades: 1970s; 1980s; 1990s; 2000s; 2010s
- See also: History of Michigan; Historical outline of Michigan; List of years in Michigan; 1994 in the United States

This article reviews 1994 in Michigan, including the state's office holders, demographics, performance of sports teams, cultural events, a chronology of the state's top news and sports stories, and notable Michigan-related births and deaths.

== Top Michigan news stories ==
Newspaper editors and broadcast news directors voted on the top news stories in Michigan for 1994 as follows:

1. Republican election victories. November 8 election in which John Engler was reelected to a second term as Governor and Spencer Abraham was elected U.S. Senator. In the Michigan gubernatorial election, 1994, Engler defeated Democrat Howard Wolpe by a margin of 61.5% to 38.5%. In the United States Senate election in Michigan, 1994, Abraham defeated Democrat Bob Carr by a margin of 52% to 43% with Libertarian Jon Coon receiving 4% of the votes.
2. Proposal A tax reform. On March 15, voters approved Proposal A by 65% to 35%. The proposal shifted funding for schools from property taxes to sales taxes. The proposal raised the state's sales tax from 4% to 6% and increased the tax on cigarettes by 50 cents.
3. Jack Kevorkian and assisted suicide. On May 2, a jury acquitted Jack Kevorkian in connection with the death of Thomas Hyde who suffered from Lou Gehrig's disease. The trial was the first test of Michigan's assisted suicide law, adopted by the Legislature to stop Kevorkian from continuing his efforts to assist terminally ill patients to end their lives. After the verdict, Kevorkian told reporters: "I'm prosecutable. I'm just not convictable." Days later, on May 10, a Michigan appellate court issued separate rulings that (i) persons assisting suicide could be prosecuted for murder, and (ii) Michigan's assisted suicide law was technically invalid but that a revised ban would be constitutional.
4. Growth in the Michigan economy.
5. Charter schools. A judge ruled charter schools unconstitutional, and the Legislature then acted to authorize and fund them.
6. Booming auto sales.
7. Deep winter freeze. Severe cold weather struck the state in January.
8. Detroit prison break. On August 21, 10 prisoners escaped from the Ryan Regional Correctional Facility in Detroit. Nine of the escapees were captured. The tenth was found dead.
9. Day-care/child custody decision. On July 8, a 69-year-old Macomb County judge ordered that custody of three-year-old Maranda Ireland-Smith be removed from her 19-year-old mother and instead be awarded to the father. The judge found that the mother's use of commercial day care while attending classes at the University of Michigan was not in the child's best interest, whereas the father's mother was willing to care for the child full time. The decision drew national attention and criticism from working parents. The New York Times wrote that the order was "an affront and threat to the millions of women for whom day care is the difference between ignorance and an education, poverty and a decent income, dependency and self-reliance." The decision was reversed on appeal in 1995.
10. Deckerville child abuse trial. Stephen Rogers of Deckerville and his live-in girlfriend, Trudy O'Connor, were convicted of first-degree child abuse after Rogers' nine-year-old daughter was found by police in February 1994 chained to urine-soaked bed in dark closet. Rogers was sentenced to 10–15 years in prison, and O'Connor was sentenced to a six-to-15 year term.

In separate balloting by Michigan Associated Press newspapers and broadcast stations, the state's top sports stories were selected as follows:

1. Nancy Kerrigan assault. On January 6, an assailant hired by the ex-husband of Tonya Harding struck Nancy Kerrigan's right knee with a club as she walked through a corridor at Detroit's Cobo Arena following a practice session at the 1994 U.S. Figure Skating Championships. Kerrigan was treated for her injuries at Hutzel Hospital.
2. Firing of George Perles. On November 8, after the 1994 Michigan State Spartans football team began the season with nine losses and no wins, George Perles was fired as the team's head coach. He had been head coach for 12 years and was the second winningest coach in program history. Nick Saban was hired as his replacement on December 3.
3. Baseball strike. On September 14, the 1994–95 Major League Baseball strike began. The strike resulted in the cancellation of the final weeks of the season as well as the World Series.
4. World Cup in Michigan. The 1994 FIFA World Cup had several games played at the Pontiac Silverdome, including a 1–1 tie between USA and Switzerland.
5. Isiah Thomas. Isiah Thomas was offered a $55 million contract with the Pistons but took a post with Toronto instead.
6. Detroit Red Wings lost in first round of playoffs and Bryan Murray fired as GM.
7. The 1994–95 NHL lockout.
8. Grant Hill signed. The Pistons selected Grant Hill with the third overall pick in the 1994 NBA draft.
9. The 1993 Michigan Wolverines football team, including Colorado's victory in the Miracle at Michigan.
10. Scott Mitchell signed. After losing Erik Kramer to free agency, the Detroit Lions on March 7 signed free agent quarterback Scott Mitchell to an $11 million contract, including a $5 million signing bonus.

== Office holders ==
=== State office holders ===
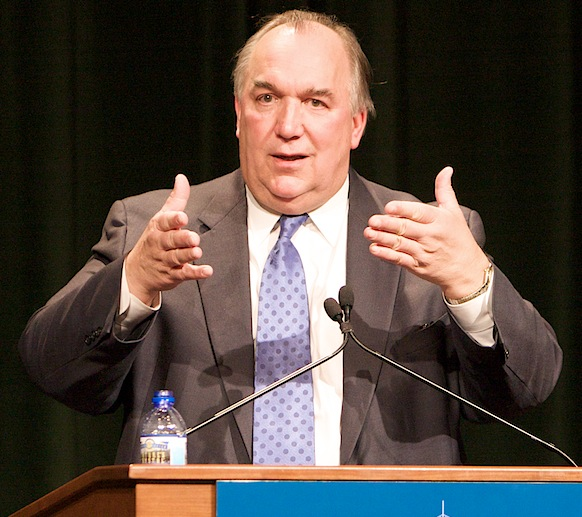
Gov. Engler

- Governor of Michigan: John Engler (Republican)
- Lieutenant Governor of Michigan: Connie Binsfeld (Republican)
- Michigan Attorney General: Frank J. Kelley (Democrat)
- Michigan Secretary of State: Richard H. Austin (Democrat)
- Speaker of the Michigan House of Representatives: Paul Hillegonds (Republican)
- Majority Leader of the Michigan Senate: Dick Posthumus (Republican)
- Chief Justice, Michigan Supreme Court: Michael Cavanagh

=== Mayors of major cities ===
- Mayor of Detroit: Dennis Archer
- Mayor of Grand Rapids: Gerald R. Helmholdt
- Mayor of Warren, Michigan: Ronald L. Bonkowski
- Mayor of Sterling Heights, Michigan: Richard J. Notte
- Mayor of Flint: Woodrow Stanley
- Mayor of Dearborn: Michael Guido
- Mayor of Lansing: Jim Crawford/David Hollister
- Mayor of Ann Arbor: Elizabeth Brater/Ingrid Sheldon
- Mayor of Saginaw: Gary L. Loster

=== Federal office holders ===
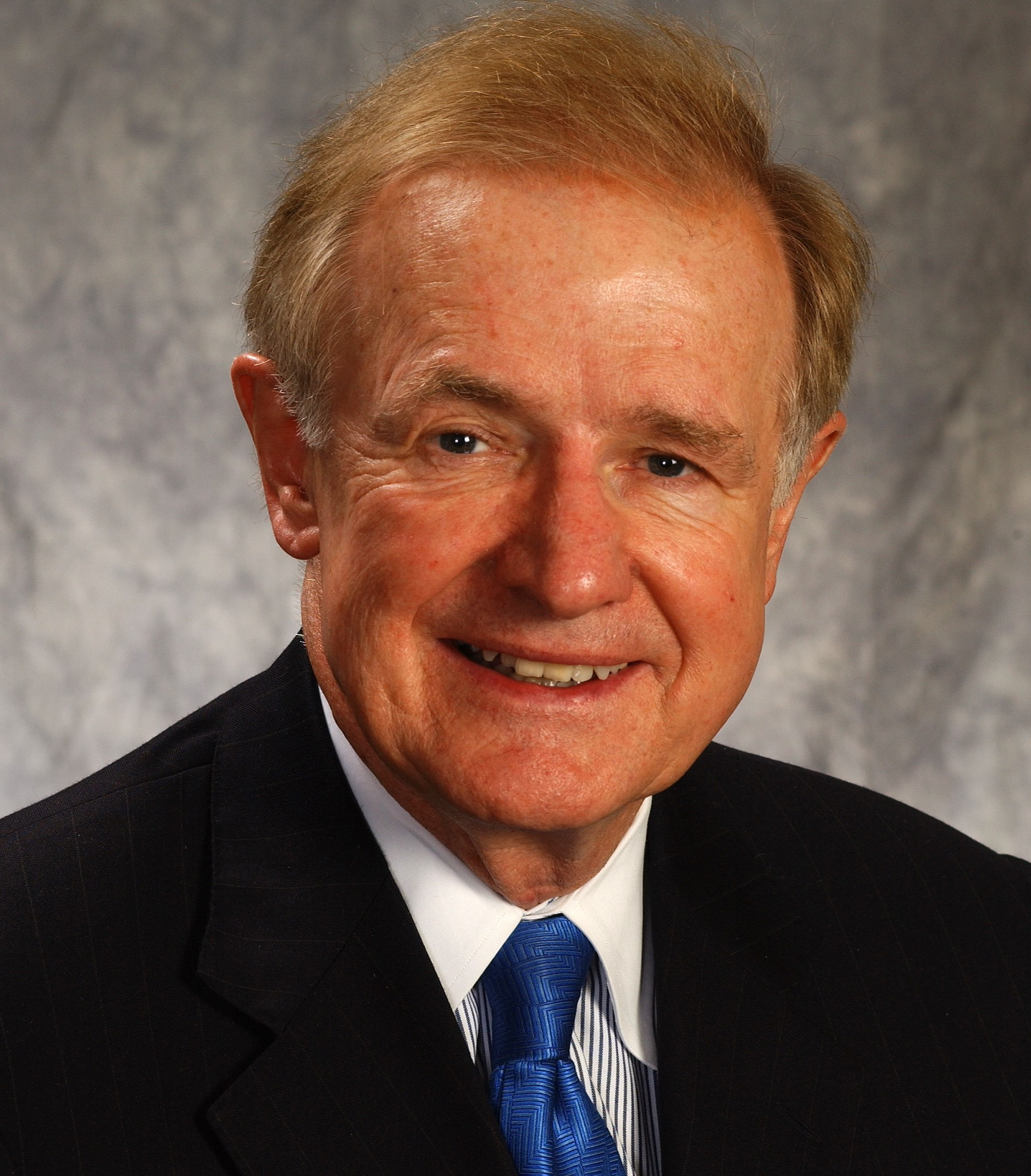
Sen. Riegle

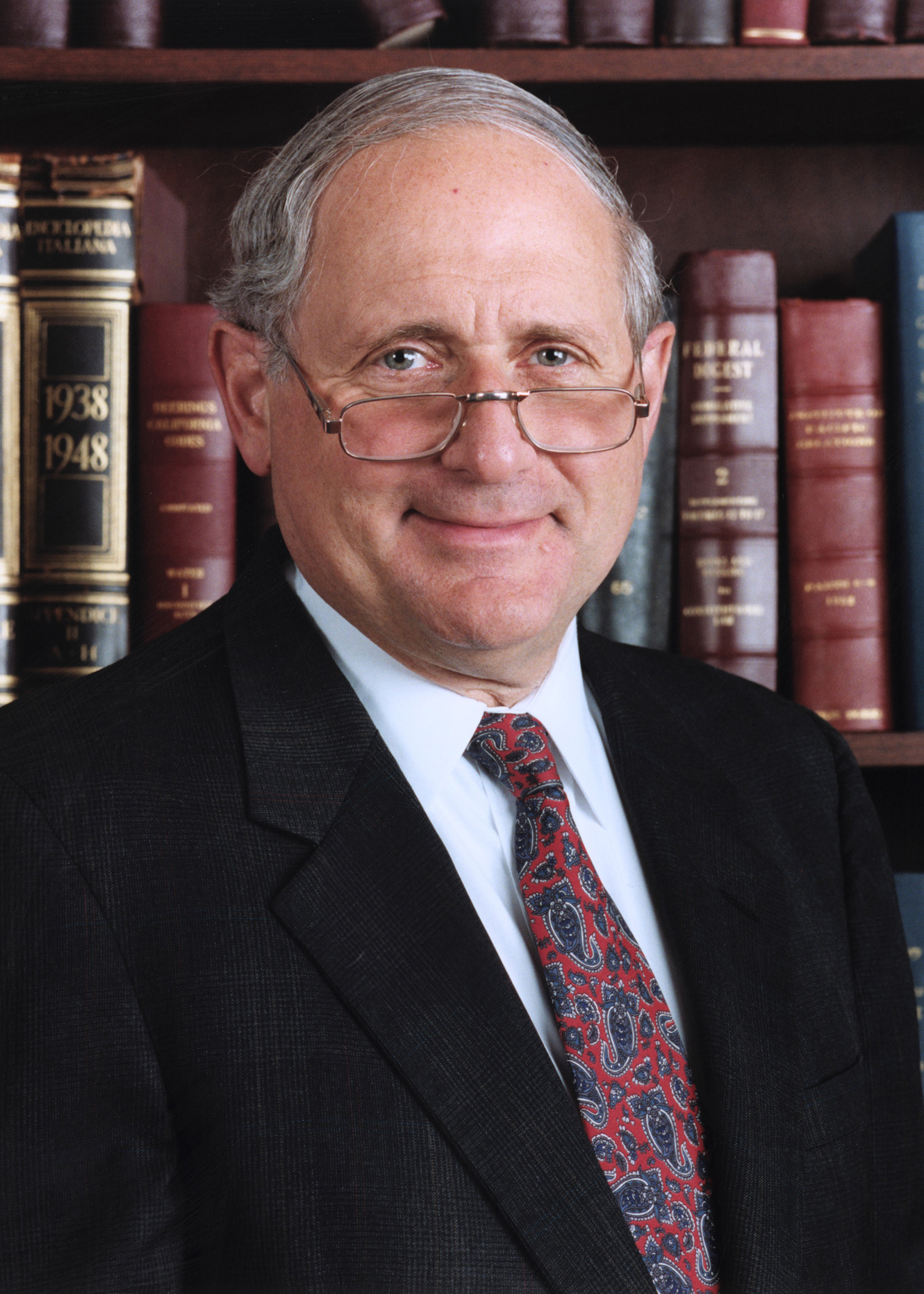
Sen. Levin

- U.S. Senator from Michigan: Donald Riegle (Democrat)
- U.S. Senator from Michigan: Carl Levin (Democrat)
- House District 1: Bart Stupak (Democrat)
- House District 2: Pete Hoekstra (Republican)
- House District 3: Vern Ehlers (Republican)
- House District 4: Dave Camp (Republican)
- House District 5: James A. Barcia (Democrat)
- House District 6: Fred Upton (Republican)
- House District 7: Nick Smith (Republican)
- House District 8: Milton Robert Carr (Democrat)
- House District 9: Dale Kildee (Democrat)
- House District 10: David Bonior (Democrat)
- House District 11: Joe Knollenberg (Republican)
- House District 12: Sander Levin (Democrat)
- House District 13: William D. Ford (Democrat)
- House District 14: John Conyers (Democrat)
- House District 15: Barbara-Rose Collins (Democrat)
- House District 16: John Dingell (Democrat)

== Population ==
In the 1990 United States census, Michigan was recorded as having a population of 9,295,29 persons, ranking as the eighth most populous state in the country. By 2000, the state's population had grown by 6.9% to 9,938,444 persons.

=== Cities ===
The following is a list of cities in Michigan with a population of at least 50,000 based on 1990 U.S. Census data. Historic census data from 1980 and 2000 is included to reflect trends in population increases or decreases. Cities that are part of the Detroit metropolitan area are shaded in tan.

1990 Rank	City	County	1980 Pop.	1990 Pop.	2000 Pop.	Change 1990-2000
1	Detroit	Wayne	1,203,368	1,027,974	951,270	−7.5% ▼
2	Grand Rapids	Kent	181,843	189,126	197,800	4.6% ▲
3	Warren	Macomb	161,134	144,864	138,247	−4.6% ▼
4	Flint	Genesee	159,611	140,761	124,943	−11.2% ▼
5	Lansing	Ingham	130,414	127,321	119,128	−6.4% ▼
6	Sterling Heights	Macomb	108,999	117,810	124,471	5.7% ▲
7	Ann Arbor	Washtenaw	107,969	109,592	114,024	4.0% ▲
8	Livonia	Wayne	104,814	100,850	100,545	−0.3% ▼
9	Dearborn	Wayne	90,660	89,286	97,775	9.5%▼
10	Westland	Wayne	84,603	84,724	86,602	2.2% ▲
11	Kalamazoo	Kalamazoo	79,722	80,277	76,145	−5.1% ▼
12	Southfield	Oakland	75,608	75,745	78,322	3.4% ▲
13	Farmington Hills	Oakland	58,056	74,611	82,111	10.1% ▲
14	Troy	Oakland	67,102	72,884	80,959	11.1% ▲
15	Pontiac	Oakland	76,715	71,166	66,337	−6.8% ▼
16	Taylor	Wayne	77,568	70,811	65,868	−7.0% ▼
17	Saginaw	Saginaw	77,508	69,512	61,799	−11.1% ▼
18	St. Clair Shores	Macomb	76,210	68,107	63,096	−7.4% ▼
19	Royal Oak	Oakland	70,893	65,410	60,062	−8.2% ▼
20	Wyoming	Kent	59,616	63,891	69,368	8.6% ▲
21	Dearborn Heights	Wayne	67,706	60,838	58,264	−4.2% ▼
22	Roseville	Wayne	54,311	51,412	48,129	−6.4% ▼
23	East Lansing	Ingham	51,392	50,677	46,525	−8.2% ▼

=== Counties ===
The following is a list of counties in Michigan with populations of at least 150,000 based on 1990 U.S. Census data. Historic census data from 1980 and 2000 are included to reflect trends in population increases or decreases. Counties that are part of the Detroit metropolitan area are shaded in tan.

1990 Rank	County	Largest city	1980 Pop.	1990 Pop.	2000 Pop.	Change 1900-2000
1	Wayne	Detroit	2,337,891	2,111,687	2,061,162	−2.4% ▼
2	Oakland	Pontiac	1,011,793	1,083,592	1,194,156	10.2% ▲
3	Macomb	Warren	694,600	717,400	788,149	9.9% ▲
4	Kent	Grand Rapids	444,506	500,631	574,335	14.7% ▲
5	Genesee	Flint	450,449	430,459	436,141	1.3% ▼
6	Washtenaw	Ann Arbor	264,748	282,937	322,895	14.1% ▲
7	Ingham	Lansing	275,520	281,912	279,320	−0.9% ▼
8	Kalamazoo	Kalamazoo	212,378	223,411	238,603	6.8% ▲
9	Saginaw	Saginaw	228,059	211,946	210,039	−0.9% ▼
10	Ottawa	Holland	157,174	187,768	238,314	26.9% ▲
11	Berrien	Benton Harbor	171,276	161,378	162,453	0.6% ▲
12	Muskegon	Muskegon	157,589	158,983	170,200	7.1% ▲
13	Jackson	Jackson	151,495	149,756	158,422	5.8% ▼

== Sports ==
=== Baseball ===
- 1994 Detroit Tigers season – Under manager Sparky Anderson, the Tigers compiled a 53–62 record and finished fifth in American League East. The team's statistical leaders included Junior Felix with a .306 batting average, Cecil Fielder with 28 home runs and 90 RBIs, Mike Moore with 11 wins, and Storm Davis with a 3.56 earned run average.

=== American football ===
- 1994 Detroit Lions season – Under head coach Wayne Fontes, the Lions compiled a 9–7 record and finished third in the NFC Central Division. The team's statistical leaders included Dave Krieg with 1,629 passing yards, Barry Sanders with 1,883 rushing yards, and Herman Moore with 1,173 receiving yards, and Jason Hanson with 93 points scored.
- 1994 Michigan Wolverines football team – Under head coach Gary Moeller, the Wolverines compiled an 8–4 record, finished third in the Big Ten Conference, defeated Colorado State in the 1994 Holiday Bowl, and were ranked No. 12 in the final AP poll. The team's statistical leaders included Todd Collins with 2,518 passing yards, Tyrone Wheatley with 1,144 rushing yards, Amani Toomer with 1,096 receiving yards, and Remy Hamilton with 101 points scored.
- 1994 Michigan State Spartans football team – Under head coach George Perles, the Spartans compiled a 5–6 record. The team's statistical leaders included Tony Banks with 2,040 passing yards, Duane Goulbourne with 930 rushing yards, Scott Greene with 452 receiving yards, and Chris Gardner with 72 points scored.

=== Basketball ===
- 1993–94 Detroit Pistons season – Under head coach Don Chaney, the Pistons compiled a 20–62 record and finished seventh in the NBA's Central Division. The team's statistical leaders included Terry Mills with 672 points, Isaiah Thomas with 399 assists and Dennis Rodman with 1,132 rebounds.

=== Ice hockey ===
- 1993–94 Detroit Red Wings season – Under head coach Scotty Bowman, the Red Wings compiled a 46–30–8 record, finished first in the NHL Norris Division, and lost in the Conference Quarter-Finals to the San Jose Sharks. Sergei Fedorov led the team with 56 goals, 64 assists, and 120 points. The team's goaltenders included Chris Osgood (41 games) and Tim Cheveldae (30 games).

== Music and culture ==
- March 15 - Madonna's single I'll Remember was released. It reached No. 2 on the Billboard Hot 100 and No. 1 on the US Adult Contemporary chart.
- October 25 - Madonna's album Bedtime Stories was released. It reached No. 3 on the US Billboard 200 album chart. With 2,531,000 units sold in the US (8 million worldwide), the album was certified as triple platinum.
- December 6 - Madonna's single Take a Bow was released. It reached No. 1 on the Billboard Hot 100 and the US Adult Contemporary chart.

== Chronology of events ==
=== December ===
- December 2 - The U.S. Department of Transportation agreed with General Motors to drop its investigation into GM pickup trucks in exchange for $51.4 million in funding for federal automobile safety programs.
- December 3 - Michigan State announced the hiring of Nick Saban as its new head football coach.
- December 10 - Albion College won the NCAA Division III national football championship, defeating Washington & Jefferson in the Amos Alonzo Stagg Bowl.
- December 11 - CBS changed its affiliate in Detroit from Channel 2 (WJBK) to Channel 62 (WGPR), causing confusion among viewers unable to find CBS programming. Channel 2 became a Fox affiliate.
- December 12 - Kmart Corporation announced the layoff of 900 employees at its corporate headquarters in Troy, Michigan. The terminated workers were escorted from the building by security personnel.
- December 13 - The Michigan Supreme Court ruled that the state's ban on suicide was constitutional, opening the way for possible prosecution of Jack Kevorkian in connection with 21 suicides he had attended since the law was enacted in June 1990.
- December 16 - Rick Rizzs and Frank Rathbun were not renewed as WJR's broadcast team for Detroit Tigers games. Frank Beckmann was announced as the new play-by-play announcer.
- December 20 - The federal government announced that Detroit had been selected as one of six sites for a $100-million empowerment zone.
- December 27 - Perry Drug Stores Inc., Michigan's largest drug store chain with its headquarters in Waterford Township, agreed to be acquired by Rite Aid Corp. for $132 million.
- December 31 - In a ceremony at the Governor's residence, John Engler was sworn in for his second term as governor.

== Births ==
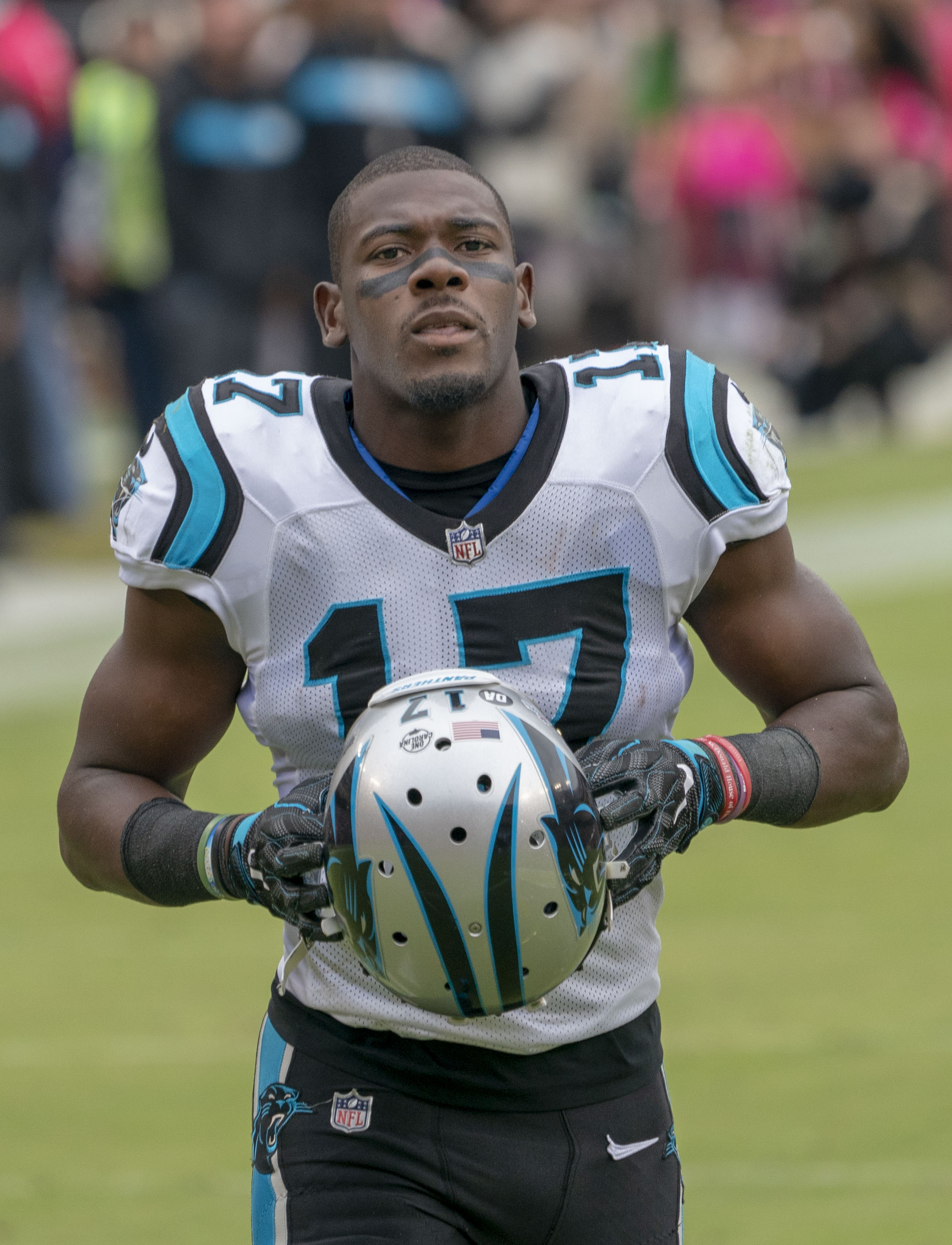
Devin Funchess

- January 11 - Bones, rapper, in Howell, Michigan
- January 17 - Aerial Powers, WNBA player, in Detroit
- January 20 - Abraham Aiyash, politician, in Hamtramck
- January 21 - Jake Cronenworth, MLB infielder, in St. Clair
- February 25 - Ondre Pipkins, defensive end, in Saginaw
- April 4 - Mallory Weber, soccer player, in Novi
- May 7 - Alexandra Aldridge, ice dancer, in Royal Oak
- May 12 - Xavier Prather, lawyer and reality television personality, in Kalamazoo
- May 21 - Devin Funchess, American football tight end at Michigan and in NFL, in Detroit
- June 8 - Allison Reed, ice dancer, in Kalamazoo
- August 4 - Shane Morris, quarterback
- August 5 - Cindy Sember, spring hurdler, in Ypsilanti
- August 15 - Anthony Clemmons, basketball, in Lansing
- August 17 - Jack Conklin, football tackle, in Plainwell
- August 17 - Annie Lazor, swimmer, in Detroit
- August 18 - Taylor Moton, football tackle, in Lansing
- August 19 - Andrew Wylie, football guard, in Hemlock
- September 26 - Eric Wilson, linebacker, in Redford
- November 14 - Adam Coon, wrestler, in Folwerville
- November 25 - 42 Dugg, rapper and songwriter, in Detroit
- December 10 - Kayli Mills, voice actress and YouTuber, in Michigan
- December 16 - Chanté Adams, actress, in Detroit
- December 31 - Taylor Hale, reality television personality and beauty pageant titleholder, in Detroit

== Deaths ==
- January 28 - Hal Smith, actor (Owl in the first four original Winnie the Pooh animated shorts, Otis Campbell on The Andy Griffith Show), at age 77 in Santa Monica, California
- March 28 - Ira Murchison, sprinter and gold medalist at the 1956 Summer Olympics, at age 61 in Harvey, Illinois
- May 8 - George Peppard, Detroit native and actor (Breakfast at Tiffany's, The A-Team), at age 65 in Los Angeles
- May 13 - John Swainson, Governor of Michigan (1961-1963), at age 68 in Manchester, Michigan
- July 13 - Charlie Fonville, world record setter in the shot put, at age 67 in Detroit
- July 16 - William Revelli, director of the Michigan Marching Band (1935-1971), at age 92 in Ann Arbor
- September 5- Hank Aguirre, pitcher for the Detroit Tigers (1958–67) and businessman, at age 63 in Bloomfield Hills, Michigan
- September 25 - Charles Van Riper, speech pathologist and pioneering expert on stuttering, at age 88
- November 4 - Fred "Sonic" Smith, guitarist, member of MC5, and husband of Patti Smith, at age 46 in Detroit
- November 28 - Dominic Jacobetti, longest serving Michigan state legislator, served in state house from 1955 to 1994, died in office at age 74 in Negaunee, Michigan
- December 5 - Dick Rifenburg, All-American football end at Michigan in 1948 who later played for the Detroit Lions, at age 68 in Cheektowaga, New York

=== Gallery of 1994 deaths ===
Hal Smith

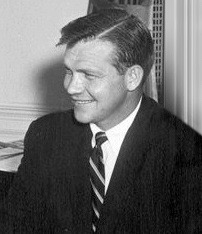
John Swainson

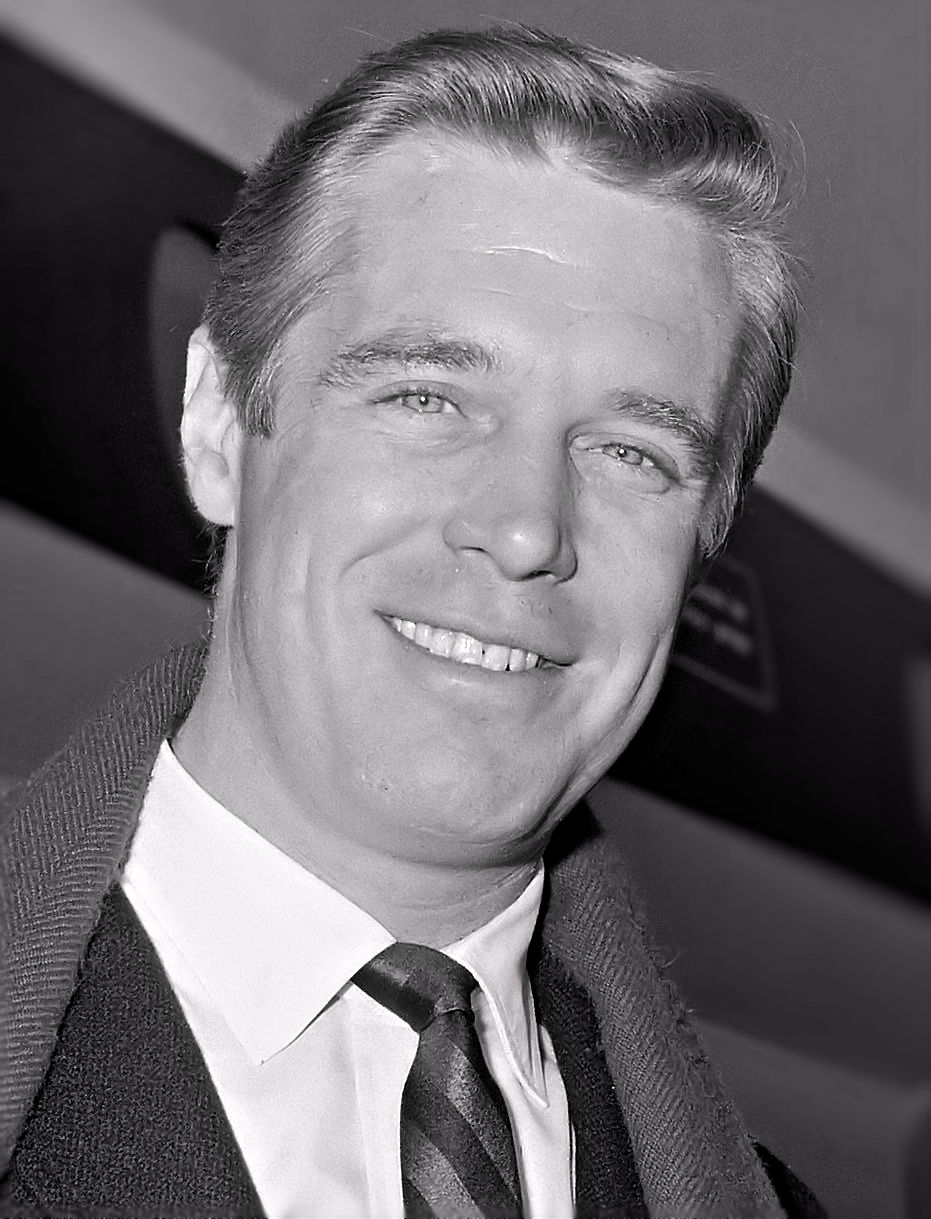
George Peppard

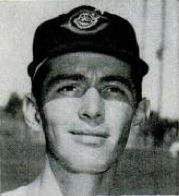
Hank Aguirre

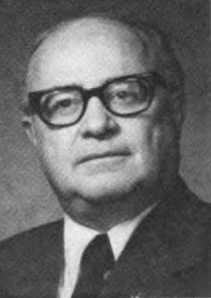
Dominic Jacobetti

== See also ==
- History of Michigan
- History of Detroit
