= Asa Kryst =

American soccer player

Personal information
- Date of birth: May 25, 1993 (age 33)
- Place of birth: Jackson, Michigan, U.S.
- Height: 5 ft 8 in (1.73 m)
- Position: Forward

College career
Years	Team	Apps	(Gls)
2011–2015	South Carolina Gamecocks	67	(13)

Senior career*
Years	Team	Apps	(Gls)
2013	IMG Academy Bradenton	2	(0)
2015	SC United Bantams	9	(0)
2016	Charlotte Independence	1	(0)
- * Club domestic league appearances and goals as of September 30, 2016

Asa Kryst (born May 25, 1993, in Jackson, Michigan) is an American professional soccer player.

== Personal life ==
Kryst is the younger brother of American television presenter and beauty pageant titleholder Cheslie Kryst, who was crowned Miss USA 2019 and died on January 30, 2022, from apparent suicide.

== Career ==
=== College and amateur ===
Kryst played college soccer at the University of South Carolina from 2011 to 2015, including a red-shirted year in 2014.

While at college, Kryst also appeared for USL PDL clubs IMG Academy Bradenton and SC United Bantams.

=== Professional ===
Kryst signed with United Soccer League side Charlotte Independence on April 27, 2016.

Kryst signed with Australian National Premiere League side Bendigo City FC on May 20, 2017.
