= Imashiine =

ImaShiine
- Birth name: Terry Landers Jr.
- Also known as: ImaShiine - ImaShiine Beatz - IMS
- Born: January 25, 1993 (age 32); Detroit, Michigan, United States
- Genres: Hip hop; R&B; Trap
- Occupations: Record Producer; Sound Designer; Music Engineer; Graphic Designer
- Instruments: Korg Kronos; Steinberg Cubase; Propellerhead Reason
- Years active: 2009-present
- Website: www.imashiine.com

Terry Landers Jr. (born January 25, 1993), professionally known as ImaShiine, is an American record producer from Detroit, Michigan. ImaShiine Is best known for producing, hip hop R&B, and Trap instrumentals for independent music industry. He is also known for founding the musical software company ProSoundz..

== Early life ==
Terry Landers Jr. was born on January 25, 1993, in Detroit, Michigan. Terry was born with Albinism which limited the amount of activities he could participate in, One of which he started at the age of 13 was Music Producing. He first started off using Propellerhead Reason 3.0, and since then have taught himself how to organize, record, and produce music. In 2009 he started to sell his instrumentals professionally. In 2011 he joined an online community for musicians known as soundclick and started to make a name, and establishing his style of producing, hip hop. In 2013 he started an Electronic Business for producers and musicians to purchase software, drum kits, and sound libraries, called ProSoundz.

== Career ==
Since the opening of his business in 2013 ImaShiine has continued on his path to success in the field of music production by offering his services of creating beats, instrumentals and mixing services to artists, and producers online. He is said to be working with Artist Kirko Bangz on his debut album yet to be announced, as well as other ventures with producers such as D Rich, Shawty Redd, & Key Wane. Along with working with the most prominent producers in the Hip-hop and Rap genres, he also gets the support from other businesses, and musical software brands. He has released various projects dating back to 2012 where he released his first instrumental Mixtape Who Got Bars Vol.1 , and since then have release more music both commercial and non-commercial. While maintaining a following he has often showed support for his producer / artist fans by giving back free products & music that he has designed as a way of saying thanks for all the love and support they have shown him over the years.

== Discography ==
=== Mixtapes ===
List of mixtapes, with selected details
| Title | Album details |
|---|---|
| Who Got Bars? Vol.1 | Released: November 28, 2012; Label: Self-released; Formats: Digital download |
| Streets Affiliated | Released: September 7, 2013; Label: Self-released; Formats: Digital download |
| Legendary Music | Released: September 5, 2014; Label: Self-released; Formats: Digital download |

=== Commercial Releases ===
List of Instrumental Albums
| Title | Album details |
|---|---|
| Who Got Bars? (Instrumental Album) | Released: April 3, 2013; Label: Self-released; Formats: Digital download |
| Project-$ | Released: June 5, 2013; Label: Island Def Jam Digital Distribution; Formats: Digital download |
| The Motivation | Released: April 10, 2015; Label: Island Def Jam Digital Distribution; Formats: Digital download |

== Production Equipment and style ==
The production equipment he uses to compose hip hop and R&B beats. primarily consist of an Akai Advance Keyboard, Cubase, Reason 8, Native Instruments (Kontakt, Maschine Mikro) and electronic keyboards manufactured by Korg. The signature style of ImaShiine's beats is a male voice saying "Imashiine". a Female voice saying "Imashiine Dot Com", or "This Is Imashiine". The style of his beats normally have crisp snares, with Low Punchy Kicks, and a Sub Bass, or Live drumming simulations with real cymbals, and hihats.

== Influences ==
ImaShiine stated his influences comes from a variety of well-known musicians such as Drumma Boy, Shawty Redd, Just Blaze, T.I., and Young Jeezy.
