= Mark Steenbergh =

American politician from Michigan

7th Mayor of Warren, Michigan
- In office November 7, 1995 – November 9, 2007
- Preceded by: Ronald L. Bonkowski
- Succeeded by: James R. Fouts

Macomb County Commissioner
- In office November 3, 1992 – November 6, 1995

Personal details
- Born: January 12, 1955 (age 71) Warren, Michigan, U.S.
- Party: Democratic
- Profession: Mayor (Retired)

Mark Steenbergh (born January 12, 1955) is an American politician from Michigan. Following a stint on the Macomb County Board of Commissioners, Steenbergh served as mayor of Warren, Michigan.

He was elected to his second and third term after being charged with a single count of racial intimidation and another count of misdemeanor assault in 1996. The charges result from an altercation with an African American named John Harris. Steenbergh was released on $25,000 personal bond.

Steenbergh was recognized for his service in an addition to the Congressional record in 2000 by Representative Sander M. Levin.

In 2005, a former firefighter sued Steenbergh and his Deputy Mayor, Mike Greiner, for defamation. The firefighter stipulated that he had been falsely accused of collecting pay while out of state.

During his final term as Warren mayor his daughter was arrested in a traffic stop. Shortly before leaving office in 2007 he spoke out against Iraqi immigrants moving to Warren. In 2007 Warren still limited Mayors to three terms.

He was a Macomb County public works official until he was fired by Candice Miller in 2017.
