= Gary L. Loster =

American politician

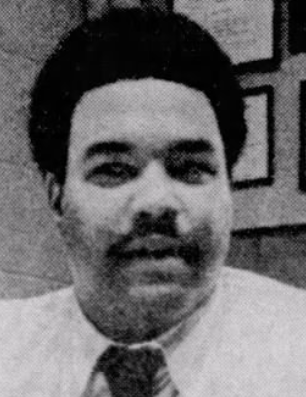

Mayor of Saginaw, Michigan
- In office November 8, 1993 – November 12, 2001
- Preceded by: Henry H. Nickleberry
- Succeeded by: Wilmer Jones Ham

City Council of Saginaw, Michigan

Personal details
- Born: Gary L. Loster; 1945 or 1946 (age 79–80)
- Party: Democratic
- Spouse: Allene Lostor
- Occupation: Businessman

Gary L. Loster (born 1945/1946) is an American politician who served as the fourth African-American mayor of Saginaw, Michigan and the first mayor to serve four terms.

== Biography ==
He earned a B.A. in Criminal Justice from Saginaw Valley State University and a M.A., with honors, in Applied Science from Michigan State University. Lostor serve in the U.S. Marine Corps during the Vietnam War. He was employed as a police officer with the Buena Vista Charter Township, Michigan Police Department eventually becoming the Chief of Police. He then went to the private sector working as Director of Fire Safety & Security for Delphi Saginaw Steering Systems, a subsidiary of General Motors. On November 8, 1993, he was elected as mayor of the city of Saginaw succeeding Henry H. Nickleberry. He was re-elected three more times, the first mayor to serve 4 terms since the 1936 charter. One of his early focuses was to overhaul the police department after complaints from residents over lack of service and racism after two white officers were relieved of duty for abusing a Black teenager. He also established a gang task force and promoted the use of prisoner work crews to clean the city.

Lostor served as mayor when the City Council was majority-Black and with its white minority often in opposition.

in 1996, he was criticized for taking a trip to Nigeria with a group of Michigan mayors (Linsey Porter of Highland Park, Walter Moore of Pontiac, Robert Warren of Muskegon Heights, and Sondra Mose Ursery of Vandalia) despite its dismal human rights record.

In 1999, he protested the shipment of plutonium that was to pass through Saginaw on its way to Canada.

In 1999, he was named as the president of the World Conference of Mayors. a 6,000-member organization based in Tuskegee, Alabama dedicated to fighting the AIDS epidemic and promoting debt relief for third-world countries.

== Personal life ==
He is married to Allene Lostor.
