= David Hollister =

American politician (1942–2026)

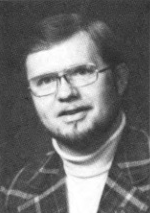
- Hollister in 1977

49th Mayor of Lansing
- In office 1994–2003
- Preceded by: Jim Crawford
- Succeeded by: Antonio Benavides

Member of the Michigan House of Representatives
- In office January 1, 1975 – 1993
- Preceded by: Earl E. Nelson
- Succeeded by: Lynne Martinez
- Constituency: 57th district (1975-1992); 69th district (1993)

Member of the Ingham County Board of Commissioners
- In office 1969–1974

Personal details
- Born: April 3, 1942 Kalamazoo, Michigan, U.S.
- Died: September 22, 2026 (aged 84)

David Hollister (April 3, 1942 – September 22, 2026) was an American politician who served as the mayor of Lansing, Michigan, from 1993 to 2003, until he resigned to be the director of the Michigan Department of Labor and Economic Growth under Michigan Governor Jennifer Granholm's administration.

== Life and career ==
=== Early life ===
Hollister was born in Kalamazoo and raised in Battle Creek, Michigan, where he graduated from Battle Creek Central High School. He earned bachelor's and master's degrees from Michigan State University.

=== Career ===
From 1967 to 1970 he was a social studies teacher at Lansing Eastern High School. Prior to becoming mayor, he served in the Michigan House of Representatives from 1973-1993 representing the City of Lansing. In 2005 he was recruited to run Prima Civitas, an economic development organization funded by Michigan State University and the city governments of Lansing and East Lansing, Michigan.

=== Mayor ===
During his tenure as mayor, he was instrumental in convincing General Motors Corporation to build the Grand River Assembly Plant downtown, and to build a new plant in the region to replace the Lansing Car Assembly Plant which dated back to 1903. Also under his tenure came the completion of Cooley Law School Stadium, the stadium for the Lansing Lugnuts, a Class A minor league baseball team. Hollister made central city (including downtown and Old Town) revitalization a top priority of his administration.

=== Later life and death ===
Lansing city hall was renamed the David C. Hollister City Hall in August 2017. The name will be retained when Lansing's new city hall is completed.

Hollister was diagnosed with Parkinson's in 2000. He died on September 22, 2026, at the age of 84.

== Works ==
- Hollister, David; Tadgerson, Ray; Closs, David; Hult, G. Tomas M. (2016). Second Shift: The Inside Story of the Keep GM Movement. McGraw Hill.
