= Ronald L. Bonkowski =

American politician from Michigan

6th Mayor of Warren, Michigan
- In office November 6, 1985 – November 7, 1995
- Preceded by: James R. Randlett
- Succeeded by: Mark Steenbergh

Personal details
- Born: Ronald Lawrence Bonkowski; June 6, 1938 Detroit, Michigan, U.S.
- Died: October 6, 2000 (aged 62) Warren, Michigan, U.S.
- Party: Democratic
- Profession: Mayor (Retired)

Ronald Lawrence Bonkowski (June 6, 1938 – October 6, 2000) was an American politician from Michigan. He was Mayor of Warren, Michigan From November 1985 to November 6, 1995. He was the second longest serving mayor of Warren since Warren became a city.

== Biography ==
Bonkowski was born in Detroit, Michigan. He was the son of Lawrence and Estelle (Nowakowski) Bonkowski. He was a student at the Walsh Institute of Accounting (the predecessor of Walsh College) until 1958. He earned a Bachelor of Business Administration from the University of Detroit (now the University of Detroit Mercy) in 1969, and participated in Postgraduate studies at Michigan State University.

He also served as Warren's Councilman from 1969 to 1970 and from 1979 to 1985. He was on the Macomb County Commission in 1971. He had also been secretary, and chairman of the Warren Board Appeals, chairman of the Warren Building Committee. He was also treasurer for the Macomb Community College Board of Trustees from 1977 to 1979, and on the board of directors for the Bi-County Hospital. He served in the United States Army from 1958 to 1960. He was a Member Veterans of Foreign Wars (Polish Legion) and the American-Polish Century Club of Alhambra.

His wife Christine Bonkowski served as a trustee at Macomb Community College. He died of an aneurysm and he had severe back pain. He died on October 6, 2000, in Warren, Michigan
