= 1998 in Michigan =

- Decades: 1970s; 1980s; 1990s; 2000s; 2010s
- See also: History of Michigan; Historical outline of Michigan; List of years in Michigan; 1998 in the United States

This article reviews 1998 in Michigan, including the state's office holders, performance of sports teams, a chronology of the state's top news and sports stories, and notable Michigan-related births and deaths.

== Top stories ==
Readers of the Detroit Free Press ranked the top 10 Michigan news stories of 1998 as follows:

1. The 1997–98 Detroit Red Wings won the club's second consecutive Stanley Cup championship, sweeping the Washington Capitols in the 1998 Stanley Cup Finals.
2. The October 24 demolition of the 87-year-old, 25-story J.L. Hudson building in Detroit.
3. The 1997 Michigan Wolverines football team's 21–16 victory over Washington State in the 1998 Rose Bowl, capping an undefeated season and national championship.
4. Chrysler's merger with German auto manufacturer Daimler-Benz.
5. A sex scandal in Grosse Pointe involving high school seniors having sex with underage girls as young as 14 at drinking parties, leading to criminal prosecutions and a CBS 48 Hours episode focusing on the scandal.
6. Right to die advocate Jack Kevorkian on September 17 administered a lethal injection to Thomas Youk, a 42-year-old Waterford Township man in the final stages of ALS. Kevorkian videotaped the voluntary euthanasia and delivered the tape to 60 Minutes which aired it on November 21. Kevorkian was charged with first-degree murder on November 25 and was ultimately convicted by a jury in 1999 of second-degree murder and sentenced to 10–15 years in prison.
7. Strikes at parts plants in Flint caused a 54-day shutdown of General Motors and a loss of $2.8 billion.
8. The surprise selection of Geoffrey Fieger as the Democratic candidate for governor and his loss to John Engler by a 62–38 margin, despite Fieger spending $5.7 million of his own money on the campaign.
9. Northwest Airlines pilots went on strike for 15 days from August 29 to September 13, causing travel disruption throughout the state.
10. Construction started on the temporary MGM Grand Detroit casino.

The newspaper's most frequently viewed item on its website was a story reported in late November and early December about a hunter, Mitch Rompola, killing a potential world-record deer with 12 points, a dressed weight of 263 pounds, and an antler spread of 38 inches. A follow-up story in late December reported on readers who believed that, based on the droopy ears on Rompola's buck, that his record-setting deer was a fake.

== Office holders ==
=== State office holders ===
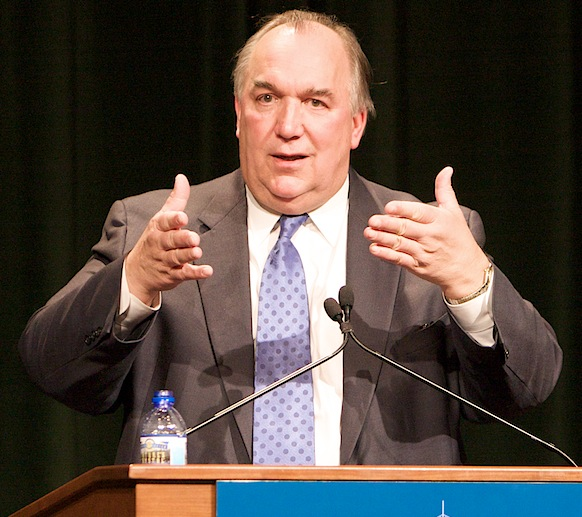
Gov. Engler

- Governor of Michigan: John Engler (Republican)
- Lieutenant Governor of Michigan: Connie Binsfeld (Republican)
- Michigan Attorney General: Frank J. Kelley (Democrat)
- Michigan Secretary of State: Candice Miller (Republican)
- Speaker of the Michigan House of Representatives: Curtis Hertel (Democrat)
- Majority Leader of the Michigan Senate: Dick Posthumus (Republican)
- Chief Justice, Michigan Supreme Court: Conrad L. Mallett Jr.

=== Mayors of major cities ===
- Mayor of Detroit: Dennis Archer
- Mayor of Grand Rapids: John H. Logie
- Mayor of Warren, Michigan: Mark Steenbergh
- Mayor of Flint: Woodrow Stanley
- Mayor of Lansing: David Hollister
- Mayor of Ann Arbor: Ingrid Sheldon (Republican)
- Mayor of Saginaw: Gary L. Loster

=== Federal office holders ===
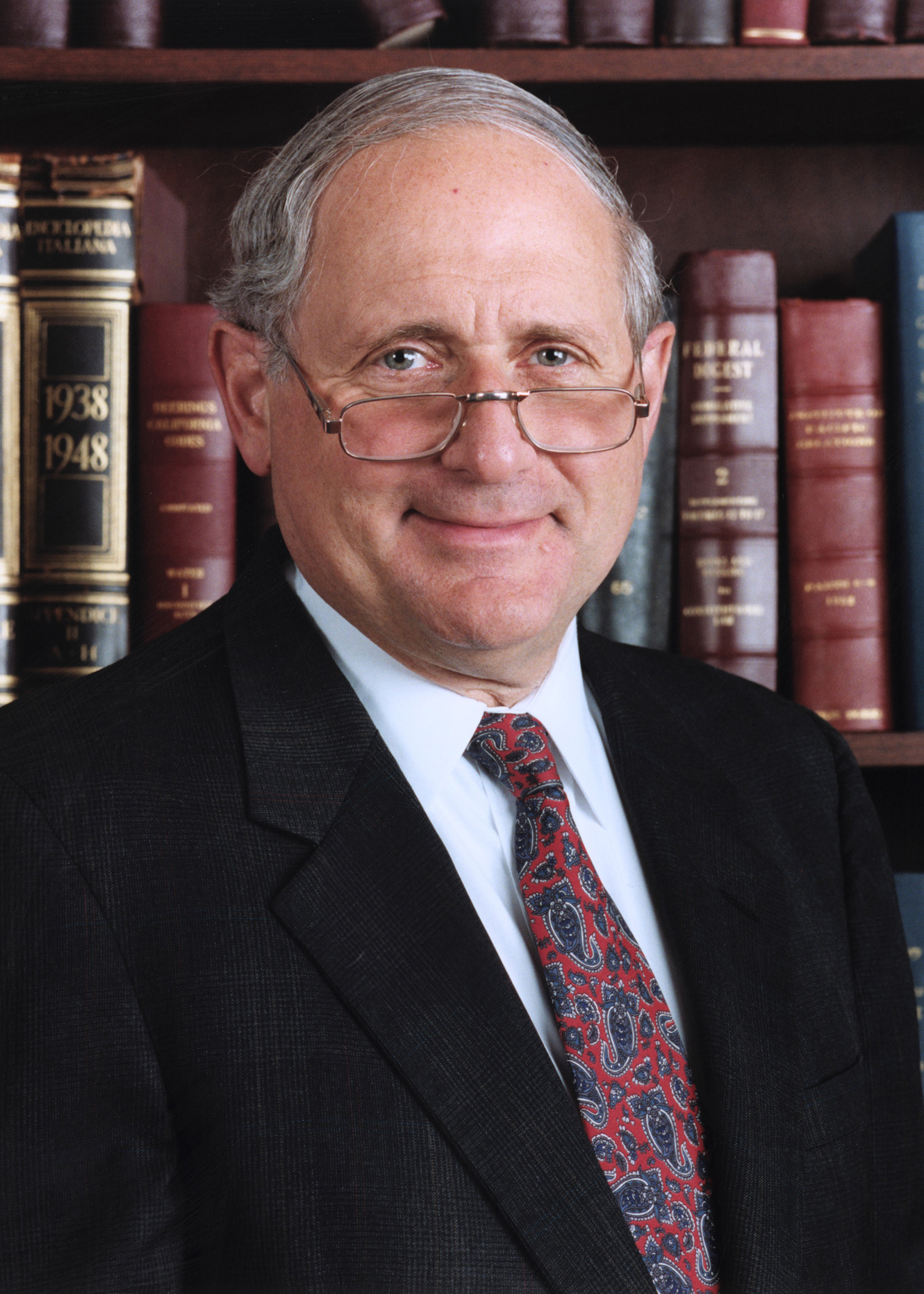
Sen. Levin

- U.S. senator from Michigan: Spencer Abraham (Republican)
- U.S. senator from Michigan: Carl Levin (Democrat)
- House District 1: Bart Stupak (Democrat)
- House District 2: Pete Hoekstra (Republican)
- House District 3: Vern Ehlers (Republican)
- House District 4: Dave Camp (Republican)
- House District 5: James A. Barcia (Democrat)
- House District 6: Fred Upton (Republican)
- House District 7: Nick Smith (Republican)
- House District 8: Debbie Stabenow (Democrat)
- House District 9: Dale Kildee (Democrat)
- House District 10: David Bonior (Democrat)
- House District 11: Joe Knollenberg (Republican)
- House District 12: Sander Levin (Democrat)
- House District 13: Lynn N. Rivers (Democrat)
- House District 14: John Conyers (Democrat)
- House District 15: Carolyn Cheeks Kilpatrick (Democrat)
- House District 16: John Dingell (Democrat)

== Sports ==
=== Baseball ===
- 1997 Detroit Tigers season - Led by managers Buddy Bell (first 137 games) and Larry Parrish (last 25 games), the Tigers compiled a 65–98 record and finished last in the AL Central. The individual leaders included Tony Clark (34 home runs, 103 RBIs, .291 batting average), Brian Hunter (42 stolen bases), Brian Moehler (14–13 record), Doug Brocail (2.73 earned run average), and Justin Thompson (149 strikeouts).

=== American football ===
- 1998 Detroit Lions season - In their second year under head coach Bobby Ross, the Lions compiled a 5–11 record and finished fourth in the NFC Central. The team's statistical leaders included Charlie Batch (2,178 passing yards), Barry Sanders (1,491 rushing yards), Johnnie Morton (1,028 receiving yards), and Jason Hanson (114 points scored).
- 1998 Michigan Wolverines football team - In their fourth season under head coach Lloyd Carr, the Wolverines compiled a 1–3 record, tied for the Big Ten championship, defeated Arkansas in the 1999 Florida Citrus Bowl, and were ranked No. 12 in the final AP and coaches polls. The team's statistical leaders included Tom Brady (2,427 passing yards), Anthony Thomas (761 rushing yards), and Tai Streets (906 receiving yards).
- 1998 Michigan State Spartans football team - In their fourth season under head coach Nick Saban, the Spartans compiled a 6–6 record.

=== Basketball ===
- 1997–98 Detroit Pistons season - Led by head coaches Doug Collins (first 45 games) and Alvin Gentry (last 37 games), the Pistons compiled a 37–45 record. The team's statistical leaders included Grant Hill (1,712 points, 551 assists) and Bison Dele (695 rebounds).
- 1998 Detroit Shock season - The Shock compiled a 17–13 record. The team's statistical leaders included Sandy Brondello (426 points, 98 assists) and Cindy Brown (301 rebounds).
- 1997–98 Michigan Wolverines men's basketball team - In their first season under head coach Brian Ellerbe, the Wolverines compiled a 25–9 record (all wins later vacated), won the Big Ten tournament (later vacated), and advanced to the Round of 32. The team's statistical leaders included Louis Bullock (580 points), Travis Conlan (131 assists), and Robert Traylor (344 rebounds, 46 blocks)
- 1997–98 Michigan State Spartans men's basketball team - In their third season under Tom Izzo, the Spartans compiled a 22–8 record and advanced to the Sweet Sixteen, losing to No. 1 North Carolina. The team's statistical leaders included Mateen Cleaves (484 points, 217 assists, 117 turnovers) and Antonio Smith (262 rebounds).

=== Ice hockey ===
- 1997–98 Detroit Red Wings season - Led by coach Scotty Bowman, the Red Wings compiled a 44–23–15 record and won the Stanley Cup championship, defeating the Washington Capitols in the finals. The team's statistical leaders included Brendan Shanahan (28 goals), Steve Yzerman (45 assists, 69 points), and Chris Osgood (33 wins in goal).
- 1997–98 Michigan Wolverines men's ice hockey season - In their 14th season under head coach Red Berenson, the Wolverines compiled a 34–11–1 record and won the NCAA national championship, defeating Boston College in the finals of the Frozen Four. Right wing Bill Muckalt led the team with 32 goals, 35 assists, and 67 points. Goalie Marty Turco had 34 wins in goal and a 2.16 goals allowed average.

=== Auto racing ===
- 1998 ITT Automotive Detroit Grand Prix - Championship Auto Racing Teams (CART) race on June 7 at the Raceway at Belle Isle Park in Detroit
- 1998 Miller Lite 400 - NASCAR Winston Cup race on June 14 at Michigan International Speedway
- 1998 Pepsi 400 presented by DeVilbiss - NASCAR Winston Cup race on August 16 at Michigan International Speedway

== Chronology of events ==
=== February ===
- February 5 - Michael Conat, age 16, shot and killed his sister Laura, age 12, at the family home in Rochester Hills. Conat's father was a Southfield police officer, and his mother was a teacher. Under a plea deal reached in May 2001, Conat admitted that he shot his sister. He was sentenced in August 2001 to 23–40 years in prison.

=== April ===
- April 4 - The Michigan Wolverines hockey team came from behind to defeat Boston College, 3–2, in the NCAA title game in Boston. It was the school's second national championship in three months, following the football team's success.
- April 13 - First Chicago NBD Corp of Chicago merged with Banc One, and the new owner decided to cese using the NBD name.
- April 15 - General Motors agreed to build its new engine plant in Flint in exchange for $107 million in incentives, or $153,000 in public money for eah of the 700 new jobs.
- April 20 - Gerald Atkins was found guilty by a jury in the 1996 Wixom Assembly Plant shooting.
- April 23 - General Motors agreed to purchase the Millender Center for $61.5 million.
- April 29 - Jack Tocco, mob boss of the Detroit Partnership, and three others were convicted for RICO violations. Tocco's brother, Anthony Tocco, was acquitted on all counts.

=== May ===
- May 6 - Chrysler and Daimler Benz announced they were in discussions for a $35-billion merger.
- May 11 - Detroit's new WNBA team, the Detroit Shock, introduced the team and its uniforms at an event called ShockFest.
- May 19 - The Detroit Symphony Orchestra led by Neeme Jarvi performed in Tallinn, Estonia. Jarvi, who emigrated from Estonia 20 years earlier, was greeted with prideful crowds in his home country.
- May 27 - Michigan Attorney General Frank J. Kelley, age 73, announced that he would not run for reelection. Kelley had served as Attorney General for 37 years.

=== June ===
- June 4 - Michigan resident Terry Nichols was sentenced to life in prison for his role in the Oklahoma City bombing plot.
- June 5 - Some 3,400 UAW workers at General Motors' Flint stamping plant went on strike. The strike continued until July 29, shutting down production nationwide, and ended up as the costliest strike in the company's history.
- June 6 - Detroit Grand Prix on Belle Isle
- June 7 - Jack Kevorkian offered for transplant two kidneys harvested from an assisted suicide patient.
- June 9 to 16 - The Detroit Red Wings swept the Washington Capitols in four games to win the Stanley Cup championship.
- June 17 - Six people were killed in the fire-bombing of a house on Detroit's west side. The fire bomb was thrown by a woman in a long-running dispute with one of the residents.
- June 18 - A million fans crowd downtown Detroit for the parade in honor of the Detroit Red Wings' second consecutive Stanley Cup championship.
- June 19 - General Motors closed two more assembly plants due to the UAW strike in Flint, bringing the total workers laid off to 115,000.
- June 26 - "Out of Sight", the first "mostly-made-in-Detroit" film to be released by a major studio since 1992, opened in theaters.

=== July ===
- July 3 - The Michigan legislature passed a ban on assisted suicide set to come into effect on September 1.
- July 8 - Dow Corning agreed to pay $3.2 billion to settle lengthy litigation over the safety of the company's silicone breast implants.
- July 12 - Miss Budweiser won the ABPA Gold Cup hydroplane final on the Detroit River with an average speed of 140.3 miles per hour. It was the 12th Gold Cup victory for Miss Budweiser. Miss Chrysler Jeep finished second.
- July 13 - After a three-day preliminary examination, a judge in the Grosse Pointe sex scandal ordered four young Grosse Pointe men to stand trial on charges that they raped three 14-year-old Grosse Pointe North High School freshmen at two Grose Pointe Woods homes during the Christmas break.
- July 14 - Detroit mayor Dennis Archer appointed Benny Napoleon as Detroit police chief.
- July 23 - Nathan Hanna, a disgruntled employee of the Sault Ste. Marie Evening News shot and killed the papers's circulation director Anthony Gillespie with a pump-action shotgun.
- July 26 - A wheel came loose from Adrian Fernandez's race car during the U.S. 500 race at Michigan International Speedway, flying into the grandstand where three people were killed and six others injured. The wheel initially landed in the lower rows of the grandstand, and then bounded upward to the top rows where it struck additional spectators.
- July 28 - UAW and General Motors reached an agreement to end a strike at two parts plants in Flint (Flint Delphi East and Flint Metal Center). The strike shut down GM production and was the costliest the company's history, resulting in an estimated $2.5 billion loss.
- July 31 - A Carson City, Nevada, court entered a $153.2 million judgment against Ford Motor Co. on behalf of a family whose three-year-old son was killed when a truck rolled over him due to a defective parking brake. It was the second largest judgment ever entered against an automaker in the United States.

=== August ===
- August 3 - General Motors announced it would spin off its Delphi parts subsidiary in 1999.
- August 4 - Trial lawyer Geoffrey Fieger won the Democratic gubernatorial primary, defeating Larry Owen and Doug Ross in a close contest.
- August 14 - The renovated Michigan Stadium was opened to the press. With 5,500 additional seats and a capacity of approximately 108,000 seats, the stadium was again the biggest in the country.
- August 15 - Woodward Dream Cruise

=== September ===
- August 27 to September 12 - Northwest Airlines pilots strike resulted in layoffs of 27,500 employees including 6,500 in Detroit. The strike was estimated to cost Michigan $323 million.
- September 1- Buddy Bell fired as manager of the Detroit Tigers.
- September 11 - Ford announced that chairman Alex Trotman would retire January 1 with William Clay Ford Jr. taking over as chairman and Jacques Nasser becoming the president and CEO.
- September 17 - Daniel Granger, president of Grosse Pointe North High School's Class of 1998, agreed to a plea deal in the Grosse Pointe sex scandal. He pled guilty to a misdemeanor charge of conspiracy to contribute to the delinquency of a minor and would serve no prison time and would be kept off the state's sex offender registry. At a hearing on September 22, Granger admitted he had sex with three 14-year-old girls. A statutory rape charge was dismissed, and Granger agreed to spend 90 to 180 days in a detention center.
- September 18 - Chrysler and Daimler shareholders overwhelmingly approved the merger of the two companies.
- September 25 - Tom Monaghan, owner of Domino's Pizza, announced that he was selling the business to Bain Capital. The selling price was estimated at $1 billion. Monaghan said he would devote virtually all of his time and money to Catholic education and that he planned to "die broke".

=== October ===
- October 6 - Rick Wagner was appointed president and chief operating officer of General Motors.
- October 24 - The J.L. Hudson building, a 25-story Detroit landmark since 1911, was imploded with 2,728 pounds of explosives. The demolition was broadcast live on four Detroit television stations 2, 4, 7 and 50, and 20,000 spectators watched live.

=== November ===
- November 1 - Four family members were battered to death at the Hopson home in Holly Township.
- November 3 - Elections in Michigan

- 1998 Michigan gubernatorial election - Incumbent Republican John Engler received 1,883,005 votes (62.2%) to defeat Democratic challenger Geoffrey Fieger who received 1,143,574 votes (37.8%).
- 1998 Michigan Attorney General election - Democratic nominee Jennifer Granholm received 1,557,310 votes (52.09%) to defeat Republican John Smietanka who received 1,432,604 votes (47.91%).
- 1998 Michigan Secretary of State election - Incumbent Republican Candice Miller received 2,055,432 votes (67.68%), defeating Democratic challenger Mary Lou Parks who received 938,557 votes (30.91%).
- 1998 United States House of Representatives elections in Michigan - Democratic incumbents retained their ten seats, and Republican incumbents retained their six seats.
- Proposal B to legalize physician-assisted suicide lost by nearly a three-to-one margin failed by a margin of 2,116,154 (71.1%) to 859,381 (28.8%).

- November 22 - World War 3 (1998): World Championship Wrestling event at The Palace of Auburn Hills
- November 5 - Michigan State student Bradley McCue died after drinking 24 shots on his 21st birthday.
- November 7 - Michigan State upset No. Ohio State.
- November 8 - Final races held at Detroit Race Track, a horse racing facility for 49 years.
- November 12 - Chrysler stock stopped trading after a 73-year run, following the company's merger with Daimler-Benz.
- November 12 - Great Lakes Crossing opened in Auburn Hills with 37,800 visitors on opening day.
- November 12 - A national study reported that Detroit had the fourth worst traffic congestion in the country.
- November 17 - Daimler-Chrysler began operating as a merged company.
- November 21 - Videotape footage of Jack Kevorkian assisting the suicide of Thomas Youk was aired on national television on "60 Minutes". The video showed Kevorkian administering the lethal dose. He was charged with murder on November 25 for his role in Youk's death.
- November 29 - Privacky family murders: After a threat of eviction and having his car taken away for receiving a C on his report card, Seth Privacky shot and killed his brother, father, grandfather, mother, and sister's girlfriend at the Privacky home north of Muskegon. Privacky was convicted and later shot and killed during a 2010 escape attempt.

=== December ===
- December 6 - James P. Hoffa, son of Jimmy Hoffa, declared winner of election as president of the Teamster's.
- December 9 - Jack Kevorkian ordered to stand trial for murder in Thomas Youk's death.
- December 11 - An explosion in an Osseo, Hillsdale County fireworks factory, Independence Professional Fireworks, killed seven workers.
- December 21 - Comerica agreed to pay $66 million for naming rights to the Detroit Tigers' new stadium.
- December 27 - Six O'Steen children died in a house fire in Detroit.
- December 29 - 18 fishermen were rescued from a runaway ice flow in Lake St. Clair.
- December 31 - A sudden snow storm caused a 100-car chain-reaction accident on I-75 near Frederic, Michigan. One person was killed, 40 injured, and 100 stranded.

== Births ==
- February 28 - Cassius Winston, basketball player, in Detroit
- March 21 - Miles Bridges, basketball player, in Flint, Michigan
- July 28 - Isaiah Livers, basketball player, in Kalamazoo, Michigan
- August 16 - Quinn Nordin, placekicker, in Rockford, Michigan
- October 14 - James Piot, professional golfer, in Farmington Hills, Michigan
- November 22 - Taylor Flint, soccer player, in Troy, Michigan

== Deaths ==
- January 5 - Sonny Bono, singer, songwriter, actor, politician, and Detroit native, at age 62
- January 20 - Bobo Brazil, first black professional wrestler to be a marquee name in US, at age 73
- January 20 - Joe Stubbs, R&B/soul singer (The Falcons, The Contours, The Originals, 100 Proof (Aged in Soul)), at age 55
- February 2 - Roger L. Stevens, theatrical producer, founding Chairman of the Kennedy Center for Performing Arts (1961) and the National Endowment of the Arts (1965), at age 87
- February 12 - Gardner Ackley, economist, Chair of Council of Economic Advisors (1964–1968), at age 82
- February 15 - Fleming Williams, singer for The Hues Corporation, lead on "Rock the Boat", at age 54
- February 25 - Harlan Hatcher, President of University of Michigan (1951–1967), at age 99
- February 28 - Daniel Katz, expert in organizational psychology, at age 94
- March 6 - A. F. K. Organski, political science professor, founder of power transition theory, at age 74
- March 12 - Karrell Fox, magician, "Milky the Clown" on Detroit television, at age 70
- March 19 - Reuben Kelto, MVP of 1941 Michigan football team, at age 78
- April 4 - Marshall Fredericks, sculptor (The Spirit of Detroit, Fountain of Eternal Life), at age 90
- April 19 - J. C. Harrington, "father of historical archaeology in America", at age 96
- May 1 - Marjorie Lansing, political scientist and activist who developed and popularized the idea of a gender gap in voting, at age 82
- May 8 - Marianne Strengell, modern textile designer, Cranbrook faculty (1937–1962), at age 88
- May 13 - Oscar G. Johnson, Medal of Honor recipient for single-handedly protecting left flank of his company during offensive to break Germany's gothic line, at age 77
- June 20 - George Van Peursem, Speaker of Michigan House (1957–58), Chairman of Michigan Republican Party (1961–63), at age 85
- June 26 - John Malcolm Brinnin, poet and literary critic, at age 81
- June 27 - William Rea Keast, president of Wayne State University (1965–1971), at age 83
- July 6 - Semon "Bunkie" Knudsen, General Motors executive (1939–68), Ford President (1968–69), at age 85
- July 7 - Lenore Romney, First Lady of Michigan (1963–69), Republican nominee for US Senate (1970), at age 89
- July 27 - Bill Tuttle, Detroit Tigers outfielder (1952–57), campaigned for tobacco awareness after diagnosis with oral cancer, at age 69
- August 16 - Patricia Shontz, economist, columnist, businesswoman, at age 65
- August 17 - Robert B. Evans, chairman of American Motors (1966–1967), at age 92
- August 24 - Charles Diggs, US Congress (1955–1980), founder of Congressional Black Caucus, found guilty of fraud in payroll scheme, at age 75
- August 27 - Garry E. Brown, US Congress (1967–1979), at age 75
- September 8 - Walter Adams, economist and President of Michigan State University (1969–1970), at age 78
- September 15 - Fred Alderman, Michigan State sprinter won gold medal at 1928 Summer Olympics, at age 93
- September 17 - William Albright, composer, pianist, organist, director of U-M's electronic music studio, at age 53
- September 17 - Win Elliot, U-M goalie, sportscaster, and game show host, at age 83
- September 26 - Betty Carter, jazz singer, known for improvisational technique and scatting, at age 69
- September 27 - Doak Walker, Heisman Trophy (1948), Detroit Lions (1950–55), at age 71 of complications from paralysis caused by skiing accident
- October 2 - Gordon Young, organist and composer, at age 78
- October 4 - Chuck Walton, Detroit Lions guard (1967–1974), at age 57
- October 7 - Morris Hood Jr., Michigan House of Representatives (1971–1998), at age 64
- October 15 - Perry Bullard, Democratic Socialist politician, represented Ann Arbor in Michigan House of Representatives (1973–1992), at age 56
- October 27 - Fran Harris, first woman to broadcast news in Michigan (1943, WWJ radio) and first woman-run television show in Michigan (1946), produced first courtroom show ("Traffic Court"), Peabody Ward (1948), at age 89
- November 10 - Hal Newhouser, "Prince Hal", Detroit Tigers pitcher (1939–53), 2x AL MVP, Baseball Hall of Fame, at age 77
- November 12 - Robert E. Machol, systems engineer, at age 81
- December 18 - John Nichols, Oakland County Sheriff (1985–1998), Detroit Police Commissioner (1970–73), at age 80
- unknown date 1998 - Lillian Hatcher, riveter, union organizer

== See also ==
- 1998 in the United States
