= 2000 in Michigan =

- Decades: 1980s; 1990s; 2000s; 2010s; 2020s
- See also: History of Michigan; Historical outline of Michigan; List of years in Michigan; 2000 in the United States

This article reviews 2000 in Michigan, including the state's office holders, demographics, largest public companies, performance of sports teams, cultural events, a chronology of the state's top news and sports stories, and notable Michigan-related births and deaths.

== Top stories ==
The top stories in Michigan in 2000 included:

- The 2000 U.S. Census showing that the populations of several of the state's major cities declined with Detroit falling below one million population for the first time since the 1920 census and Flint dropping by 11.2% in the decade.
- The 2000 elections in Michigan, including Al Gore defeating George W. Bush in the state's presidential vote and Democrat Debbie Stabenow defeating incumbent Republican U.S. Senator Spencer Abraham
- The emergence of Detroit's Eminem as a major star with his albums The Slim Shady LP (1999) and The Marshall Mathers LP (2000)
- The deaths of notable Michigan-related persons, including hockey player/coach Sid Abel, third baseman Aurelio Rodríguez, politician Neil Staebler, and geneticist James V. Neel.

== Office holders ==
=== State office holders ===
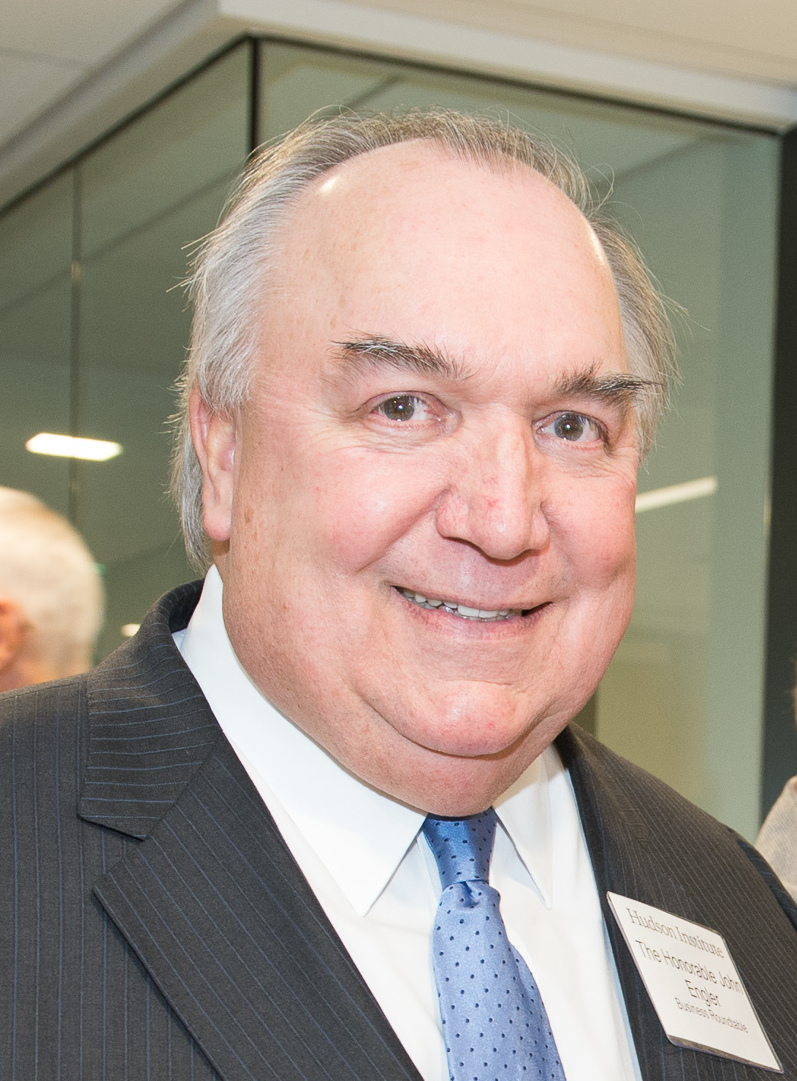
John Engler

- Governor of Michigan - John Engler (Republican)
- Lieutenant Governor of Michigan: Dick Posthumus (Republican)
- Michigan Attorney General - Jennifer Granholm (Democrat)
- Michigan Secretary of State - Terri Lynn Land (Republican)
- Speaker of the Michigan House of Representatives: Rick Johnson (Republican)
- Majority Leader of the Michigan Senate: Dan DeGrow (Republican)
- Chief Justice, Michigan Supreme Court: Elizabeth Weaver

=== Federal office holders ===
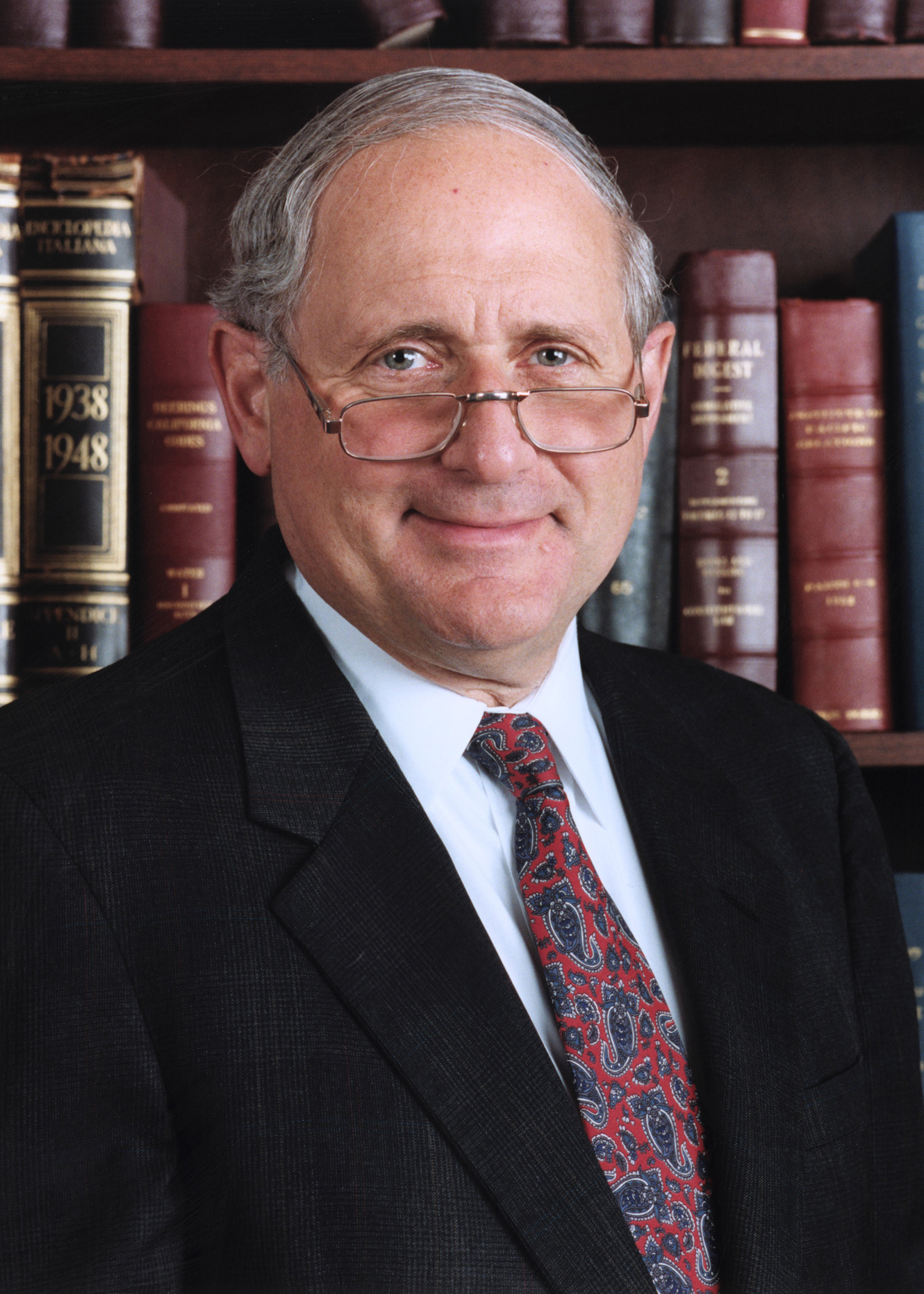
Carl Levin

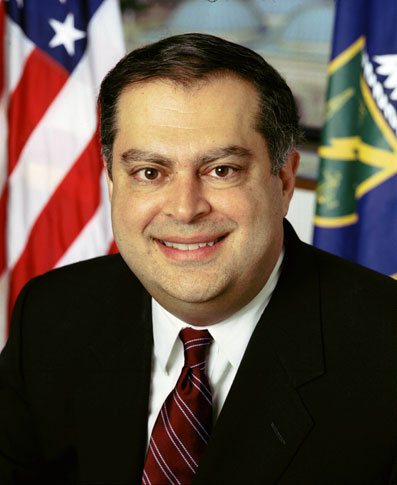
Spencer Abraham

- U.S. Senator from Michigan: Spencer Abraham (Republican])
- U.S. Senator from Michigan: Carl Levin (Democrat)
- House District 1: Bart Stupak (Democrat)
- House District 2: Pete Hoekstra (Republican)
- House District 3: Vern Ehlers (Republican)
- House District 4: Dave Camp (Republican)
- House District 5: James Barcia (Democrat)
- House District 6: Fred Upton (Republican)
- House District 7: Nick Smith (Republican)
- House District 8: Debbie Stabenow (Democrat)
- House District 9: Dale Kildee (Democrat)
- House District 10: David Bonior (Democrat)
- House District 11: Joe Knollenberg (Republican)
- House District 12: Sander Levin (Democrat)
- House District 13: Lynn N. Rivers (Democrat)
- House District 14: John Conyers (Democrat)
- House District 15: Carolyn Cheeks Kilpatrick (Democrat)
- House District 16: John Dingell (Democrat)

=== Mayors of major cities ===
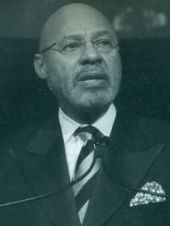
Dennis Archer

- Mayor of Detroit: Dennis Archer (Democrat)
- Mayor of Grand Rapids: John H. Logie
- Mayor of Ann Arbor: Ingrid Sheldon (Republican)
- Mayor of Lansing: David Hollister
- Mayor of Flint: Woodrow Stanley
- Mayor of Saginaw: Gary L. Loster (Democrat)

== Demographics ==
Michigan had a population as recorded in the 2000 U.S. Census of 9,938,444, an increase of 6.9% from the 1990 Census which recorded Michigan's population at 9,295,297.

The following is a list of 23 Michigan cities with populations over 50,000 based on 2000 U.S. Census data. Historic census data from 1990 and 2010 is included to reflect trends in population increases or decreases. Cities that are part of Metro Detroit are shaded in tan.

2000 Rank	City	County	1990 Pop.	2000 Pop.	2010 Pop.	Change 1990–2000
1	Detroit	Wayne	1,027,974	951,270	713,777	−7.5% ▼
2	Grand Rapids	Kent	189,126	197,800	188,036	4.6% ▲
3	Warren	Macomb	144,864	138,247	134,056	−4.6% ▼
4	Flint	Genesee	140,761	124,943	102,434	−11.2% ▼
5	Sterling Heights	Macomb	117,810	124,471	129,699	5.7% ▲
6	Lansing	Ingham	127,321	119,128	114,297	−6.4% ▼
7	Ann Arbor	Washtenaw	109,593	114,024	113,934	4.0% ▲
8	Livonia	Wayne	100,850	100,545	96,942	−0.3% ▼
9	Dearborn	Wayne	89,286	97,775	98,153	9.5%▲
10	Westland	Wayne	84,724	86,602	84,094	2.2% ▲
11	Farmington Hills	Oakland	74,611	82,111	79,740	10.1% ▲
12	Troy	Oakland	72,884	80,959	80,980	11.1% ▲
13	Southfield	Oakland	75,745	78,322	71,758	3.4% ▲
14	Kalamazoo	Kalamazoo	80,277	76,145	74,262	−5.1% ▼
15	Wyoming	Kent	63,891	69,368	72,125	8.6% ▲
16	Rochester Hills	Oakland	61,766	68,825	70,995	11.4% ▲
17	Pontiac	Oakland	71,166	66,337	59,515	−6.8% ▼
18	Taylor	Wayne	70,811	65,868	63,131	−7.0% ▼
19	St. Clair Shores	Macomb	68,107	63,096	59,715	−7.4% ▼
20	Saginaw	Saginaw	69,512	61,799	51,508	−11.1% ▼
21	Royal Oak	Oakland	65,410	60,062	57,236	−8.2%
22	Dearborn Heights	Wayne	60,838	58,264	57,774	−4.2% ▼
23	Battle Creek	Calhoun	53,540	53,364	52,347	−0.3% ▼

== Largest public companies ==
In April 2001, the Detroit Free Press released its second annual "The Free Press 50" list of the largest Michigan-based public companies based on 2000 revenues. The top 30 companies are shown below.

Rank	Company	Headquarters	Business	2000 revenue (in billions)	2000 profit (in billions)	Change from 1999
1	General Motors	Detroit	Autos	$184.632	4.452	-20%
2	Ford Motor Company	Dearborn	Autos	$170.064	$3.467	−52%
3	KMart Corp.	Troy	Retailer	$37.028	-$.244	-160%
4	Delphi Automotive Systems	Troy	Auto supplier	$29.139	$1.062	-1.94%
5	Dow Chemical Company	Midland	Chemicals	$21.87	$1.513	+13.67%
6	Visteon Corp.	Dearborn	Auto supplier	$19.467	$0.270	-63.27%
7	Lear Corporation	Southfield	Auto supplier	$14.072	$.274	+6.85%
8	Whirlpool Corporation	Benton Harbor	Appliances	$10.325	$.367	+5.76%
9	CMS Energy	Jackson	Utility	$8.998	-$.036	-86.62%
10	ArvinMeritor Inc.	Troy	Auto supplier	$7.700	$.254	-8.96%
11	Masco Corp.	Taylor	Building products	$7.243	$.591	+3.88%
12	Kellogg Co.	Battle Creek	Food	$6.954	$.587	+73.72%
13	Federal-Mogul Corp.	Southfield	Auto supplier	$6.013	-.281	-215%
14	DTE Energy	Detroit	Utility	$5.597	$.468	-3.11%
15	United Auto Group	Detroit	Auto francise operator	$4.883	$.030	+9.24%
16	Kelly Services	Troy	Temporary staffing	$4.487	$.087	+2.44%
17	Pulte Corp.	Bloomfield Hills	Home builders	$4.159	$0.188	+5.79%
18	Steelcase	Grand Rapids	Office furniture	$3.885	$.193	+5.16%
19	Spartan Stores	Grand Rapids	Grocery distribution	$3.342	$0.020	+18.62%
20	Borders Group	Ann Arbor	Books, music, video	$3.271	$.043	-51.72%
21	American Axle & Mfg	Detroit	Auto supplier	$3.069	$.129	+11.76%
22	MCN Energy Group	Detroit	Utility	$2.791	$0.108	+675.42%
23	SPX Corp.	Muskegon	Machinetools	$2.678	$0.189	+86.70%
24	Comerica	Detroit	Financial services	$2.448	$0.749	+11.34%
25	Stryker Corporation	Kalamazoo	Medical products	$2.289	$.221	+1,039.18%
26	La-Z-Boy Inc.	Monroe	Home furniture	$2.232	$0.087	+8.74%
27	Hayes Lemmerz Intl	Northville	Auto supplier	$2.171	-$0.041	-164.21%
28	Compuware	Farmington Hills	Computer software	$2.077	$0.119	-72.28%
29	Herman Miller	Zeeland	Office furniture	$1.938	$0.139	-1.48%
30	Champion Enterprises	Auburn Hills	Manufactured homes	$1.921	$0.147	-394.66%

== Sports ==
=== Baseball ===
- 2000 Detroit Tigers season - Led by Phil Garner, the Tigers compiled a 79–83 record. The team's statistical leaders included Bobby Higginson with 30 home runs and 102 RBIs.

=== American football ===
- 2000 Detroit Lions season - Led by head coach Matt Patricia until his firing after week 11, the Lions compiled a 5–11 record. The team's statistical leaders included Charlie Batch (2,489 passing yards) and James "Little Man" Stewart (1,184 rushing yards).
- 2000 Michigan Wolverines football team - In their sixth year under head coach Lloyd Carr, the Wolverines compiled a 9–3 record and tied for the Big Ten championship. The team's statistical leaders included quarterback Drew Henson with 1,852 passing yards, running back Anthony Thomas with 1,551 rushing yards and 102 points scored.
- 2000 Michigan State Spartans football team - Led by head coach Bobby Williams who took over after the departure of Nick Saban, the Spartans compiled a 5–6 record. The team's statistical leaders included Jeff Smoker (1,365 passing yards) and T. J. Duckett (1,353 rushing yards).

=== Basketball ===
- 1999–2000 Detroit Pistons season - Led by head coaches Alvin Gentry and then George Irvine, the Pistons compiled a 42–40 (.512) record. Key players included Grant Hill and Jerry Stackhouse.
- 2000 Detroit Shock season - The team compiled a 14–18 (.438) record.
- 1999–2000 Michigan State Spartans men's basketball team - In their fifth season under Tom Izzo, the Spartans compiled a 32–7 record and won the national championship, defeating Florida in the national championship game. Key players included Mateen Cleaves and Morris Peterson.
- 1999–2000 Michigan Wolverines men's basketball team - Led by Brian Ellerbe, the Wolverines compiled a 15–14 record.

=== Ice hockey ===
- 1999–2000 Detroit Red Wings season - Led by Scotty Bowman, the Red Wings compiled a 48–22–10–2 record, losing to Colorado in the Western Conference semifinals. The team's statistical leaders included Steve Yzerman (79 points), Brendan Shanahan (41 goals), and Nicklas Lidstrom (53 assists).
- 2000 CCHA men's ice hockey tournament - The tournament was held from March 10 to 18 at Joe Louis Arena in Detroit. Michigan State won the championship, and Michigan also advanced to the semifinals as one of the final four teams. Ryan Miller of Michigan State was selected as the tournament's MVP.

=== Other ===
- 2000 Tenneco Automotive Grand Prix of Detroit - The race was held on June 18, 2000, on the Raceway on Belle Isle in Detroit. It was won by Hélio Castroneves for Team Penske.
- 2000 Kmart 400
- 2000 Pepsi 400 presented by Meijer
- Mike Tyson vs. Andrew Golota - Billed as the "Showdown in Motown", it was a professional boxing match between Mike Tyson and Andrew Golota on October 20, 2000, at The Palace of Auburn Hills. Inititally a victory for Tyson, it as changed to no contest after Tyson was disqualified when he tested positive for marijuana in a post-fight test.

== Chronology of events ==
=== January ===
- January 1

- No. 8 Michigan defeated No. 5 Alabama, 35–34, in the Orange Bowl. Tom Brady completed 34 of 46 passes for 369 yards and four touchdowns.
- No. 9 Michigan State, led by Nick Saban, defeated No. 10 Florida, 37–34, in the Florida Citrus Bowl.

- January 17 - Bud, Not Buddy by Flint native Christopher Paul Curtis won both the Newbery Medal and the Coretta Scott King Award
- January 19 - In his State of the State speech, Gov. John Engler called for tax cuts.
- January 26

- Oak Park Police Sgt. Solomon Bell shot himself in the head while sitting at blackjack table in the high-roller area of the Motor City Casino. He had been on a losing streak and drew 20 in his final hand, only to lose when the dealer drew 21.
- DaimlerChrysler cochairman Robert James Eaton announced that he would retire in March. Eaton led the company's comeback in the 1990s and its sale to Daimler-Benz.
- Ford Motor announced a $6.9 billion proftis for 1997. It was the largest annual profit ever for any automaker.

- January 27 - Ford announced that workers would receive profit-sharing checks averageing $8,000.

=== February ===
- February 22 - In the Michigan Republican presidential primary, John McCain won with 646,744 votes (51%), defeating George W. Bush who received 547,939 votes (43%) and Alan Keyes with 58,790 votes (5%).

=== March ===
- March 11 - Al Gore won the Michigan Democratic presidential caucus with 82% of the votes.

=== November ===
- November 1 - Detroit and Ford Field were awarded hosting honors for Super Bowl XL in 2006.
- November 2 - State, county, and city government combine to offer Ford a $222 million incentive pacage to sepnd $2 billion to redevelop and expand its Rouge complex.
- November 5 - Al Gore visited Dearborn for a final election stop in Michigan.
- November 6 - Bobby Ross quit as head coach of the Detroit Lions; Gary Moeller hired to replace him.
- November 7 - Elections in Michigan

- 2000 United States presidential election in Michigan: Democrate Al Gore received 2,170,418 votes (51.28%), defeating Republican George W. Bush with 1,953,139 votes (46.14%).
- 2000 United States Senate election in Michigan: Democrat Debbie Stabenow received 2,061,952 votes (49.47%), in an upset victory over the incumbent Republican Spencer Abraham who received 1,994,693 votes (47.86%).
- 2010 United States House of Representatives elections in Michigan

- November 18 - Michigan defeated Ohio State in their annual rivalry game. It was Michigan's twelfth victory against only three defeats and one tie in the past 16 years.
- November 27 - Kirk Kerkorian filed a shareholder suit seeking to undo the merger of Daimler Benz and Chrysler. Kerkorian alleged that Daimler Chrysler Chairman Juergen Schrempp of "blatantly lying" to Chrysler shareholders that the deal was a "merger of equals."

=== December ===
- December 1 - Six children, ages 2 to 7, died in a fire in the Brewster-Douglass Housing Projects on the city' east side.
- December 12 - General Motors announced that it was phasing out its 103-year-old Oldsmobile brand, the oldest brand in the American automobile industry.
- December 28 - The Census Bureau released figures showing that, despite its strongest population growth since the 1960s, Michigan would lose a seat in Congress, as national population continued to shift from the Northeast and Midwest to the South and West. Michigan previously lost two seats in 1990 and one in 1980.

== Births ==
- January - Jasper Martus, politician, in Flushing
- January 20 - Ayo Akinola, soccer player, in Detroit
- February 1 - Alexa Spaanstra, soccer player, in Brighton
- February 23 - Natalie Viggiano, soccer player, in Troy
- March 5 - Gabe Brown, basketball player, in Ypsilanti
- March 23 - Treylon Burks, wide receiver, in Flint
- March 31 - Javon Foster, offensive tackle, in Detroit
- April 14 - Armani Williams, stock car racing driver, in Grosse Pointe
- April 24 - Courtney Sarault, short track speed skater, in Grand Rapids
- April 26 - Isaac Darkangelo, linebacker, in Brighton
- May 5 - Ben VanSumeren, football fullback, in Bay City
- May 13 - Antonio Cipriano, actor and opera singer, in Grosse Pointe Woods
- May 31 - Spencer Schwellenbach, MLB pitcher, in Saginaw
- June 1 - Rocket Watts, basketball player, in Detroit
- June 6 - BabyTron, rapper, in Ypsilanti
- June 21 - Joel Wilson, football tight end, in Petoskey
- June 26 - Yuki Nomura, baseball infielder, in Howell
- July 14 - Marcus Bingham Jr., basketball player, in Grand Rapids
- July 16 - Terry Armstrong, basketball player, in Flint
- July 27 - Quinton Barrow, football tackle, in Inkster
- July 29 - Theo Day, quarterback, in Canton
- August 6 - Alec Regula, hockey player, in West Bloomfield
- August 9 - Aidan Hutchinson, defensive end, in Plymouth
- August 17 - Olivia Nelson-Ododa, basketball player, in Lansing
- August 24 - Issa Rayyan, soccer player, in Dearborn
- August 31 - Sauce Gardner, cornerback, in Detroit
- September 5 - Max Sasson, hockey player, in Birmingham
- September 30 - Ben Ofeimu, soccer player, in West Bloomfield
- October 7 - Ryan Talbot, track and field athlete, in Alto
- October 13 - Anna Fairman, hockey player, in Troy
- December 21 - D'Wan Mathis, quarterback, in Oak Park
- 2000 - Mei Semones, jazz-influenced rock musician, in Ann Arbor

=== Gallery ===
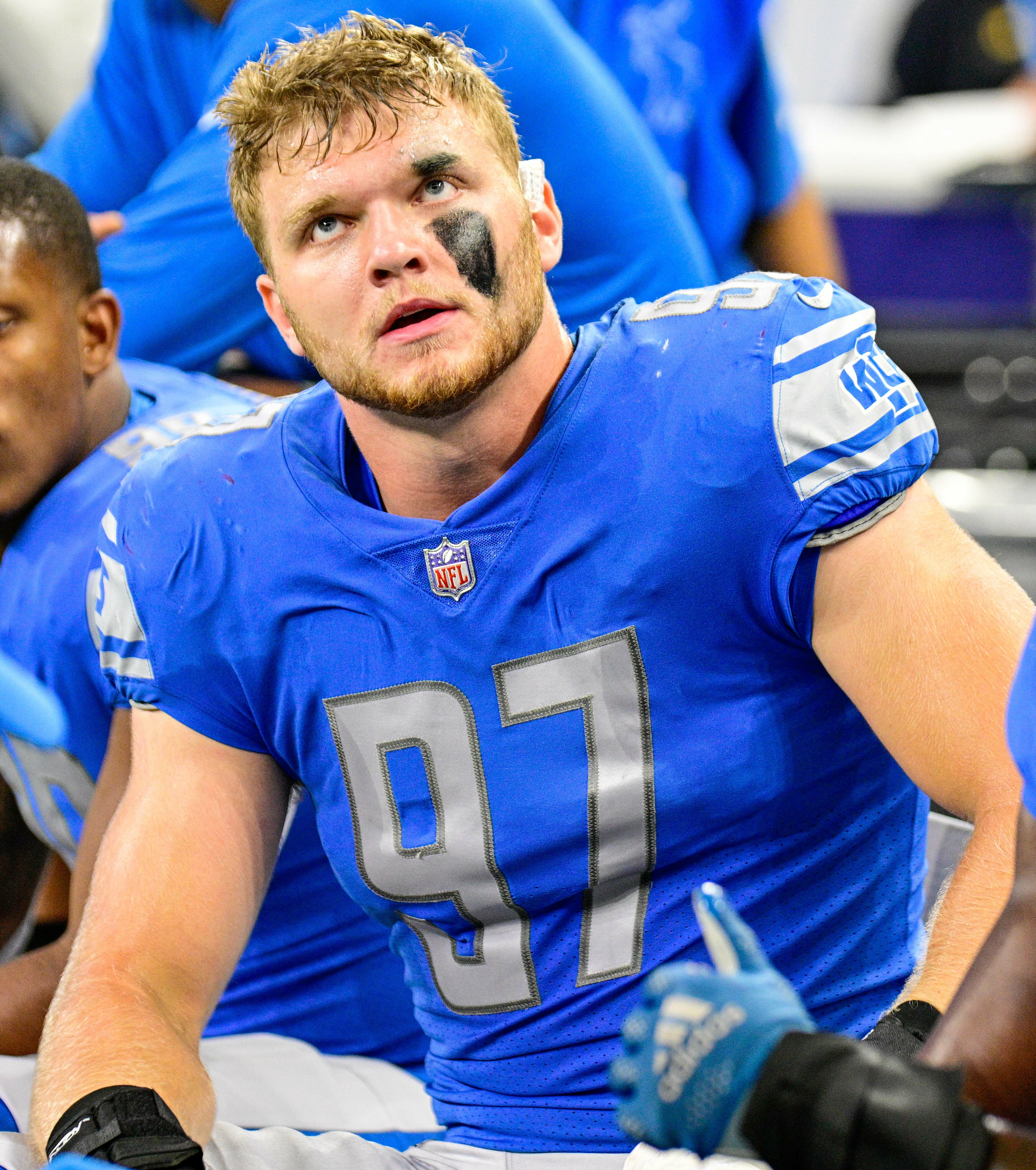
Aidan Hutchinson

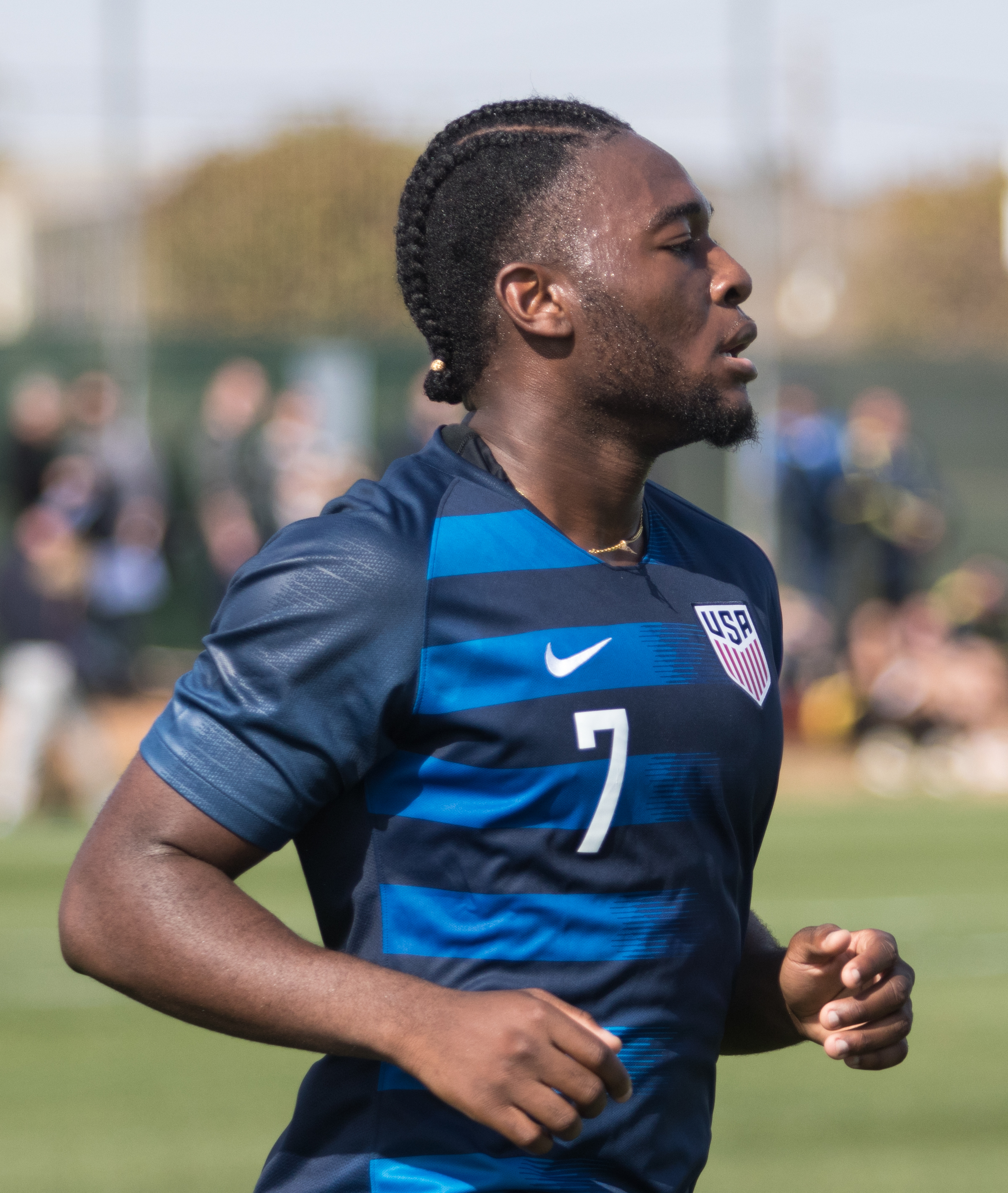
Ayo Akinola

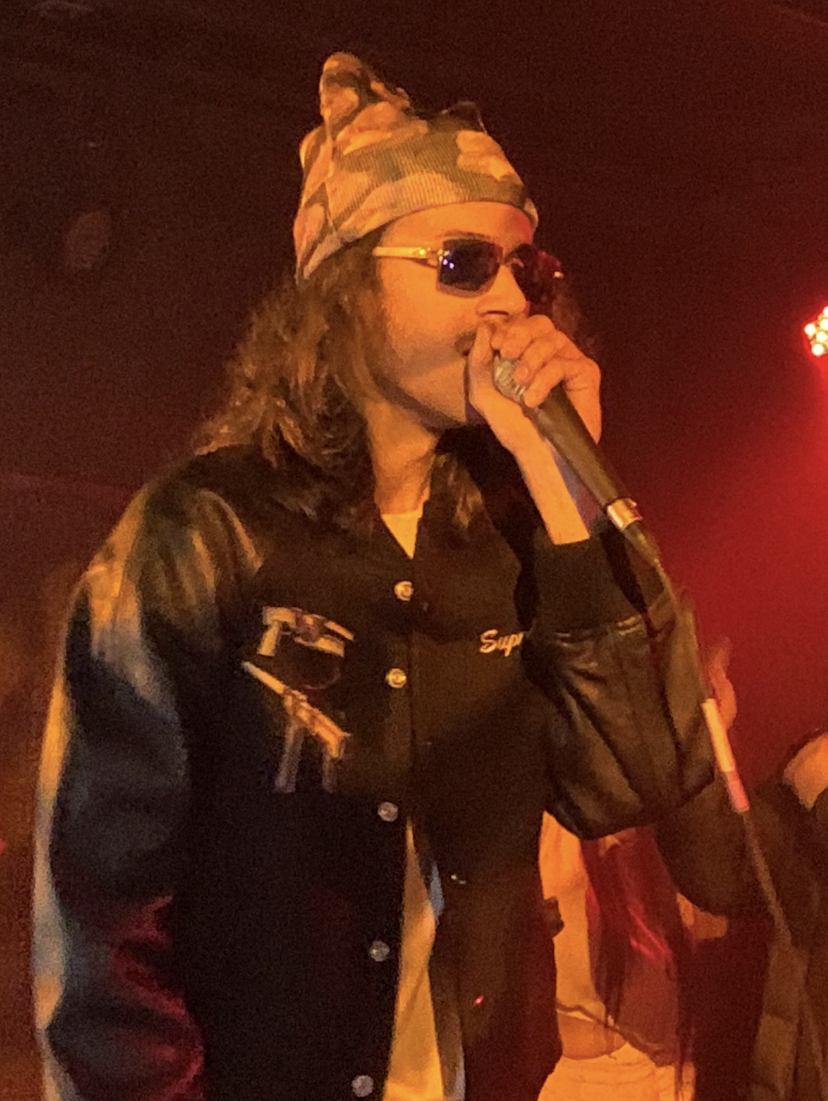
BabyTron

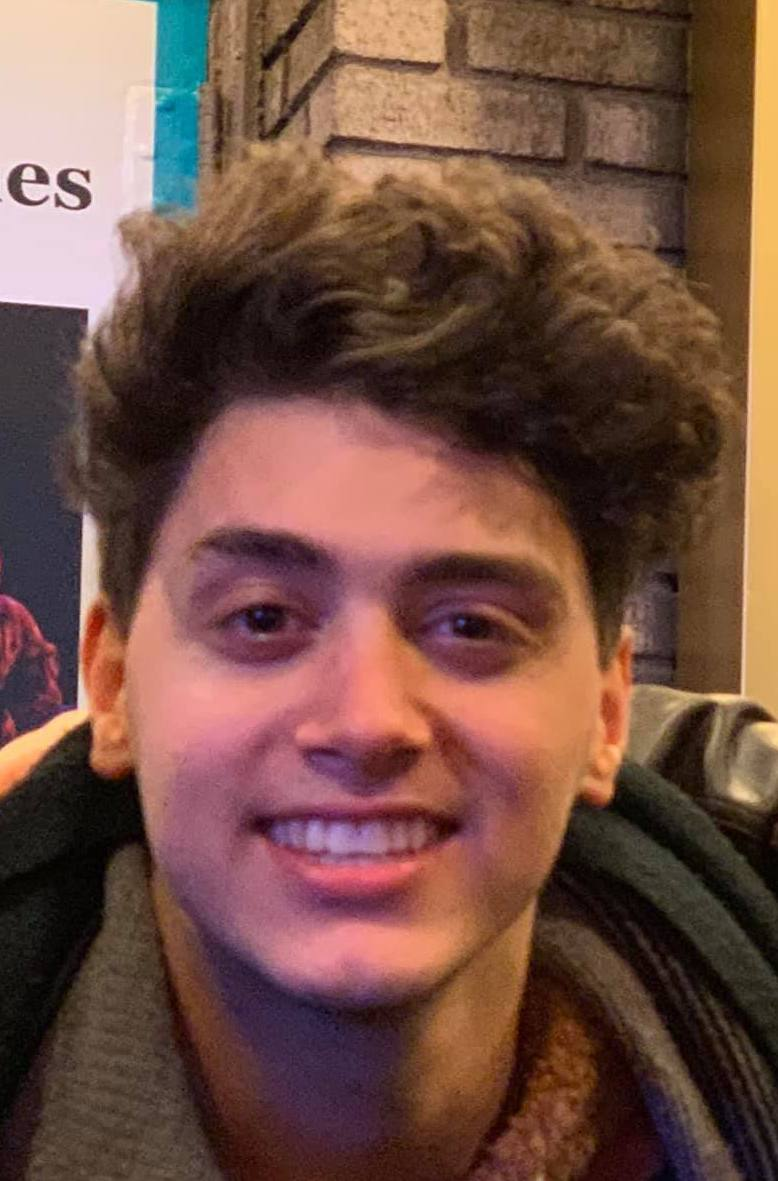
Antonio Cipriano

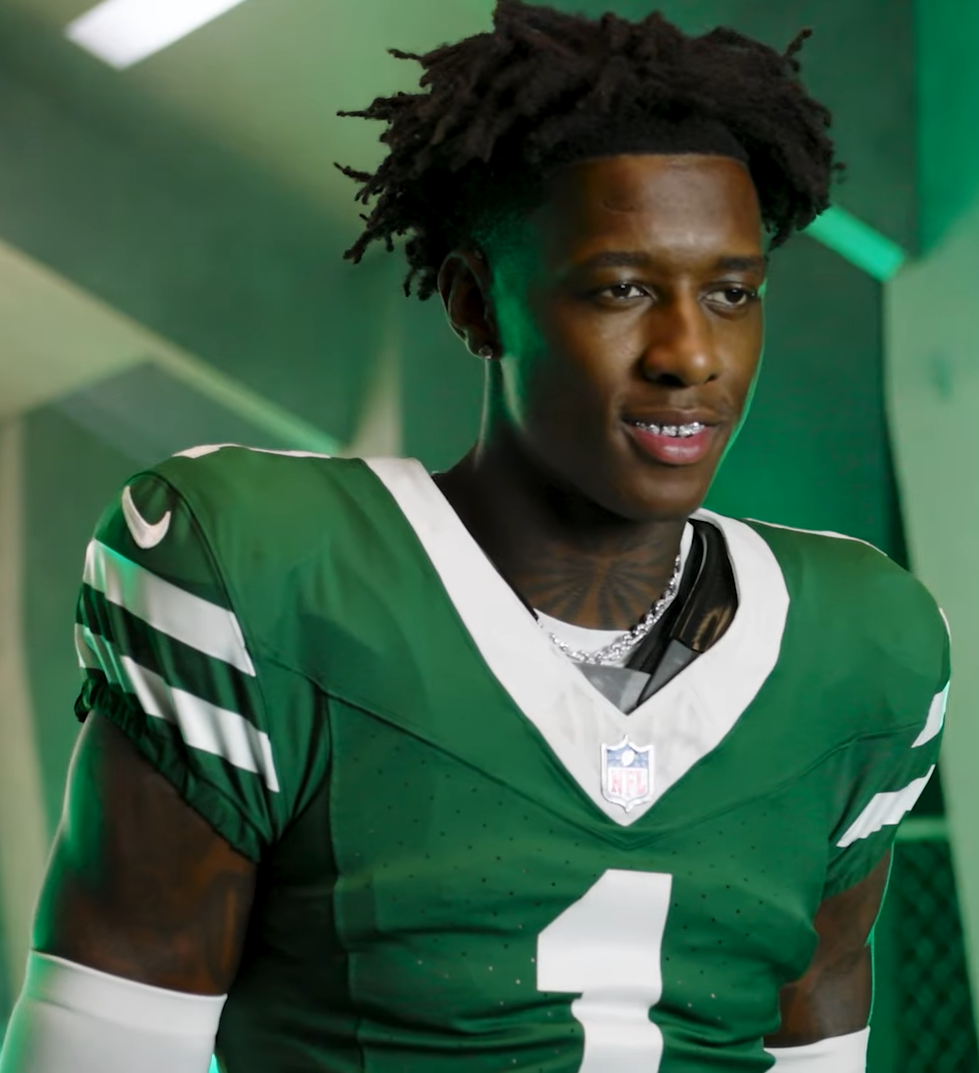
Sauce Gardner

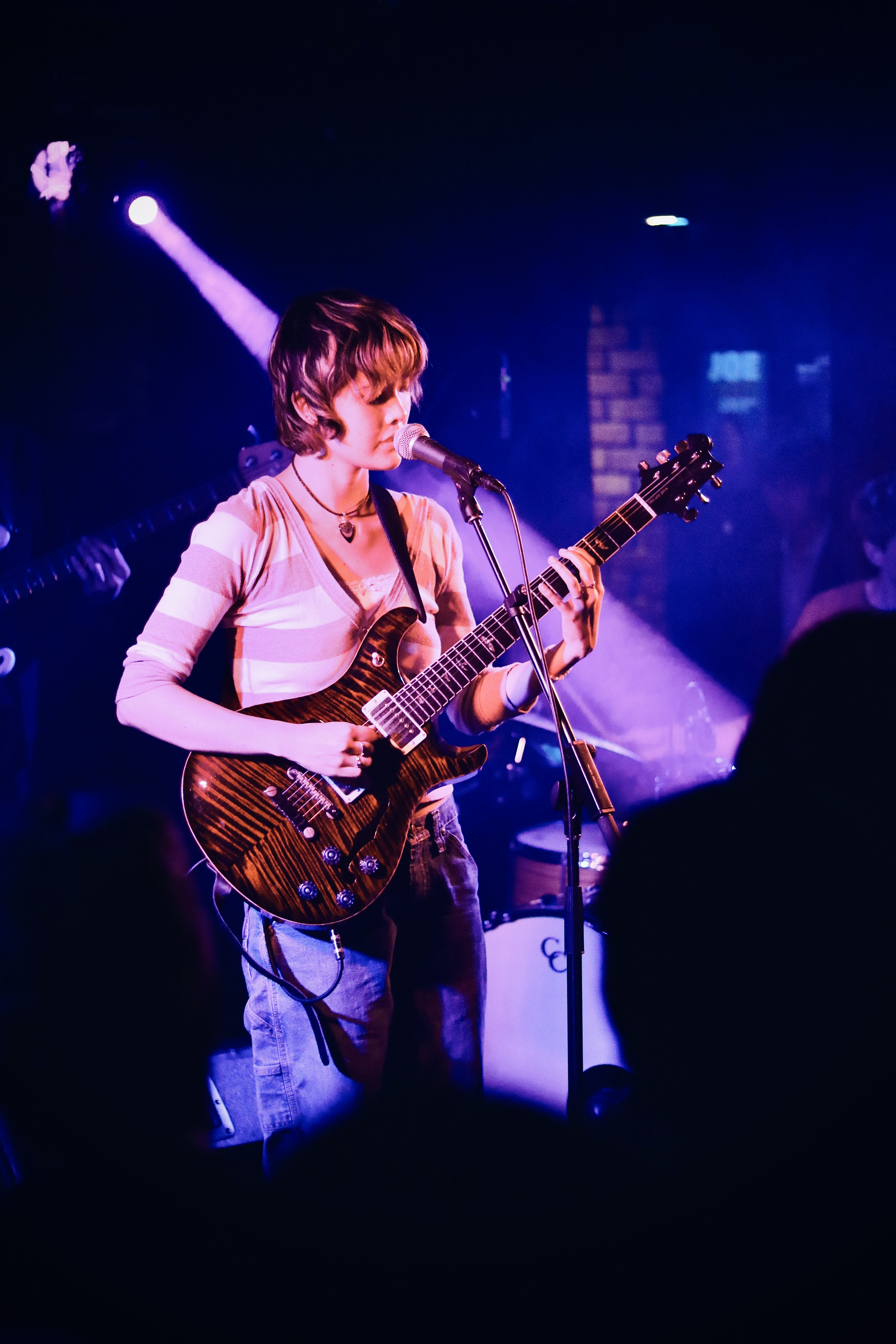
Mei Semones

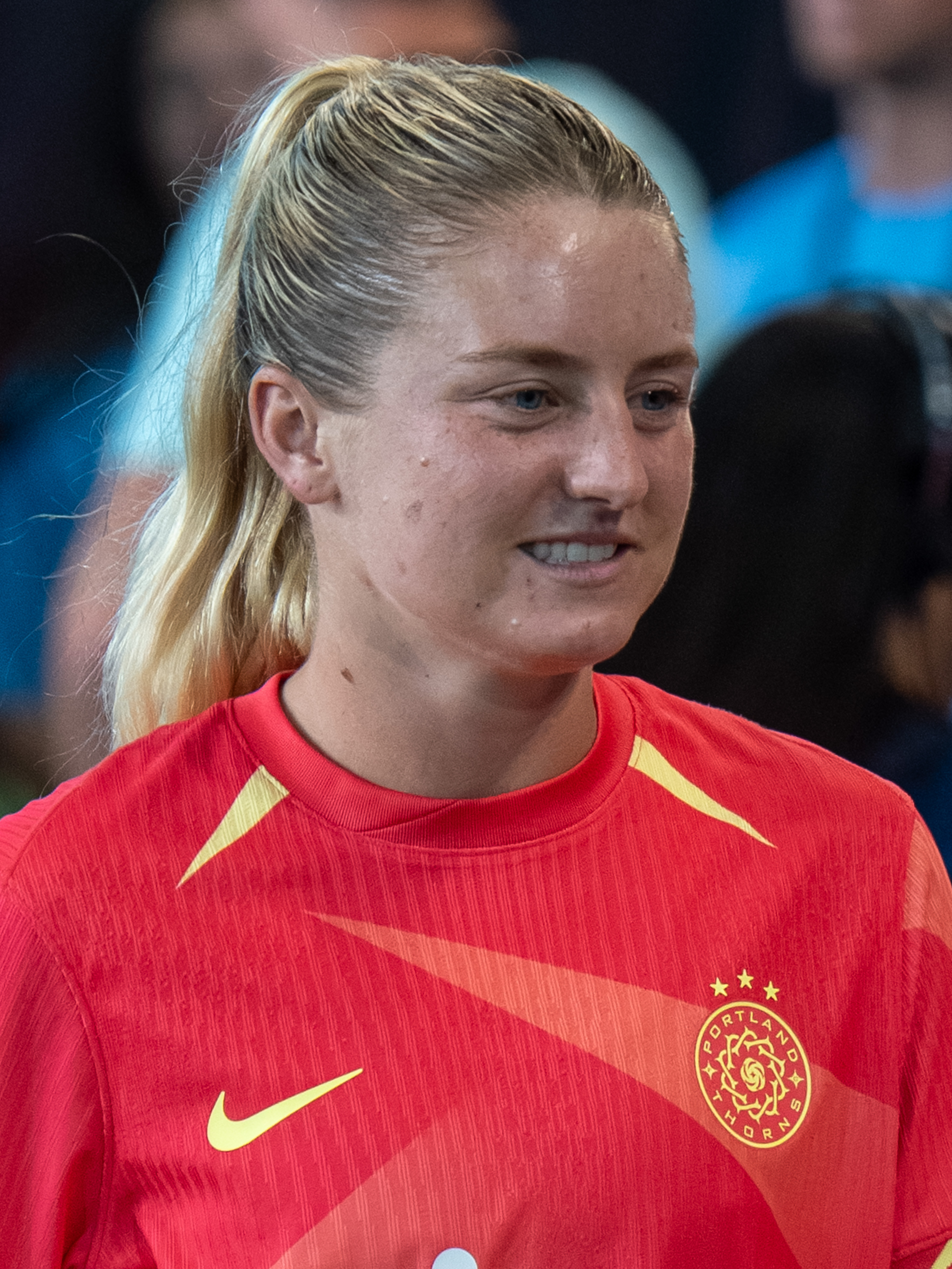
Alexa Spaanstra

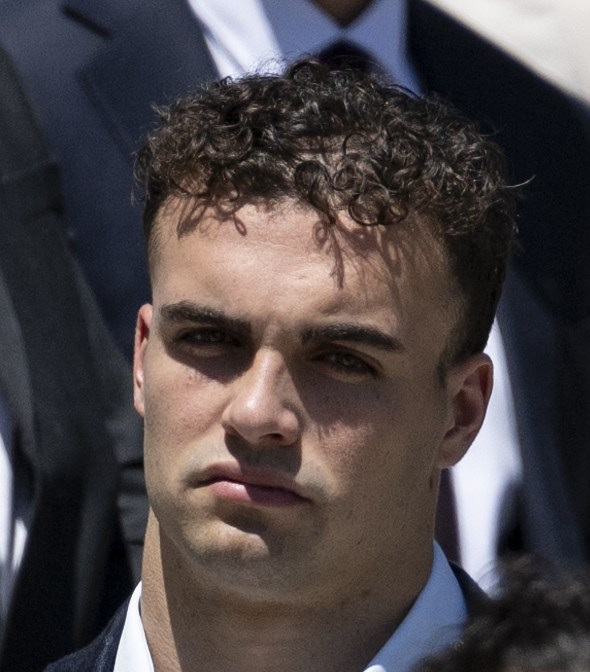
Ben VanSumeren

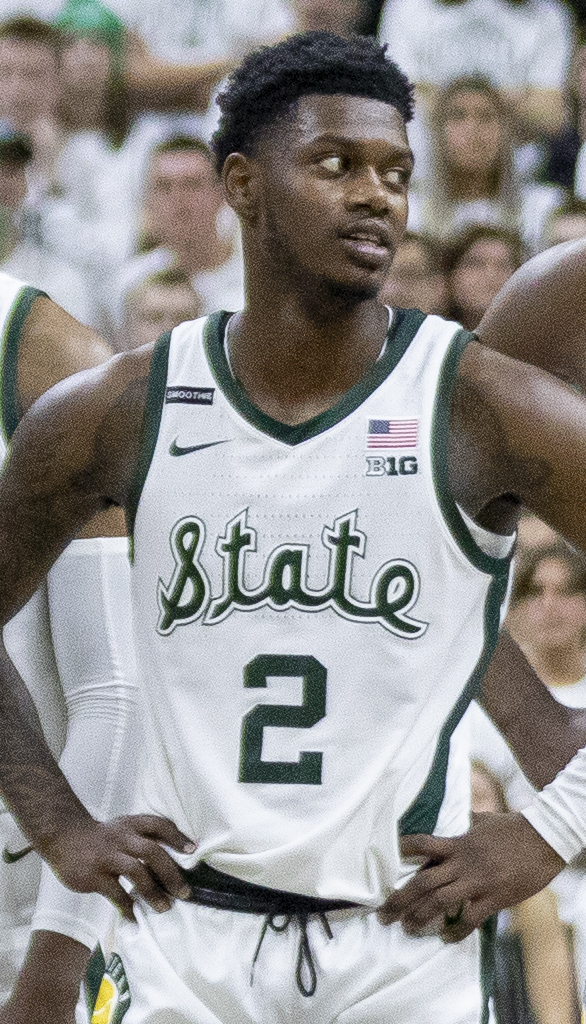
Rocket Watts

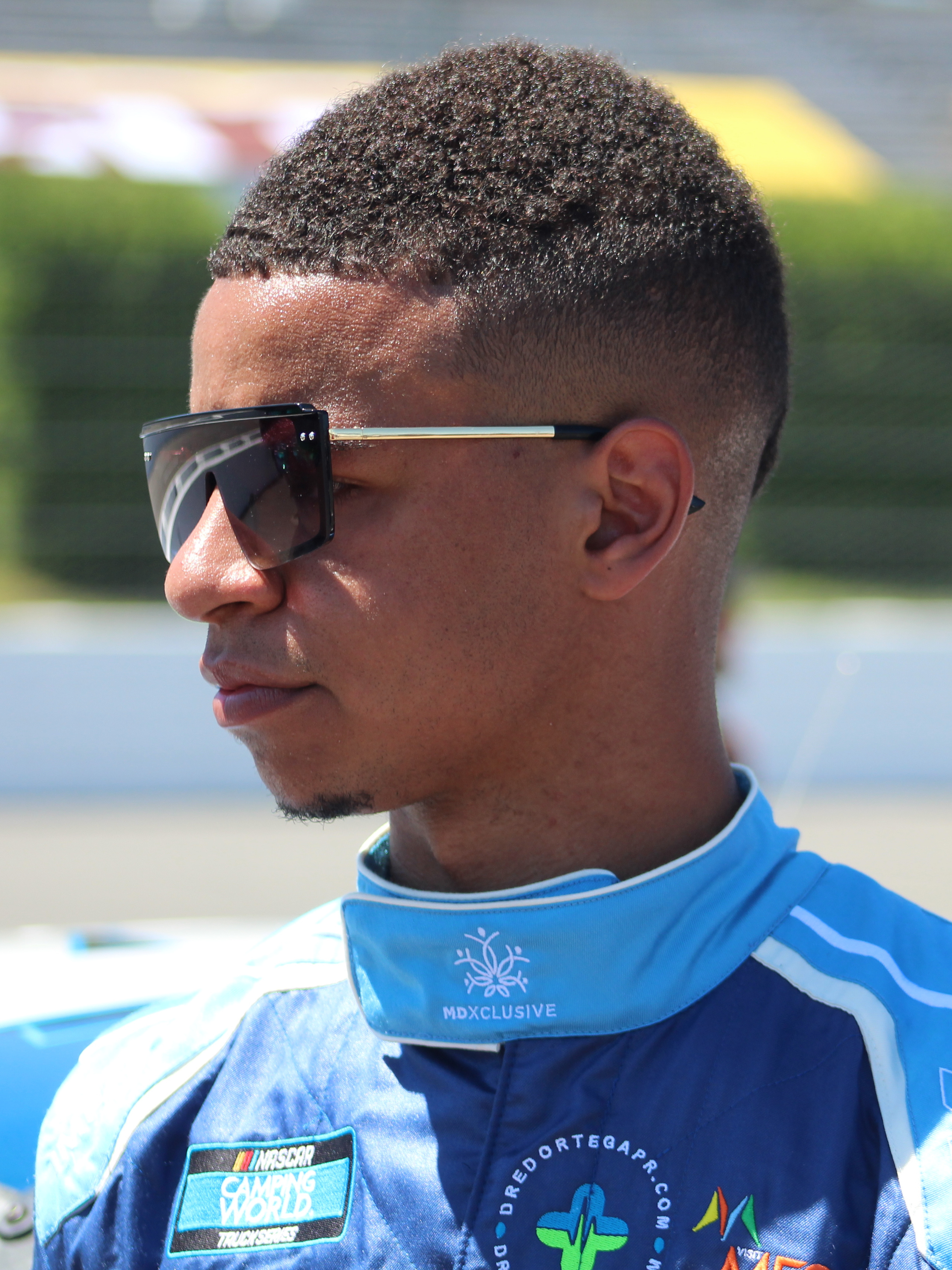
Armani Williams

== Deaths ==
- January 8 - Warren H. Wagner, botanist, at age 79
- January 13 - Arthur Henry Krawczak, auxiliary bishop of Detroit, at age 86
- January 16 - Gene Harris, jazz pianist, at age 66
- January 29 - Martha Jean "The Queen" Steinberg, radio broadcaster and pastor, at age 69
- February 1 - James V. Neel, geneticist, at age 84
- February 2 - Harry K. Cull, Flint mayor, at age 88
- February 8 - Sid Abel, Detroit Red Wings player (1938–43, 1945–52) and head coach (1957–71), at age 81
- February 20 - Albert Cleage, black nationalist Christian minister, newspaper publisher, political candidate at age 88
- March 7 - W. D. Hamilton, evolutionary biologist, at age 63
- March 10 - William Porter, hurdler won gold medal in 1948, at age 73
- March 25 - Jim Cash, screenwriter (Top Gun), at age 59
- May 2 - Harry Newman, UM quarterback (1930–32), Big Ten MVP (1932), at age 90
- May 2 - Teri Thornton, jazz singer and piano player, at age 65
- May 11 - Verna Aardema, author of children's books, at age 88
- June 14 - Peter McWilliams, self-help author and marijuana advocate, at age 50
- June 27 - Tobin Rote, Detroit Lions quarterback (1957–59), led Lions to 1957 NFL championship, at age 72
- July 1 - Cub Koda, rock musician, songwriter ("Smokin' in the Boys' Room") and critic, at age 51
- July 5 - Gloria Williams, lead singer for early incaration of Martha and the Vandellas, at age 57
- July 9 - John Vitale, UM center/guard (1985–1988), at age 34
- July 10 - Bill Munson, Detroit Lions quarterback (1968–1975), at age 58
- July 22 - Dwight E. Beach, four-star Army general, at age 92
- August 5 - Dudley Randall, African-American poet and publisher, at age 85
- September 23 - Aurelio Rodríguez, Detroit Tigers third baseman (1971–1979), at age 52
- September 29 - Pete Schmidt, Albion head football coach (1983–1996), at age 52
- October 3 - Pat Flowers, jazz pianist and singer, at age 82
- October 5 - Ruth Ellis, LGBT rights activist, at age 101
- October 7 - Leslie Kish, statistician and survey methodologist, at ag 90
- October 25 - Robert E. Waldron, Speaker of Michigan House (1967–68), at age 80
- October 28 - Howard Patterson, competitive swimmer at Michigan State and 1948 Olympics, at age 73
- November 16 - Joe C., rapper and hype man for Kid Rock, at age 26
- November 22 - David Hermelin, ambassador, philanthropist, entrepreneur, at age 63
- December 8 - Neil Staebler, U.S. Congressman (1963–65), at age 95
- December 8 - Gary Bergman, Detroit Red Wings defenseman (1964–75), at age 62
- December 24 - Howard Yerges, Michigan quarterback (1944–1947), at age 76
- December 26 - John Coatta, quarterback/coach, at age 71
- Robert Propst, inventor known as the "Father of the Cubicle", at age 79

=== Gallery ===
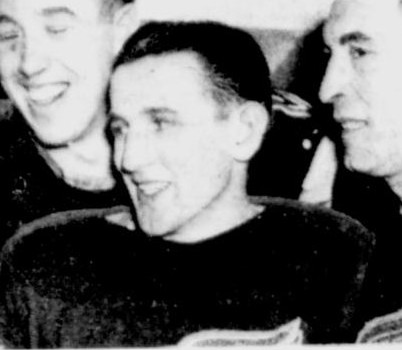
Sid Abel

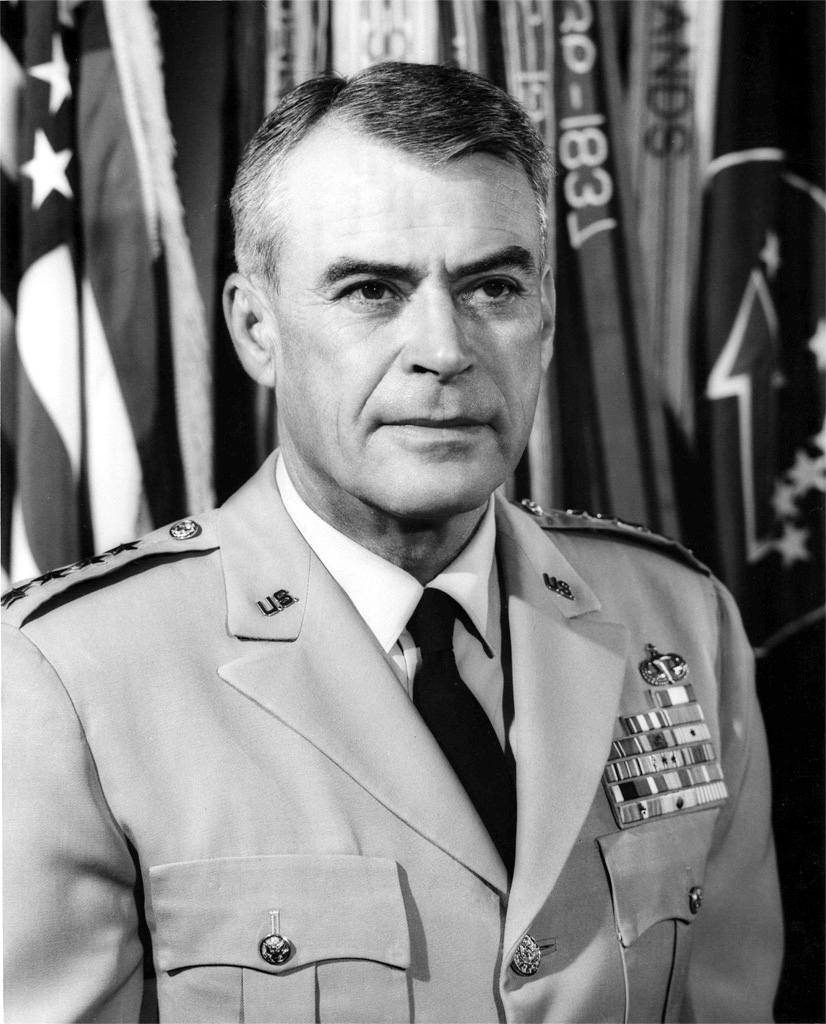
Dwight E. Beach

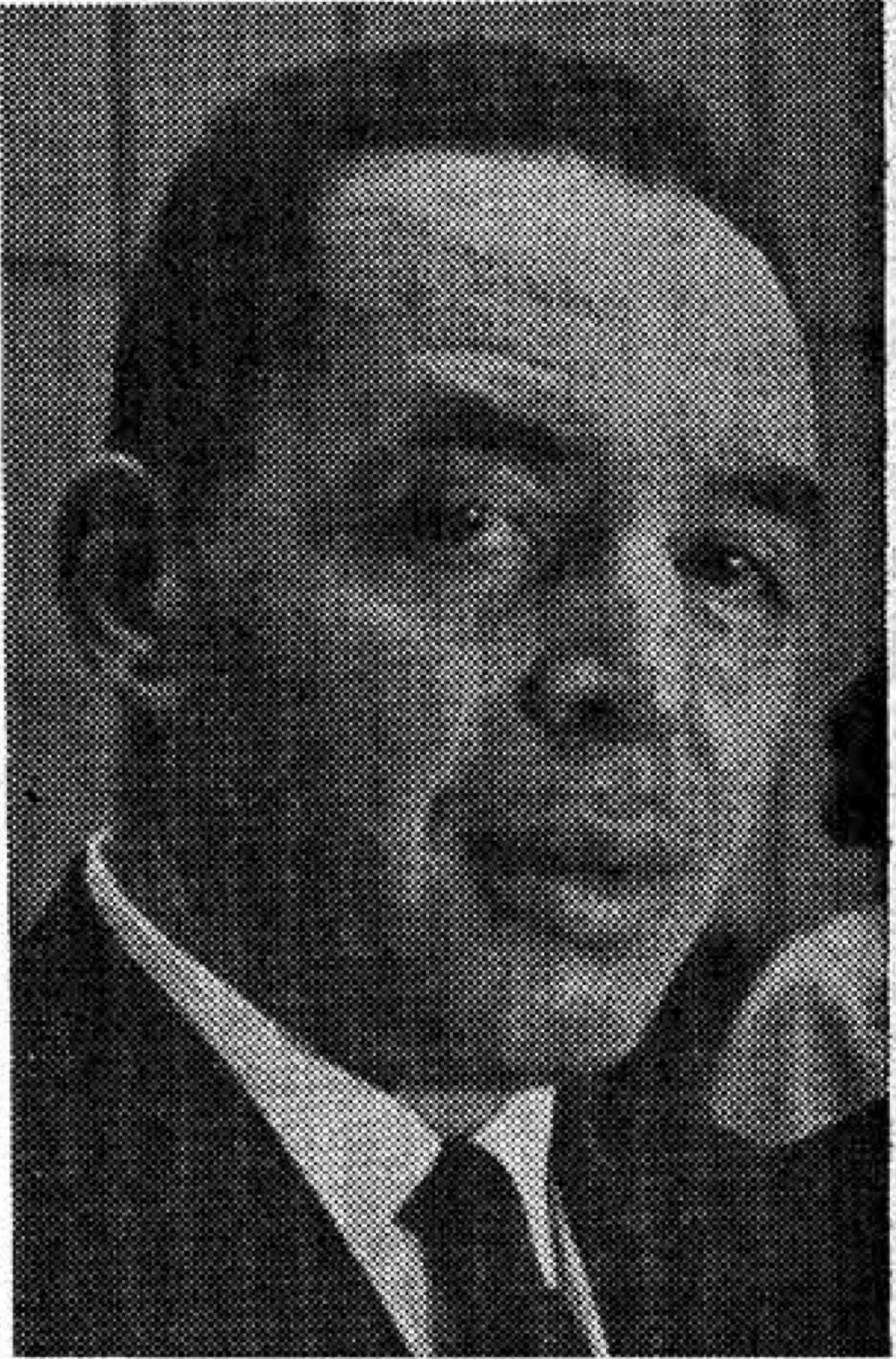
Albert Cleage

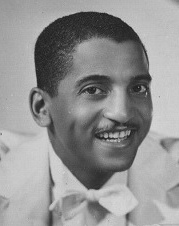
Pat Flowers

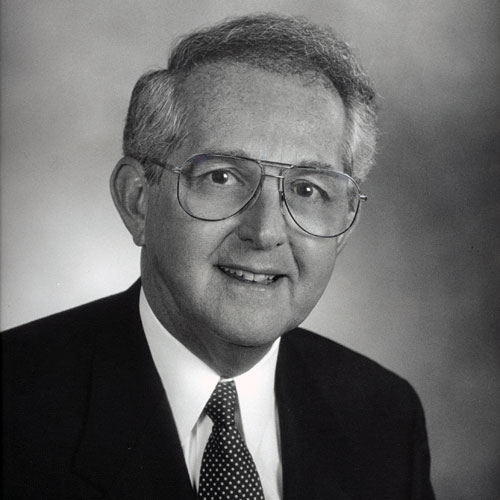
David Hermelin

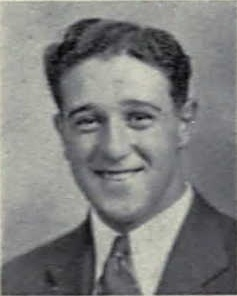
Harry Newman

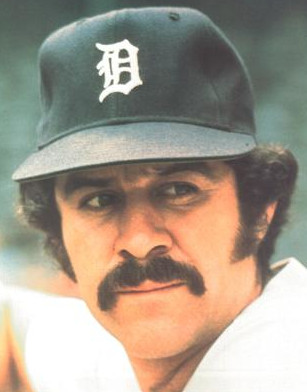
Aurelio Rodriguez

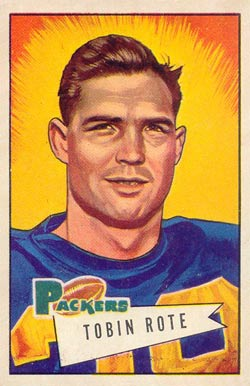
Tobin Rote

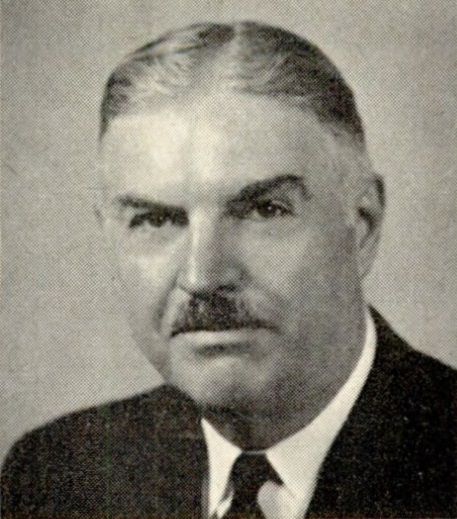
Neil Staebler

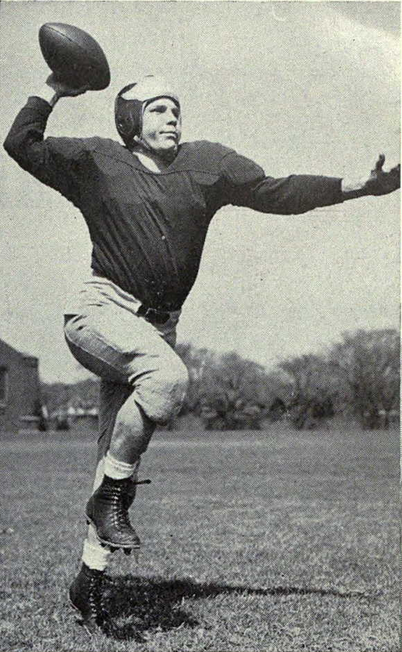
Howard Yerges

== See also ==
- 2000 in the United States
