= 1999 in Michigan =

- Decades: 1970s; 1980s; 1990s; 2000s; 2010s
- See also: History of Michigan; Historical outline of Michigan; List of years in Michigan; 1999 in the United States

This article reviews 1999 in Michigan, including the state's office holders, largest public companies, performance of sports teams, a chronology of the state's top news and sports stories, and notable Michigan-related births and deaths.

== Office holders ==
=== State office holders ===
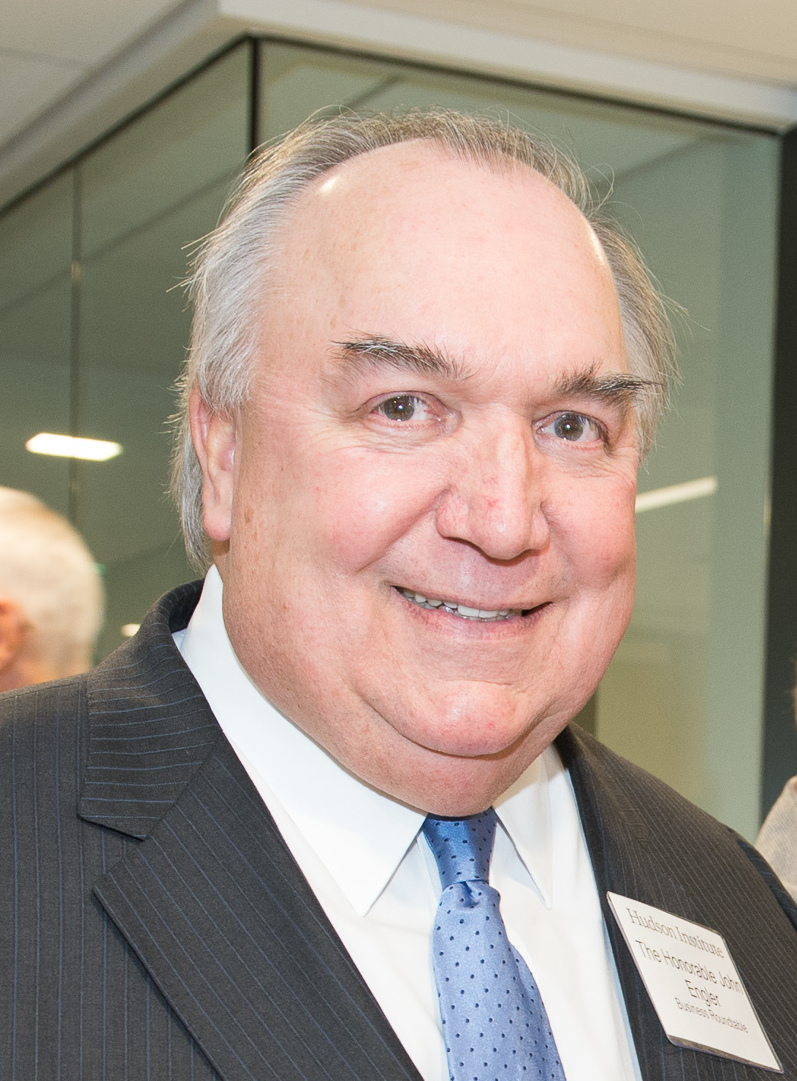
John Engler

- Governor of Michigan - John Engler (Republican)
- Lieutenant Governor of Michigan: Dick Posthumus (Republican)
- Michigan Attorney General - Jennifer Granholm (Democrat)
- Michigan Secretary of State - Terri Lynn Land (Republican)
- Speaker of the Michigan House of Representatives: Rick Johnson (Republican)
- Majority Leader of the Michigan Senate: Dan DeGrow (Republican)
- Chief Justice, Michigan Supreme Court: Elizabeth Weaver

=== Federal office holders ===
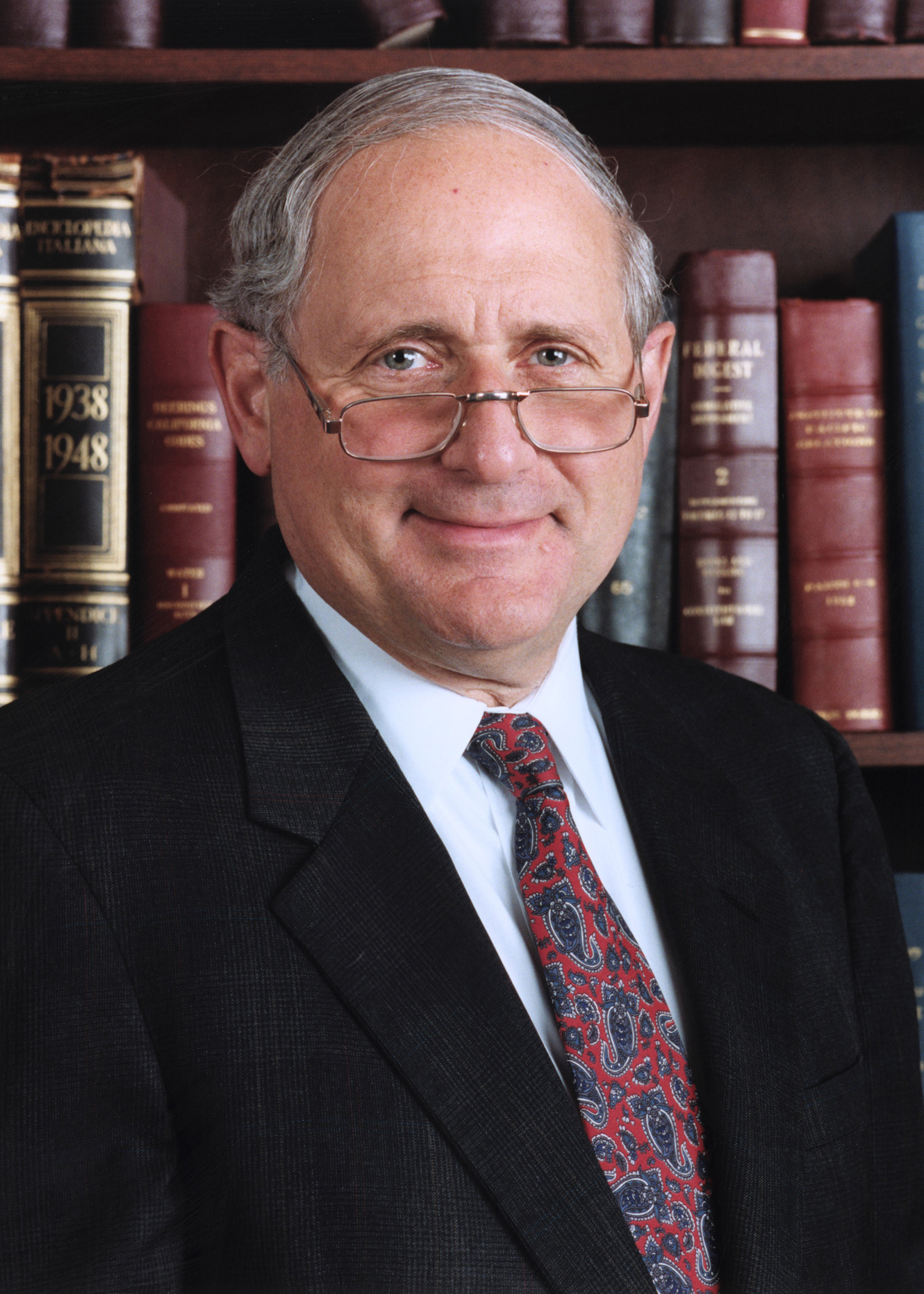
Carl Levin

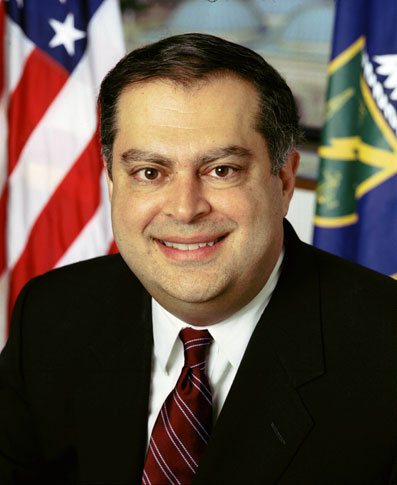
Spencer Abraham

- U.S. Senator from Michigan: Spencer Abraham (Republican])
- U.S. Senator from Michigan: Carl Levin (Democrat)
- House District 1: Bart Stupak (Democrat)
- House District 2: Pete Hoekstra (Republican)
- House District 3: Vern Ehlers (Republican)
- House District 4: Dave Camp (Republican)
- House District 5: James Barcia (Democrat)
- House District 6: Fred Upton (Republican)
- House District 7: Nick Smith (Republican)
- House District 8: Debbie Stabenow (Democrat)
- House District 9: Dale Kildee (Democrat)
- House District 10: David Bonior (Democrat)
- House District 11: Joe Knollenberg (Republican)
- House District 12: Sander Levin (Democrat)
- House District 13: Lynn N. Rivers (Democrat)
- House District 14: John Conyers (Democrat)
- House District 15: Carolyn Cheeks Kilpatrick (Democrat)
- House District 16: John Dingell (Democrat)

=== Mayors of major cities ===
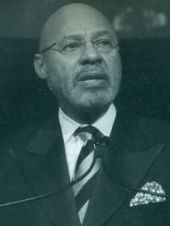
Dennis Archer

- Mayor of Detroit: Dennis Archer (Democrat)
- Mayor of Grand Rapids: John H. Logie
- Mayor of Ann Arbor: Ingrid Sheldon (Republican)
- Mayor of Lansing: David Hollister
- Mayor of Flint: Woodrow Stanley
- Mayor of Saginaw: Gary L. Loster (Democrat)

== Largest public companies ==
In April 2000, the Detroit Free Press released its first annual "The Free Press 50" list of the largest Michigan-based public companies based on 1999 revenues. The top 20 companies are shown below. Although it had substnatial operations in Michigan, Daimler-Chrysler was not included on the list because it was based in Germany.

Rank	Company	Headquarters	Business	1999 revenue (in millions)	1999 profit (in millions)
1	General Motors	Detroit	Autos	$176,558	$6,002
2	Ford	Dearborn	Autos	$162,558	$7,237
3	Kmart	Troy	Retailer	$35,925	$403
4	Delphi	Troy	Auto supplier	$29,192	$1,083
5	Dow Chemical Company	Midland	Chemicals	$18,929	$1,331
6	Lear Corporation	Southfield	Auto supplier	$12,428	$257
7	Whirlpool Corporation	Benton Harbor	Appliances	$10,511	$347
8	Kellogg's	Battle Creek	Food	$6,984	$338
9	Federal-Mogul	Southfield	Auto supplier	$6,487	$243
10	Masco	Taylor	Building products	$6,307	$569
11	CMS Energy	Dearborn	Utility	$6,103	$339
12	DTE Energy	Detroit	Utility	$4,728	$483
13	Meritor	Troy	Auto supplier	$4,450	$194
14	Kelly Services	Troy	Staffing	$4,269	$85
15	Comerica	Detroit	Financial services	$3,389	$673
16	PulteGroup	Bloomfield Hills	Home builders	$3,730	$178
17	Steelcase	Grand Rapids	Office furniture	$3,316	$184
18	Borders Group	Ann Arbor	Books, music, video	$2,999	$90
19	American Axle	Detroit	Auto supplier	$2,953	$115
20	SPX	Muskegon	Machine tools	$2,712	$101

== Sports ==
=== Baseball ===
- 1999 Detroit Tigers season - In their second and final year under manager Larry Parrish, the Tigers compiled a 69–92 record and finished in third place of the American League Central. The team's statistical leaders included Dean Palmer (38 home runs, 100 RBIs), Luis Polonia (.324 batting average), Juan Encarnación (33 stolen bases), Dave Mlicki (14 wins, 119 strikeouts), and Doug Brocail (2.52 earned run average.

=== American football ===
- 1999 Detroit Lions season - In their third year under head coach Bobby Ross, the Lions compiled an 8–8 record and finished third in the NFC Central. The team's statistical leaders included Gus Frerotte (2,117 passing yards), Greg Hill (542 rushing yards), Germane Crowell (1,338 receiving yards), and Jason Hanson (106 points scored).
- 1999 Michigan Wolverines football team - In their fifth year under head coach Lloyd Carr, the Wolverines compiled a 10–2 record and defeated Alabama in the 2000 Orange Bowl. The team's statistical leaders included Tom Brady (2,217 passing yards), Anthony Thomas (1,257 rushing yards, 96 points), and David Terrell (888 receiving yards).
- 1999 Michigan State Spartans football team - In their fifth and final year under Nick Saban, the Spartans compiled a 10–2 record, defeated Florida in the 2000 Florida Citrus Bowl, and were ranked No. 7 in the final AP and coaches polls. The team's statistical leaders included Bill Burke (1,957 passing yards), Lloyd Clemons (854 rushing yards), Plaxico Burress (957 receiving yards), and Paul Edinger (104 points scored).

=== Basketball ===
- 1998–99 Detroit Pistons season - Led by head coach Alvin Gentry, the Pistons compiled a 29–21 (.580) record.
- 2000 Detroit Shock season - The team compiled a 15–17 (.469) record.
- 1998–99 Michigan State Spartans men's basketball team - In their fourth season under Tom Izzo, the Spartans compiled a 33–6 record and advanced to the Final Four, losing to No. 1 Duke.
- 1998–99 Michigan Wolverines men's basketball team - Led by Brian Ellerbe, the Wolverines compiled a 12–13 record, but all wins were later vacted.
- 1999 Michigan State riot - A student riot followed Michigan State's loss to Duke in the Final Four on March 27, 1999, with 132 arrests.

=== Ice hockey ===
- 1998–99 Detroit Red Wings season - Led by coach Scotty Bowman, the Red Wings compiled a 43–32–7 record. the team's statistical leaders included Brendan Shanahan (31 goals), Igor Larionov (49 assists), Steve Yzerman (74 points), and Chris Osgood (34 wins in goal, 2.42 goals against average).

=== Other ===
- 1999 ITT Automotive Detroit Grand Prix
- 1999 Pepsi 400 presented by Meijer
- 1999 Kmart 400
- Naseem Hamed vs. César Soto

== Chronology of events ==
- January 17 - Death of Samantha Reid
- February 18 - Crowley's department stores, opened in 1909, filed for bankrutcy
- March 27 -
- 1999 Michigan State riot: student riot followed Michigan State's loss to Duke in the Final Four with 132 arrests.
- June 29 - last day of vehicle assembly plant operations at Buick City
- October 22 - Naseem Hamed vs. César Soto: featherweight championship boxing match at Joe Louis Arena in Detroit

== Births ==
- January 12 - Xavier Tillman, basketball power forward, in Grand Rapids, Michigan
- January 29 - Meghan Beaubien, softball pitcher for U-M (2018–2022), Big Ten Pitcher of the Year, in Newport, Michigan
- February 19 - Donovan People-Jones, wide receiver for U-M (2017–19), Detroit Lions (2923–24), in Detroit
- March 28 - Anavia Battle, sprinter in 100m and 200m, in Inkster, Michigan
- May 24 - Myth, on-line gamer (Fortnite Battle Royale), in Dearborn, Michigan
- May 30 - Sean Giambrone, actor (The Goldbergs, Kim Possible), in St. Joseph, Michigan
- August 11 - Cayden Primeau, NHL goalie, in Farmington Hills, Michigan
- September 29 - Taylor Manson, 400m runner and gold medalist, East Lansing
- November 23 - Jake Moody, placekicker U-M (2018–22), NFL (2023–35), in Commerce, Michigan

== Deaths ==
- March 12 - Bob Hollway, Michigan end (1947–49), Detroit Lions assistant coach (1971–72), at age 73
- April 28 - Donald E. Stewart, screenwriter (Missing, The Hunt for Red October), at age 69
- July 20 - Watson Spoelstra, sportswriter for The Detroit News (1945–1973), at age 89
- September 22 - George C. Scott, actor and graduate of Redford High School, at age 71
- October 9 - Milt Jackson, jazz vibraphonist, at age 76

== See also ==
- 1999 in the United States
