= 2001 in Michigan =

- Decades: 1980s; 1990s; 2000s; 2010s; 2020s
- See also: History of Michigan; Historical outline of Michigan; List of years in Michigan; 2001 in the United States

This article reviews 2001 in Michigan, including the state's office holders, largest public companies, performance of sports teams, a chronology of the state's top news and sports stories, and notable Michigan-related births and deaths.

== Top stories ==
- Kwame Kilpatrick, at age 31, elected mayor of Detroit.
- Air Force officer and Michigander Nick Mellos released from detention in China.
- Census data showed that Detroit's population fell below 1 million, while Oakland County's population surged.
- Detroit celebrated its tricentennial.

== Office holders ==
=== State office holders ===
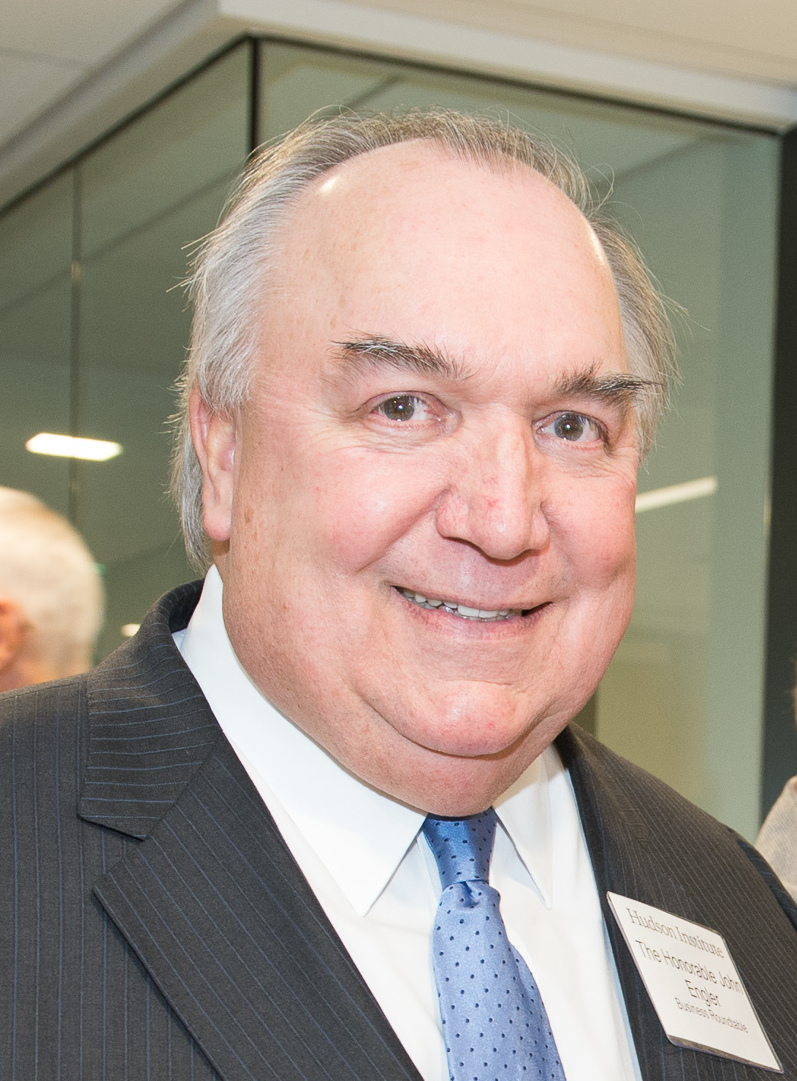
John Engler

- Governor of Michigan - John Engler (Republican)
- Lieutenant Governor of Michigan: Dick Posthumus (Rpublican)
- Michigan Attorney General - Jennifer Granholm (Democrat)
- Michigan Secretary of State - Richard H. Austin (Democrat)
- Speaker of the Michigan House of Representatives: Rick Johnson (Republican)
- Majority Leader of the Michigan Senate: Dan DeGrow (Republican)
- Chief Justice, Michigan Supreme Court: Maura D. Corrigan

=== Federal office holders ===
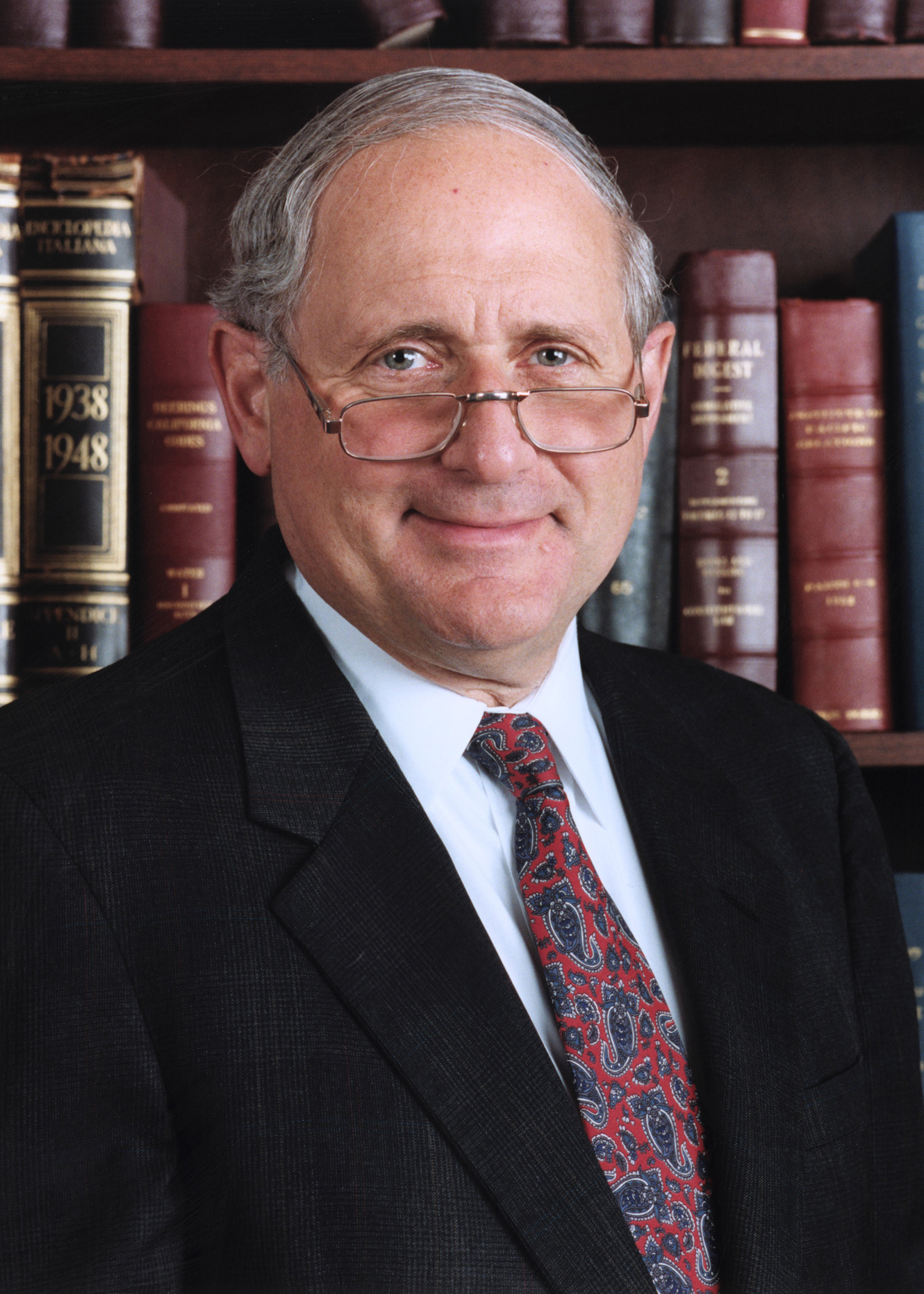
Carl Levin

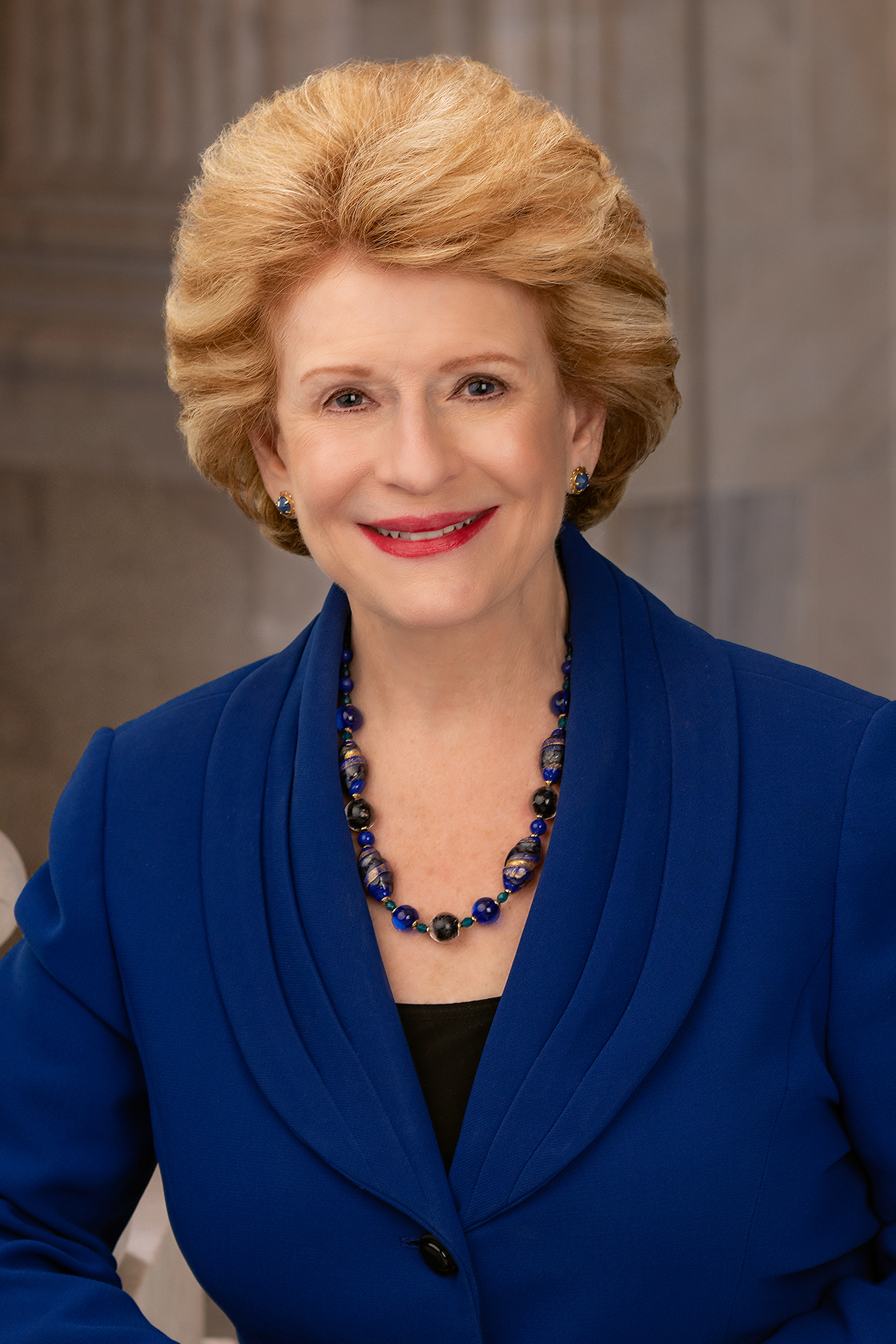
Debbie Stabenow

- U.S. senator from Michigan: Debbie Stabenow (Democrat])
- U.S. senator from Michigan: Carl Levin (Democrat)
- House District 1: Bart Stupak (Democrat)
- House District 2: Pete Hoekstra (Republican)
- House District 3: Vern Ehlers (Republican)
- House District 4: Dave Camp (Republican)
- House District 5: Dale Kildee (Democrat)
- House District 6: Fred Upton (Republican)
- House District 7: Nick Smith (Republican)
- House District 8: Mike Rogers (Republican)
- House District 9: Joe Knollenberg (Democrat)
- House District 10: Candice Miller (Republican)
- House District 11: Thaddeus McCotter (Republican)
- House District 12: Sander Levin (Democrat)
- House District 13: Lynn N. Rivers (Democrat)
- House District 14: John Conyers (Democrat)
- House District 14: Carolyn Cheeks Kilpatrick (Democrat)
- House District 16: John Dingell (Democrat)

=== Mayors of major cities ===
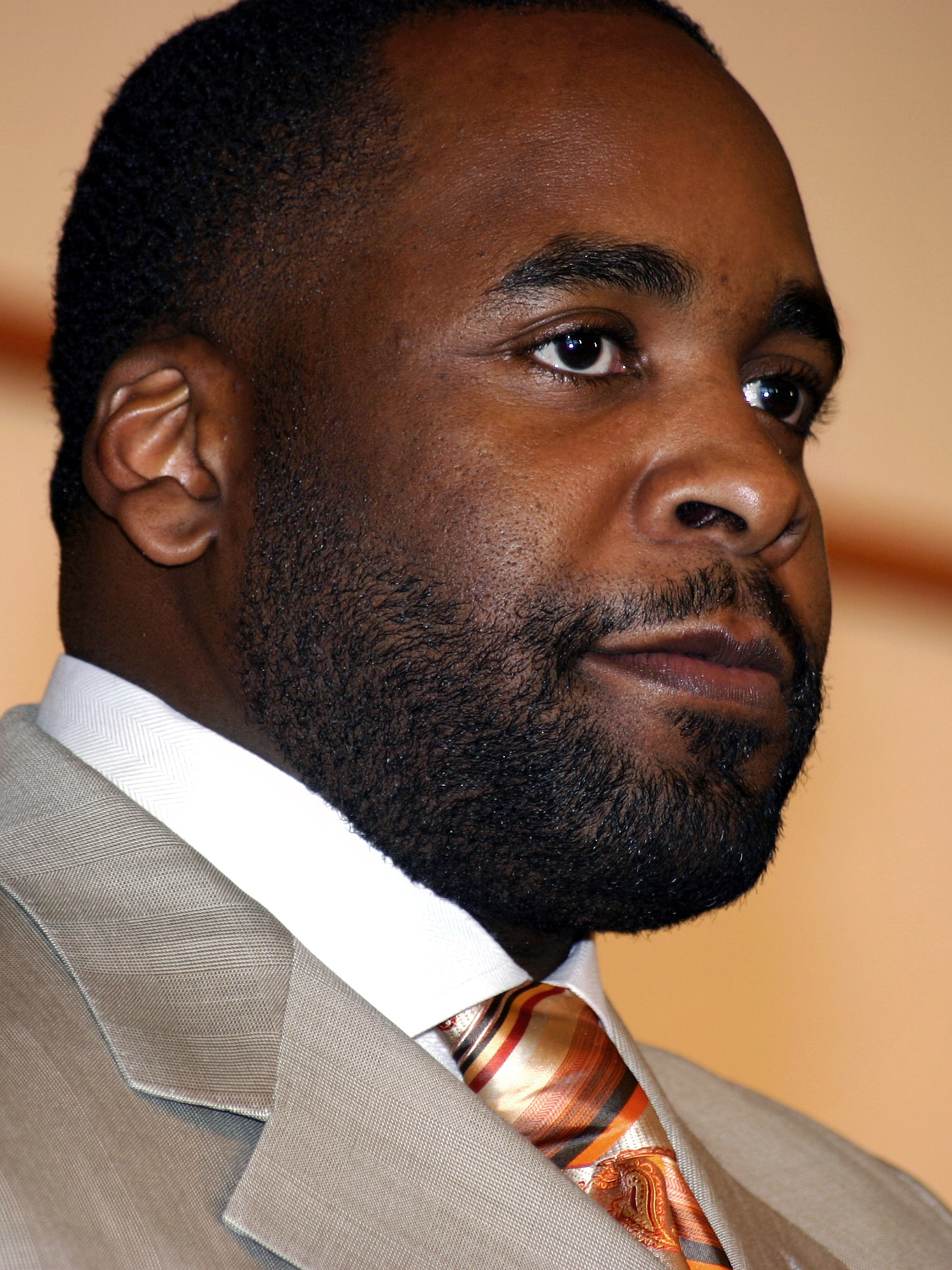
Kwame Kilpatrick

- Mayor of Detroit: Kwame Kilpatrick (Democrat)
- Mayor of Grand Rapids: John H. Logie
- Mayor of Ann Arbor: John Hieftje (Democrat)
- Mayor of Lansing: Antonio Benavides
- Mayor of Flint: James W. Rutherford
- Mayor of Saginaw: Wilmer Jones Ham

== Largest public companies ==
In April 2002, the Detroit Free Press released its annual "The Free Press 50" list of the largest Michigan-based public companies based on 2001 revenues. The top 20 companies are shown below.

== Sports ==
=== Baseball ===
- 2001 Detroit Tigers season - In their second season under manager Phil Garner, the Tigers compiled a 66–96 record.

=== American football ===
- 2001 Detroit Lions season - In their first season under head coach Marty Mornhinweg, and their last season in the Pontiac Silverdome, the Lions compiled a 2–14 record and finished last in the NFC Central.
- 2001 Michigan Wolverines football team - In their seventh season under head coach Lloyd Carr, the Wolverines compiled an 8–4 record, ending with a 45–17 loss to Tennessee in the 2002 Florida Citrus Bowl.
- 2001 Michigan State Spartans football team - In their second season under head coach Bobby Williams, the Spartans compiled a 7–5 record.
- 2001 Grand Valley State Lakers football team - In their 11th season under head coach Brian Kelly, the Lakers compiled a 13–1 record, their only loss coming by a 17-14 score against North Dakota in the NCAA Division II Championship Game.

=== Basketball ===
- 2000–01 Detroit Pistons season - In their first and only season under head coach George Irvine, the Pistons compiled a 32–50 record and finished fifth in the NBA Central Division.
- 2001 Detroit Shock season - The Shock compiled a 10–22 record.
- 2000–01 Michigan State Spartans men's basketball team - In their sixth season under head coach Tom Izzo, the Spartans compiled a 28–5 record and advanced to the Final Four where they lost to Arizona.
- 2000–01 Michigan Wolverines men's basketball team - In their fourth and final season under head coach Brian Ellerbe, the Wolverines compiled a 10–18 record.

=== Ice hockey ===
- 2000–01 Detroit Red Wings season - .In their eighth season under head coach Scotty Bowman, the Red Wings compiled a 49–20–9–4 record and were upset in the first round of the playoffs by the seventh-seeded Los Angeles Kings.

== Births ==
- June 14 - Sreeleela, actress in Telugu cineman, in Detroit
- August 16 - Lew Nichols III, football running back, led NCAA Division I FBS with 1,710 rushing yards in 2021, in Detroit
- August 29 - Teejayx6, rapper and originator of scam rap, in Detroit
- October 3 - SoFaygo, rapper, singer and songwriter, in Grand Rapids, Michigan
- December 20 - Isabelle Kadzban, soccer player, Chile national team, in Grand Rapids, Michigan

== Deaths ==
- January 7 - Lowell Perry, U-M football (1950-52), chairman of EEOC (1975-76), at age 69
- January 14 - Dennis Fitzgerald, U-M football MVP (1960), football coach (1964-1999), at age 64
- January 16 - Leonard Woodcock, UAW president (1970-77), Ambassador to China (1979-81), at age 89
- February 15 - Burt Kennedy, screenwriter and director known for his Westerns, at age 78
- February 23 - Anthony Giacalone, at Detroit "capo" with whom Jimmy Hoffa was scheduled to meet on the day he disappeared, age 82
- February 24 - Claude Shannon, "father of information theory" who laid the foundations of the Information Age, at age 84
- March 13 - Walter Dukes, Detroit Pistons (1957-63), Harlem Globetrotters (1953-55), at age 70
- April 10 - Andy Farkas, football fullback University of Detroit and Detroit Lions, NFL scoring leader with Redskins in 1939, at age 84
- April 20 - Richard H. Austin, Michigan Secretary of State (1971-1995), at age 87
- April 23 - Robert J. Huber, US Congress (1973-75), at age 76
- April 25 - Gwen Frostic, artist and author, at age 94
- May 12 - Ollie Cline, Detroit Lions fullback (1950-53), at age 75
- May 17 - Ike Brown, Detroit Tigers utility player (1969-74), at age 59
- May 20 - Bill Hewlett, co-founder of Hewlett-Packard, at age 87
- June 21 - John Lee Hooker, blues singer, guitarist, songwriter ("Boogie Chillen", "Crawling King Snake", "Boom Boom", "Dimples"), at age 83 or 88
- June 24 - William H. Sewell, sociologist and University of Wisconsin president, at age 91
- June 30 - Joe Henderson, jazz tenor saxophonist, at age 64
- July 3 - Lelord Kordel, nutritionist, author, and adviser to Hollywood stars, promoted low-carbohydrate diet, jailed for making false claims, at age 92
- July 6 - Heinz Prechter, popularized the sunroof for American cars, at age 59
- July 12 - Charleszetta Waddles, minister and founder of the Mother Waddles Perpetual Mission that provided food and services to the poor of Detroit, at age 88
- July 17 - Elon "Chief" Hogsett, Detroit Tigers pitcher (1929-36), at age 97
- August 25 - Aaliyah, singer, actress, model, at age 22
- September 6 - Frank Christensen, Detroit Lions fullback (1934-37), at age 91
- September 11 - Todd Beamer, Flint native and UA Flight 93 passenger who attempted to regain control from hijackers, at age 32
- September 28 - James H. Brickley, Michigan Supreme Court (1982-1999), Michigan lieutenant governor (1971-74, 1979-82), President of Eastern Michigan University (1975-78), at age 72
- October 3 - Homer Elias, Detroit Lions guard (1978-84), at age 46
- October 9 - William A. Ryan, Michigan House of Representatives (1958-82), Speaker (1969-74), at age 82
- November 16 - Tommy Flanagan, jazz pianist and composer, at age 71
- November 27 - Mary S. Coleman, Michigan Supreme Court (1973-82), at age 87
- December 18 - Jim Letherer, civil rights activist, walked on one leg in Selma to Montgomery march and March Against Fear, at age 67
- December 25 - Billy Wells, halfback for Michigan State (1954 Rose Bowl MVP) and in the NFL (1954-50), at age 70
- December 31 - Marie Hartwig, University of Michigan physical education professor and first associate athletic director for women, at age 95

== See also ==
- 2001 in the United States
