= Michigan State University student riots =

Student riots in Michigan, United States

Notable Michigan State University student riots occurred during the late 1990s and early 2000s (decade). The most recent riot occurred in 2021.

== 1999 riot ==
A riot took place on and around the campus of Michigan State University in East Lansing, Michigan on the night of March 27, 1999. Following a loss by MSU's basketball team to Duke University in the NCAA Final Four, between 5,000 and 10,000 students and non-students gathered throughout the outside of campus. Later assessments of damages range from $250,000 to near $500,000. 132 people were arrested, including 71 students.

A number of news media organizations captured footage of the riot. The Ingham County prosecutor's office issued subpoenas for this footage; the Lansing State Journal refused to comply and ten other organizations followed suit. Michigan's shield law was at issue. The case wound its way through the state court system. In September 2000 the Michigan Supreme Court upheld their right to withhold the recordings.

As a result of this riot, a state law was passed giving judges the discretion to bar students convicted of rioting from public colleges for up to two years.

== Riots in 1998, 2005, 2013, 2019 and 2021 ==
Though the March 27, 1999, incident was the most serious of the campus riots during this time, it was not the first or last incidence of civil disturbance:

=== May 1, 1998 ===
An estimated 3,000 students protested the ban on alcohol at Munn Field tailgate parties, resulting in police firing tear gas at the crowd. The gathering was planned in advance by an email spread through the student body email system asking students to gather and protest the ban. The university police informed students, via the school newspaper, that anyone on Munn Field would be arrested for trespassing. One student crossed the fence and was arrested by campus police. Following the arrest, an anonymous man crossed the fence and was seen taunting the crowd. Shortly, 30-40 students crossed the fence. When the remaining students saw the police would be unable to arrest everyone, approximately 1,500 students poured over the fence onto Munn field. The students played football, frisbee, and played in the rain and mud. Some had even mooned the police. The police then tear-gassed the students, causing them to leave and go to the University President's (M. Peter McPherson) house. When the students had learned the President was not available, they then relocated to Grand River Ave, where a small riot ensued.

=== April 2, 2005 ===
An estimated 2,000 students and non-students took to the streets immediately following the MSU men's basketball team's loss to UNC in the NCAA Final Four. An estimated $8,275 in damage to the city of East Lansing and an estimated $190,389 in expenses to the area law enforcement was caused by the riots. The April 2nd event was marked by accusations of police abuse and mismanagement. Though large segments of the disturbance were documented on video, no specific acts of violence were seen until after tear gas was launched at students. The City Council formed a commission to review the events and declined to assess blame to the students and police by a 5–4 vote.

=== December 8, 2013 ===
After a win against rival Ohio State University in the Big Ten Championship Game, over 3,000 students and non-students gathered in Cedar Village Apartments in East Lansing to celebrate MSU football's qualification for the 100th Rose Bowl. Participants chanted "I smell roses" and "go green, go white". Students burned couches, coats, tables, trees, and any furniture that they could find. A car was also flipped. However, the student body created a fund for a new car for the fellow Spartan and raised well above the car's value. Police marched away from the main couch fire, causing hundreds of students to follow singing "Nah, nah, nah... goodbye." The riots lasted well over 2 hours. Police in riot gear eventually dispersed the crowd. The East Lansing Police Department made a controversial decision, receiving criticism, by offering $20,000 for information about the students who were at Cedar Village. The police department also tried to pursue charges against a student who held a "Burn The Couch" sign during the football game, which occurred legally outside of their jurisdiction.

=== March 31, 2019 ===
Students on campus celebrated after the MSU men's basketball team defeated top overall seed Duke in the NCAA tournament to reach the Final Four. At Cedar Village, bon fires were lit in the parking lot and a chair was burned, resulting in multiple arrests.

=== October 30, 2021 ===
Students overturned at least one car and burned mattresses and couches following MSU football's victory over University of Michigan.
