= Patricia Shontz =

American economist

Patricia Shontz (1933–1998, also known as Patricia J. Shontz, Patricia O. Shontz, Patricia Shontz Longe, and Patricia Longe) was an American economist, columnist, businesswoman, and academic.

== Education and career ==
Shontz was born in Milwaukee in 1933, graduated summa cum laude from the University of Detroit Mercy in 1955, and went to Wayne State University for graduate study, earning an M.B.A. in 1956 and a Ph.D. in 1963; her dissertation was Some Aspects of the Detroit Banking Crisis. She worked as an assistant professor at the University of Windsor from 1963 to 1966, when she became a columnist for the Detroit News. She was president of the Detroit chapter of the American Statistical Association in 1970.

By 1973 she had left her newspaper column and was a director of the Manufacturers National Bank of Detroit and of Manufacturers National Corporation. She became a professor of business administration at the University of Michigan, and was awarded tenure there in 1976. She was chair of the university's Senate Advisory Committee on Financial Affairs in 1978, when anti-apartheid protestors who wished the university to divest from South Africa accused her of having a conflict of interest because of her bank ties. In 1978 she was elected as the first female director of the American Motors Corporation, and by 1983 she was an outside director of six corporations.

As well as her work at the University of Michigan, Shontz did consulting work as a principal for The Longe Company. By 1997 she had retired from her faculty position. She continued to serve on corporate boards of directors, including one at Comerica, one of only 18 directorial seats held by women in Michigan-based Fortune 500 companies. She retired from the Comerica board in March 1998, and died in Naples, Florida on August 16, 1998.

== Recognition ==
In 1970, Shontz became the winner of the Gerald Loeb Award for Distinguished Business and Financial Journalism, the first winner in the editorial category. In 1977 the University of Detroit Mercy gave Shontz an honorary doctorate, and in the same year she was elected as a Fellow of the American Statistical Association.
