= 1998 Michigan elections =

- November 3, 1998

The 1998 Michigan elections were held in the U.S. state of Michigan on November 3, 1998. The state primary was held on August 4.

== Federal ==
=== U.S. House of Representatives ===
All incumbents were re-elected. This preserved the 10–6 Democratic majority in Michigan's U.S. House delegation.

== Executive ==
=== Governor and lieutenant governor ===
Incumbent Republican governor John Engler was re-elected, defeating Democratic nominee Geoffrey Fieger.

=== Secretary of state ===
Incumbent Republican secretary of state Candice Miller was re-elected, defeating Democratic nominee Mary Lou Parks.

=== Attorney general ===
Incumbent Democratic attorney general Frank J. Kelley decided not to run for re-election. Democratic nominee Jennifer Granholm was elected, defeating Republican nominee John Smietanka.

== Legislature ==
=== Senate ===
Republicans gained one seat, resulting an increased majority of 23–15 over the Democrats in the chamber.

=== House of Representatives ===
The Republicans won a 58–52 majority in the state House from what was previously a Democratic 58–52 majority.

=== House of Representatives special election ===
A special primary election in the state House for the 32nd district was held on February 3, 1998, with the special general election being held on February 24. The vacancy was caused by the election of Republican State Rep. David Jaye to the state Senate in December 1997. Republican Alan Sanborn was elected to fill the vacancy left by Jaye's resignation.

== Judiciary ==
=== Supreme Court ===
There were three Michigan Supreme Court seats up for election on November 3, 1998. Two were for full terms, and one was for a two-year partial term. The two-year term was up for election due to the resignation of Democrat Dorothy Comstock Riley in September 1997. Governor John Engler appointed Republican Clifford Taylor to fill her vacancy. Incumbent Democratic justice Patricia Boyle decided not to run for re-election. Before the election, the Democrats held a 4–3 majority on the court.

In the general election, incumbents Democrat Michael Cavanagh and Republican Clifford Taylor retained their seats. In the open seat left by Boyle, Republican Maura D. Corrigan was elected. This resulted in a 4–3 Republican majority on the court.

== Michigan State Board of Education and University boards ==
=== Michigan State Board of Education ===
Incumbents Republican Gary Wolfram and Democrat Barbara Roberts Mason were defeated in their attempt at re-election. The election was won by Republican Eileen Wisner and Democrat Sharon Gire. This left the board with a 4–4 Democrat-Republican split.

=== Michigan State University Board of Trustees ===
Incumbent Republican John D. Shingleton did not run for re-election. The election was won by incumbent Republican Dee Cook and Republican David Porteous. This maintained the 5–3 Democratic majority on the board.

=== University of Michigan Board of Regents ===
Incumbent Republican Shirley McFee did not run for re-election. Incumbent Democrat Philip Power was defeated in his attempt at re-election. The election was won by Republican David Brandon and Democrat Kathy White. This maintained the 5–3 Democratic majority on the board.

=== Wayne State University Board of Governors ===
Incumbent Republicans Elizabeth Hardy and Vernice Davis-Anthony sought re-election. Hardy was re-elected, but Davis-Anthony was defeated by Democrat John F. Kelly. This increased the Democratic majority on the board to 6–2 over the Republicans.

== Ballot initiatives ==
=== State ballot proposals ===
There were three state ballot proposals voted upon on November 3, 1998. Proposal A, which sought to change the word "handicapped" to "disabled" in the Michigan Constitution, was approved. Proposal B, which sought to legalize assisted suicide, was rejected. Proposal 3, which sought to authorize the selling of bonds for state environmental projects, was approved.
