= Dwight E. Beach =

United States Army general

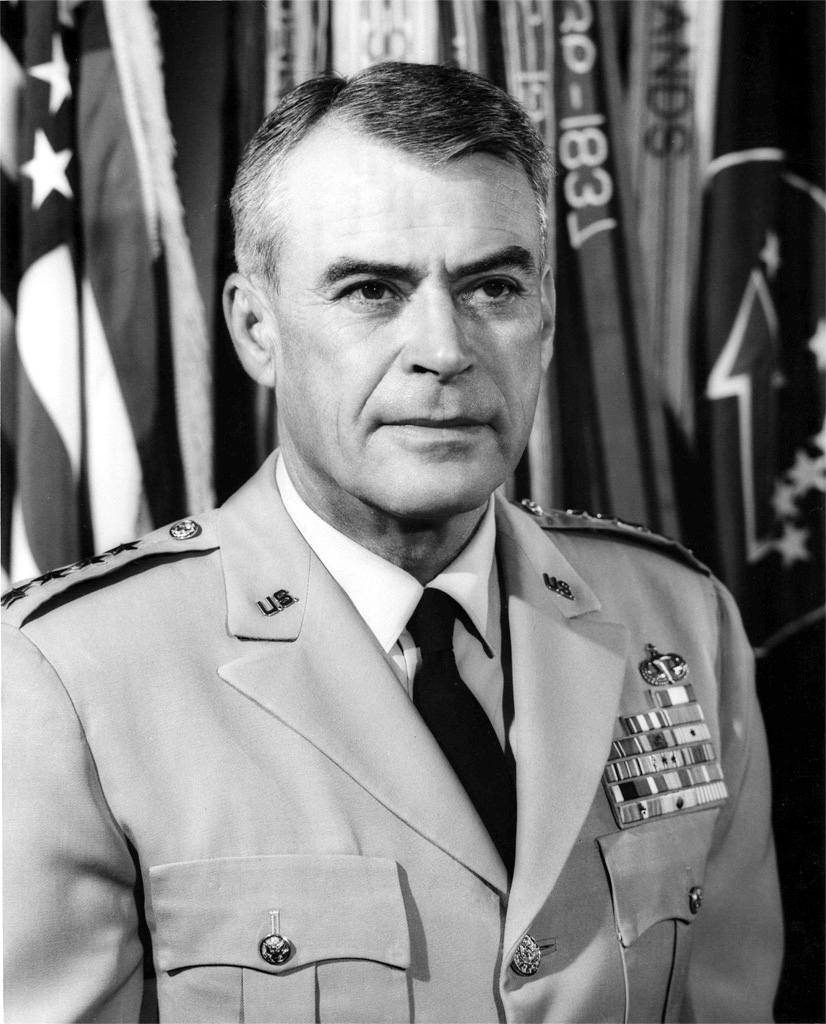
- General Dwight E. Beach
- Born: 20 July 1908; Chelsea, Michigan, US
- Died: 22 July 2000 (aged 92); Lima Township, Michigan, US
- Education: University of Michigan
- Military career
- Allegiance: United States
- Branch: United States Army
- Service years: 1932–1968
- Rank: General
- Commands: United Nations Command; United States Army Pacific; 82nd Airborne Division
- Conflicts: World War II; Korean War; Cold War
- Awards: Distinguished Service Medal (2); Silver Star; Legion of Merit; Bronze Star

General Dwight Edward Beach (20 July 1908 – 22 July 2000) commanded the United States Forces Korea from 1965 to 1966 and U.S. Army, Pacific from September 1966 to July 1968. He gained his commission in 1932 into the Field Artillery. He served in World War II in the Pacific theater, participating in four amphibious assaults, as well as in the Korean War.

== Biography ==
Beach was born in Chelsea, Michigan, on 20 July 1908, and attended the University of Michigan for two years before transferring and graduating from the United States Military Academy. Prior to transferring to West Point, he was initiated into the Sigma Chi fraternity. He also attended the Armed Forces Staff College and the Army War College, and was later an instructor of tactics at West Point.

Major command assignments for Beach include Commanding General, 45th Infantry Division, of the Eighth Army in Korea in 1954. Later he served as Commanding General for the 82nd Airborne Division at Fort Bragg. During the escalation of U.S. involvement in Vietnam, he served as Commanding General for the U.S. Army Combat Developments Command in Fort Belvoir, Virginia, and then as Commander in Chief of the United Nations Command, Commander of U.S. Forces in Korea and Commanding General of the Eighth Army in Korea.

Additional major duty assignments for Beach were Deputy Chief of Staff and Chief of Staff for the Eighth Army in Korea, and Director of Special Weapons Development at Fort Bliss, Texas. He later served as Deputy Chief and Chief of Research and Development for the Department of the Army in Washington, D.C.

He retired from the Army on 1 August 1968. He was married to the former Florence Eileen Clem (1912–1995) in 1932, and had five children. He died in Lima Township, Michigan, at the 147-year-old Beach Farm.

== Awards and decoration ==
Awards and decorations for General Beach include the Army Distinguished Service Medal, the Silver Star, the Legion of Merit, the Bronze Star, the World War II Victory Medal, the Occupation of Japan Medal, the Korean Service Medal, the United Nations Service Medal, and the Philippine Liberation Ribbon.

- Distinguished Service Medal with Oak Leaf Cluster
- Silver Star
- Legion of Merit
- Bronze Star
- World War II Victory Medal
- Army of Occupation Medal with Japan clasp
- Korean Service Medal
- United Nations Service Medal for Korea
- Philippine Liberation Medal

Dwight E. Beach Middle School, in Chelsea, Michigan, is named for him.
