= 2000 Michigan elections =

- November 7, 2000

The 2000 Michigan elections were held in the U.S. state of Michigan on November 7, 2000. The presidential primary was held on February 22. The state primary was held on August 8.

== Federal ==
=== Presidential primaries and caucuses ===
The presidential primary elections were held on February 22. John McCain won the Republican primary in Michigan. George W. Bush won the Republican nomination nationally.

Lyndon LaRouche was the sole candidate on the ballot in the Democratic presidential primary. LaRouche was not recognized by the Democratic Party. There were more uncommitted votes than votes for LaRouche. The Democrats chose their nominee through a caucus instead of a primary election. The caucus was held on March 11. Al Gore won the Michigan caucus, and was nominated nationally.

The Reform Party held a presidential primary election in Michigan. Donald Trump, who had dropped out of the race, was the only candidate on the ballot. The Reform Party presidential nomination was disputed between Pat Buchanan and John Hagelin. After a court decided against allowing either Buchanan or Hagelin on the November Michigan ballot as the Reform presidential candidate, Buchanan ran a write-in campaign, and Hagelin appeared on the ballot as the Natural Law Party candidate.

=== Presidential general election ===
Democratic nominee Al Gore won Michigan in the presidential general election. All 18 of Michigan's electoral votes went to Gore. Republican nominee George W. Bush won the presidency nationally.

=== U.S. Senate ===
Democratic nominee Debbie Stabenow defeated incumbent Republican senator Spencer Abraham.

=== U.S. House of Representatives ===
Republicans gained one seat in Michigan the 2000 U.S. House race, resulting in a 9–7 Democratic majority in Michigan's U.S. House delegation.

== Legislature ==
=== House of Representatives ===
Republicans maintained their 58–52 majority over the Democrats in the chamber.

== Judiciary ==
=== Supreme Court ===
There were three Michigan Supreme Court seats up for election on November 7, 2000. One was a full term, while two were partial terms. Of the partial terms, one was a two-year term, and the other was a four-year term. The two-year term was up for election due to the resignation of Democrat Conrad L. Mallett Jr. Governor John Engler appointed Republican Robert P. Young Jr. to replace Mallett on the state supreme court. The four-year term was up for election due to the resignation of Republican James H. Brickley. Republican Stephen Markman was appointed by Governor Engler to replace Brickley. The appointments left the Republicans with a 5–2 majority over the Democrats on the court before the 2000 election.

Incumbent Republican appointees Young and Markman were elected to their partial terms. Incumbent Republican Clifford Taylor was re-elected for a full term. This maintained the 5–2 Republican majority on the court.

== Michigan State Board of Education and University Boards ==
=== Michigan State Board of Education ===
Incumbent Democrat Kathleen N. Straus ran for re-election, while incumbent Republican Dorothy Beardmore decided not to. The election was won by Straus and Democrat John Austin, resulting in a 5–3 Democratic majority on the board.

=== Michigan State University Board of Trustees ===
Incumbents Democrat Dorothy Gonzales and Republican Scott Romney won re-election, maintaining a 4–4 Democrat-Republican split on the board.

=== University of Michigan Board of Regents ===
Incumbent Democrats Larry Deitch and Rebecca McGowan won re-election, maintaining a 5–3 Democratic majority on the board.

=== Wayne State University Board of Governors ===
Neither of the incumbent Democrats, Edgar Scribner and Denise Lewis, decided to run for re-election. The election was won by Democrats Paul Massaron and Jackie Washington, preserving the 6–2 Democratic majority on the board.

== Ballot initiatives ==
=== State ballot proposals ===
There were two state ballot proposals voted upon on November 7, 2000. Both were rejected. Proposal 1 would have required specific poorly performing school districts to offer vouchers to students to attend private schools. It would have also allowed local school boards or voters in school districts to make similar requirements. Proposal 2 sought to require a two-thirds vote in the Michigan Legislature before it could pass any laws affecting local governments.

== Local elections ==
The following is an incomplete list of 2000 elections in notable localities.

=== Oakland County Executive election ===
Incumbent Oakland County Executive L. Brooks Patterson won re-election.
