= 1998 Michigan gubernatorial election =

- November 3, 1998
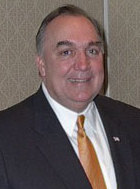

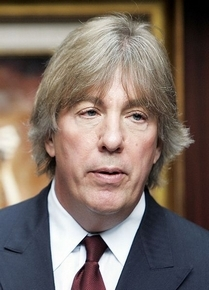
Nominee	John Engler	Geoffrey Fieger
Party	Republican	Democratic
Running mate	Dick Posthumus	Jim Agee
Popular vote	1,883,005	1,143,574
Percentage	62.20%	37.78%
- County results Engler: 50–60% 60–70% 70–80% 80–90% Fieger: 50–60%
Governor before election
John Engler
Republican
Elected Governor
John Engler
Republican

The 1998 Michigan gubernatorial election was held on November 3, 1998, to elect the governor and lieutenant governor of Michigan. Republican incumbent John Engler was re-elected to a third term in office over Democratic lawyer Geoffrey Fieger in a landslide.

Engler won the Republican nomination against token opposition. Fieger, who was best known for representing the assisted suicide advocate Jack Kevorkian, funded his own successful campaign for the Democratic nomination and defeated East Lansing mayor Larry Owen and former state senator Doug Ross.

As of 2026, this was the last time Genesee County and Washtenaw County voted for the Republican gubernatorial candidate.

== Background ==
Although Michigan voters had passed a ballot measure in 1992 limiting governors to two terms in office, it was not retroactive and counted only towards people taking office in or after 1993. As Engler had first taken office in 1991, his first term did not count towards the two-term limit, and he was allowed to run for a third term.

== Republican primary ==
=== Candidates ===
- Gary Artinian
- John Engler, incumbent governor of Michigan since 1991

=== Campaign ===
Engler, a two-term incumbent, faced token opposition in the Republican primary, winning re-nomination with almost 90 percent of the vote. Following lieutenant governor Connie Binsfeld's decision to not seek a third term, Michigan Senate majority leader Dick Posthumus received the Republican nomination for lieutenant governor.

=== Results ===
Results by county Engler: 70–80%; 80–90%; >90%

Republican primary results
Party	Candidate	Votes	%
Republican	John Engler (inc.)	477,628	89.60%
Republican	Gary Artinian	55,453	10.40%
Total votes		533,081	100.00%

== Democratic primary ==
=== Candidates ===
- Geoffrey Fieger, attorney known for representing Jack Kevorkian
- Larry Owen, former mayor of East Lansing
- Doug Ross, former state senator from Oak Park

=== Candidates ===
Early in the race, Owen was considered the front runner. But due to Fieger's notoriety and personal wealth, he surpassed his opponents. He ended up spending almost $6 million of his own money in the race. Fieger won a close race, taking 41 percent of the vote. State representative Jim Agee, after securing the support from the Michigan Education Association was picked by Fieger to be his running mate, over Fieger's initial preferred choice, state representative Candace Curtis.

=== Results ===
Results by county Fieger: 30–40%; 40–50%; 50–60%; Owen: 30–40%; 40–50%; 50–60%; 60–70%; Ross: 30–40%

Democratic primary results
Party	Candidate	Votes	%
Democratic	Geoffrey Fieger	300,458	41.18%
Democratic	Larry Owen	272,360	37.33%
Democratic	Doug Ross	156,847	21.50%
Total votes		729,665	100.00%

== General election ==
=== Candidates ===
- John Engler, incumbent governor of Michigan since 1991 (Republican)
- Geoffrey Fieger, attorney known for representing Jack Kevorkian (Democratic)

=== Polling ===
Poll source	Date(s)	Sample size (Note: Key: A – all adults RV – registered voters LV – likely voters V – unclear)	Margin of error	John Engler (R)	Geoffrey Fieger (D)	Other / undecided (Note: Calculated by taking the difference of 100% and all other candidates combined.)
Harris Insights & Analytics	October 30, 1998	1,855	—	62%	38%	0%
Mitchell Research & Communications	October 21, 1998	600	—	62%	30%	8%
Harris Insights & Analytics	October 20, 1998	1,535	—	51%	36%	13%
EPIC/MRA (Note: Poll sponsored by the Detroit Free Press)	September 29 – October 1, 1998	600 (LV)	± 3.7%	54%	22%	24%
Mitchell Research & Communications, Inc.	September 21–23, 1998	400 (RV)	± 5.5%	61%	24%	15%
Mitchell Research & Communication Inc. (Note: Poll sponsored by The Detroit News)	September 10–13, 1998	400 (RV)	± 5.0%	60%	21%	19%
EPIC/MRA	August 20–24, 1998	600 (A)	± 4.0%	55%	31%	14%
EPIC/MRA	August 6, 1998	(A)	± 4.0%	53%	33%	24%

=== Results ===
1998 Michigan gubernatorial election
Party	Candidate	Votes	%	±%
Republican	John Engler (incumbent)	1,883,005	62.20%	+0.73%
Democratic	Geoffrey Fieger	1,143,574	37.78%	−0.69%
	Terry Link (write-in)	399	0.01%	
	Carl Humphrey (write-in)	36	0.00%	
	Vicki Foreback (write-in)	32	0.00%	
	Marc Katz (write-in)	20	0.00%	
	Robert Marek (write-in)	17	0.00%	
	Michael Wagonlander (write-in)	12	0.00%	
	Johnni Matthew III (write-in)	9	0.00%	
Majority		739,431	24.43%	
Total votes		3,027,104	100.00%	
Republican hold		Swing	+1.42%	

==== Results by county ====
County	John Engler Republican		Geoffrey Fieger Democratic		Scattering Write-in		Margin		Total votes cast
County	#	%	#	%	#	%	#	%	Total votes cast
Alcona	2,951	69.22%	1,312	30.78%	0	0.00%	1,639	38.45%	4,263
Alger	1,794	56.92%	1,358	43.08%	0	0.00%	436	13.83%	3,152
Allegan	24,141	77.76%	6,896	22.23%	4	0.01%	17,225	55.53%	31,021
Alpena	7,267	65.75%	3,785	34.24%	1	0.01%	3,482	31.50%	11,053
Antrim	5,748	68.52%	2,641	31.48%	0	0.00%	3,107	37.04%	8,389
Arenac	3,179	58.98%	2,210	41.00%	1	0.02%	969	17.98%	5,390
Baraga	1,338	53.63%	1,157	46.37%	0	0.00%	181	7.25%	2,495
Barry	13,148	71.43%	5,259	28.57%	0	0.00%	7,889	42.86%	18,407
Bay	23,343	60.83%	15,017	39.14%	12	0.03%	8,326	21.70%	38,372
Benzie	3,726	62.81%	2,206	37.19%	0	0.00%	1,520	25.62%	5,932
Berrien	30,380	73.47%	10,971	26.53%	0	0.00%	19,409	46.94%	41,351
Branch	7,623	70.32%	3,216	29.67%	1	0.01%	4,407	40.65%	10,840
Calhoun	25,955	67.20%	12,661	32.78%	5	0.01%	13,294	34.42%	38,621
Cass	9,177	72.75%	3,438	27.25%	0	0.00%	5,739	45.49%	12,615
Charlevoix	6,290	69.26%	2,792	30.74%	0	0.00%	3,498	38.52%	9,082
Cheboygan	6,036	67.74%	2,875	32.26%	0	0.00%	3,161	35.47%	8,911
Chippewa	6,613	61.27%	4,180	38.73%	0	0.00%	2,433	22.54%	10,793
Clare	5,649	61.34%	3,561	38.66%	0	0.00%	2,088	22.67%	9,210
Clinton	17,696	73.81%	6,222	25.95%	56	0.23%	11,474	47.86%	23,974
Crawford	3,051	62.49%	1,831	37.51%	0	0.00%	1,220	24.99%	4,882
Delta	7,410	59.33%	5,080	40.67%	0	0.00%	2,330	18.65%	12,490
Dickinson	6,183	62.96%	3,638	37.04%	0	0.00%	2,545	25.91%	9,821
Eaton	24,778	68.41%	11,436	31.57%	8	0.02%	13,342	36.83%	36,222
Emmet	7,765	73.79%	2,758	26.21%	0	0.00%	5,007	47.58%	10,523
Genesee	69,799	51.17%	66,608	48.83%	10	0.01%	3,191	2.34%	136,417
Gladwin	5,573	63.69%	3,177	36.31%	0	0.00%	2,396	27.38%	8,750
Gogebic	3,020	50.97%	2,905	49.03%	0	0.00%	115	1.94%	5,925
Grand Traverse	20,462	71.63%	8,101	28.36%	2	0.01%	12,361	43.27%	28,565
Gratiot	7,998	71.14%	3,245	28.86%	0	0.00%	4,753	42.28%	11,243
Hillsdale	9,027	73.05%	3,325	26.91%	5	0.04%	5,702	46.14%	12,357
Houghton	6,443	60.92%	4,131	39.06%	2	0.02%	2,312	21.86%	10,576
Huron	9,264	76.14%	2,902	23.85%	1	0.01%	6,362	52.29%	12,167
Ingham	53,905	60.13%	35,584	39.70%	151	0.17%	18,321	20.44%	89,640
Ionia	12,324	71.15%	4,996	28.85%	0	0.00%	7,328	42.31%	17,320
Iosco	6,457	66.49%	3,252	33.49%	2	0.02%	3,205	33.00%	9,711
Iron	2,715	54.33%	2,282	45.67%	0	0.00%	433	8.67%	4,997
Isabella	9,423	63.74%	5,361	36.26%	0	0.00%	4,062	27.48%	14,784
Jackson	31,330	67.29%	15,229	32.71%	2	0.00%	16,101	34.58%	46,561
Kalamazoo	46,443	67.58%	22,275	32.41%	6	0.01%	24,168	35.17%	68,724
Kalkaska	3,155	63.11%	1,844	36.89%	0	0.00%	1,311	26.23%	4,999
Kent	133,120	76.58%	40,709	23.42%	8	0.00%	92,411	53.16%	173,837
Keweenaw	566	56.26%	440	43.74%	0	0.00%	126	12.52%	1,006
Lake	1,832	53.49%	1,593	46.51%	0	0.00%	239	6.98%	3,425
Lapeer	17,382	65.62%	9,106	34.38%	1	0.00%	8,276	31.24%	26,489
Leelanau	6,577	70.86%	2,705	29.14%	0	0.00%	3,872	41.72%	9,282
Lenawee	18,137	63.35%	10,494	36.65%	0	0.00%	7,643	26.69%	28,631
Livingston	37,458	73.82%	13,283	26.18%	2	0.00%	24,175	47.64%	50,743
Luce	1,130	57.98%	819	42.02%	0	0.00%	311	15.96%	1,949
Mackinac	6,054	64.70%	1,666	35.30%	0	0.00%	1,388	29.41%	4,720
Macomb	166,920	67.48%	80,438	32.52%	18	0.01%	86,482	34.96%	247,376
Manistee	5,493	62.85%	3,247	37.15%	0	0.00%	2,246	25.70%	8,740
Marquette	11,157	51.61%	10,460	48.39%	0	0.00%	697	3.22%	21,617
Mason	6,391	66.10%	3,277	33.90%	0	0.00%	3,114	32.21%	9,668
Mecosta	7,065	67.21%	3,446	32.78%	1	0.01%	3,619	34.43%	10,512
Menominee	4,579	65.70%	2,391	34.30%	0	0.00%	2,188	31.39%	6,970
Midland	20,737	73.58%	7,445	26.42%	0	0.00%	13,292	47.16%	28,182
Missaukee	3,629	72.78%	1,357	27.22%	0	0.00%	2,272	45.57%	4,986
Monroe	26,690	64.95%	14,401	35.05%	0	0.00%	12,289	29.91%	41,091
Montcalm	11,069	68.64%	5,058	31.36%	0	0.00%	6,011	37.27%	16,127
Montmorency	2,499	64.99%	1,346	35.01%	0	0.00%	1,153	29.99%	3,845
Muskegon	29,660	60.54%	19,331	39.46%	2	0.00%	10,329	21.08%	48,993
Newaygo	9,776	69.00%	4,392	31.00%	0	0.00%	5,384	38.00%	14,168
Oakland	264,551	66.32%	134,215	33.65%	120	0.03%	130,336	32.67%	398,886
Oceana	5,231	67.49%	2,520	32.51%	0	0.00%	2,711	34.98%	7,751
Ogemaw	4,796	62.33%	2,899	37.67%	0	0.00%	1,897	24.65%	7,695
Ontonagon	1,553	51.84%	1,442	48.13%	1	0.03%	111	3.70%	2,996
Osceola	4,918	66.46%	2,482	33.54%	0	0.00%	2,436	32.92%	7,400
Oscoda	2,017	64.90%	1,091	35.10%	0	0.00%	926	29.79%	3,108
Otsego	5,525	71.57%	2,195	28.43%	0	0.00%	3,330	43.13%	7,720
Ottawa	67,054	85.40%	11,451	14.58%	9	0.01%	55,603	70.82%	78,514
Presque Isle	3,871	67.09%	1,899	32.91%	0	0.00%	1,972	34.18%	5,770
Roscommon	6,320	63.66%	3,608	36.34%	0	0.00%	2,712	27.32%	9,928
Saginaw	43,766	63.44%	25,213	36.55%	9	0.01%	18,553	26.89%	68,988
Sanilac	9,941	71.15%	4,023	28.79%	8	0.06%	5,918	42.36%	13,972
Schoolcraft	1,594	55.52%	1,277	44.48%	0	0.00%	317	11.04%	2,871
Shiawassee	16,465	66.31%	8,347	33.62%	18	0.07%	8,118	32.69%	24,830
St. Clair	32,299	64.18%	18,025	35.82%	0	0.00%	14,274	28.36%	50,324
St. Joseph	11,026	74.86%	3,703	25.14%	0	0.00%	7,323	49.72%	14,729
Tuscola	12,074	66.70%	6,027	33.30%	0	0.00%	6,047	33.41%	18,101
Van Buren	13,715	67.85%	6,499	32.15%	0	0.00%	7,216	35.70%	20,214
Washtenaw	53,227	57.03%	40,078	42.94%	32	0.03%	13,149	14.09%	93,337
Wayne	243,235	42.85%	324,351	57.14%	17	0.00%	-81,116	-14.29%	567,603
Wexford	6,347	67.06%	3,108	32.84%	10	0.11%	3,239	34.22%	9,465
Total	1,883,005	62.20%	1,143,574	37.78%	525	0.02%	739,431	24.43%	3,027,104

===== Counties that flipped from Democratic to Republican =====
- Genesee

== Notes ==
Partisan clients
