= Keith Miller (infielder) =

American baseball player (born 1963)

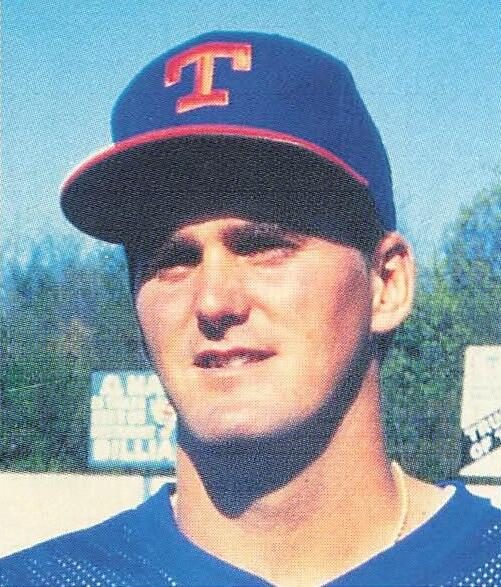
- Miller with the Tidewater Tides c. 1988
- Infielder
- Born: June 12, 1963 (age 63); Midland, Michigan, U.S.
- Batted: Right Threw: Right

MLB debut
- June 16, 1987, for the New York Mets

Last MLB appearance
- May 13, 1995, for the Kansas City Royals

MLB statistics
- Batting average: .262
- Home runs: 12
- Runs batted in: 92
- Stats at Baseball Reference

Teams
- New York Mets (1987–1991); Kansas City Royals (1992–1995)
Medals
Baseball
Representing the United States
Pan American Games
Bronze medal – third place	1983 Caracas	Team

Keith Alan Miller (born June 12, 1963) is an American former professional baseball player who played in Major League Baseball as an infielder for the New York Mets and Kansas City Royals from 1987 to 1995.

== College ==
After leading All Saints Central High School to a baseball state championship in 1981, Miller was selected in the 24th round of the 1981 Major League Baseball draft by the Cleveland Indians, but opted to attended Oral Roberts University, instead. He was drafted in the second round of the 1984 Major League Baseball draft by the New York Yankees for $75,000, however, the contract was voided when the Yankees were made aware of a knee injury Miller suffered at ORU. He signed with the New York Mets as an amateur free agent in September 1984 for $50,000.

== New York Mets ==
Miller was a second baseman with some experience at third when he came up with the Mets in June of 1987. He went 2-for-4 with a run scored in his major league debut on his way to hits in each of his first seven games. At the end of the month, he was optioned back to triple A Tidewater with a .366 average. He came back up that September, and went 4-for-10. Overall, he batted .373.

He began the season again with the Tidewater Tides in 1988, but joined the Mets by late May. He wasn't as successful as he was the previous season, going 0-for his first-10. He hit his first career home run on July 1 off the Houston Astros' Jim Deshaies, and went 3-for-6 in the extra innings loss to bring his average above .200 for the first time all season. He ended the season with a .214 average, the one home run and five runs batted in. On October 1, he made his debut as an outfielder. He handled the one ball hit to him (a line out by Tom Pagnozzi) cleanly.

His 1989 season mirrored the previous season; he was called up from Tidewater in late May, and batted .231 with one home run and seven RBIs. In September, he began seeing more playing time in the outfield, and actually began the 1990 season as the Mets' starting center fielder. That idea was pretty much abandoned after the Mets acquired Daryl Boston from the Chicago White Sox, however, 1990 turned out to be the one full season of Miller's career in which he logged more innings in the outfield (423.1) than the infield (69). His best season as a Met turned out to be 1991, when he batted .280 with four home runs and 23 RBIs, all career highs to that point.

== Kansas City Royals ==
At the Winter Meetings, he was part of a blockbuster deal in which he, Gregg Jefferies and Kevin McReynolds were traded to the Kansas City Royals for two time Cy Young Award winner Bret Saberhagen and infielder Bill Pecota.

The 1992 Royals got off to an 0–7 start. They were being no hit by Miller's former Mets teammate Ron Darling (now with the Oakland Athletics) in the eighth game of the season until Miller led off the eighth with a single. Darling was pulled from the game after that play, and replaced by Rick Honeycutt. The Royals rallied for three runs off Honeycutt for their first win of the season. Miller was in left field that day, but he was shifted back to his natural position at second base by the end of April to replace the slumping Terry Shumpert. His first season in Kansas City, Miller had a career year. Batting lead off or in the number two hole for most of the season, he batted .284 and tied his career high four home runs. He also had career highs in games (106) runs (57) and RBIs (38).

During the off-season, the Royals dealt Jeffries to the St. Louis Cardinals, and shifted Miller to third. The 1993 season got off to a rough start for Miller. After injuring himself running out a fly ball in the first game of the season, Miller went into an 0-for-25 slump. He was batting .163 when he was sent down to triple A Omaha in the beginning of June. He returned in late August in a far more limited role, and batted .179 the rest of the way.

Miller played just twenty games in 1994 due to injury. In fifteen games at Omaha, he batted .184 with three RBIs. He went 2-for-15 in five major league games with one run scored. After a similarly limited 1995 season, he retired.

== Career statistics ==
Games	PA	AB	Runs	Hits	2B	3B	HR	RBI	SB	BB	SO	Avg.	OBP	Slg.	OPS	Fld%
465	1468	1326	190	347	67	8	12	92	63	100	205	.262	.323	.351	.675	.965

His experience with the Yankees as a young athlete inspired Miller to become a sports agent. Among his notable clients with Aces Inc. are David Wright, Brandon Inge and Scott Rolen.
