= Howard Wolpe =

American politician

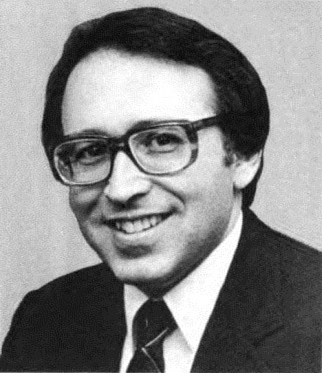

Member of the U.S. House of Representatives from Michigan's 3rd district
- In office January 3, 1979 – January 3, 1993
- Preceded by: Garry Brown
- Succeeded by: Fred Upton (redistricting)

Member of the Michigan House of Representatives from the 46th district
- In office January 1, 1973 – December 31, 1976
- Preceded by: William V. Weber
- Succeeded by: Mary Brown

Personal details
- Born: Howard Eliot Wolpe; November 3, 1939 Los Angeles, California, U.S.
- Died: October 25, 2011 (aged 71) Saugatuck, Michigan, U.S.
- Party: Democratic
- Spouse: Judy Wolpe (deceased 2006)
- Education: Reed College (BA); Massachusetts Institute of Technology (MA, PhD)

Howard Eliot Wolpe (November 3, 1939 – October 25, 2011) was an American politician who served as a seven-term U.S. representative from Michigan and presidential special envoy to the African Great Lakes Region in the Clinton administration, where he led the United States delegation to the Arusha and Lusaka peace talks, which aimed to end civil wars in Burundi and the Democratic Republic of the Congo. He returned to the U.S. State Department as Special Advisor to the Secretary for Africa's Great Lakes Region. Previously, he had served as Director of the Africa Program at the Woodrow Wilson International Center for Scholars, and of the center's Project on Leadership and Building State Capacity. While at the center, Wolpe directed post-conflict leadership training programs in Burundi, the Democratic Republic of the Congo and Liberia.

A specialist in African politics for 10 of his 14 years in the Congress, Wolpe chaired the Subcommittee on Africa of the House Foreign Affairs Committee. As chair of the House Africa Subcommittee, Wolpe co-authored (with Rep. Ron Dellums and others) and managed legislation that imposed sanctions against South Africa, by over-riding President Ronald Reagan's veto of that sanctions legislation (the Comprehensive Anti-Apartheid Act of 1986). He also authored and managed the passage of the African Famine Recovery and Development Act, -- a comprehensive rewrite in the 1980s of America's approach to development assistance in Africa that included the creation of the African Development Fund.

Wolpe represented a district that stretched from his home in Kalamazoo to the more Democratic portions of Lansing. In 1992, Wolpe's district was eliminated, and most of its territory, including his home, was merged with the district of three-term Republican Fred Upton. Although Kalamazoo was the largest city in the reconfigured district, it was geographically more Upton's district than Wolpe's, prompting Wolpe to retire.

Prior to entering the U.S. Congress, Wolpe served in the Michigan House of Representatives and as a member of the Kalamazoo City Commission. In 1994, he won the Democratic nomination for Governor of Michigan. He initially asked former First Lady of Michigan Helen Milliken to be his running mate, but Milliken declined his offer. Wolpe then selected one of his former rivals in the Democratic primary, State Senator Debbie Stabenow (later a U.S. Senator), as his nominee for lieutenant governor. The Wolpe-Stabenow ticket lost the general election in a landslide to incumbent Governor John Engler and Lieutenant Governor Connie Binsfeld.

Wolpe taught at Western Michigan University (Political Science Department), Michigan State University where he co-published a volume on modernization in Nigeria, and the University of Michigan (Institute of Public Policy Studies), and served as a visiting fellow in the Foreign Policy Studies Program of the Brookings Institution, as a Woodrow Wilson Center Public Policy Scholar, and as a consultant to the World Bank and to the Foreign Service Institute of the U.S. State Department.

Wolpe received his B.A. degree from Reed College, and his Ph.D. from the Massachusetts Institute of Technology. He was a member of the boards of directors of the National Endowment for Democracy (NED), Africare, Pathfinders, International and of the advisory board of Coexistence International. He co-directed (with Ambassador David C. Miller Jr.) the Ninetieth American Assembly on "Africa and U.S. National Interests" held in March 1997. He wrote extensively on Africa, American foreign policy, and the management of ethnic and racial conflict.

Howard Wolpe was married to Judy Wolpe until her death in 2006. He died on October 25, 2011, at his home in Saugatuck, Michigan. Memorial services were held in Kalamazoo, Michigan in December 2011 and in Washington, D.C., in January 2012.

== See also ==
- List of Jewish members of the United States Congress

U.S. House of Representatives
Preceded by Garry Brown	Member of the U.S. House of Representatives from Michigan's 3rd congressional district 1979–1993	Succeeded by Paul Henry
Party political offices
Preceded by Jim Blanchard	Democratic nominee for Governor of Michigan; 1994	Succeeded by Geoffrey Fieger
