= 1994 Michigan gubernatorial election =

- November 8, 1994
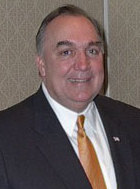

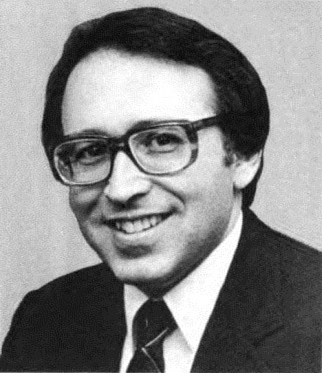
Nominee	John Engler	Howard Wolpe
Party	Republican	Democratic
Running mate	Connie Binsfeld	Debbie Stabenow
Popular vote	1,899,101	1,188,438
Percentage	61.48%	38.47%
- County results Engler: 50–60% 60–70% 70–80% 80–90% Wolpe: 50–60%
Governor before election
John Engler
Republican
Elected Governor
John Engler
Republican

The 1994 Michigan gubernatorial election was held on November 8, 1994, to elect the Governor and Lieutenant Governor of the state of Michigan. Incumbent Governor John Engler, a member of the Republican Party, was re-elected over Democratic Party nominee and Congressman Howard Wolpe. The voter turnout was 45.5%.

== Republican primary ==
=== Candidates ===
- John Engler, incumbent Governor

=== Campaign ===
Engler, who was narrowly elected in 1990, ran unopposed in the Republican primary and retained Lt. Gov. Connie Binsfeld as his running mate.

=== Results ===
Republican primary results
Party	Candidate	Votes	%
Republican	John Engler (inc.)	549,565	99.81%
Republican	Scattering	1,034	0.19%
Total votes		550,599	100.00%

== Democratic primary ==
=== Candidates ===
- H. Lynn Jondahl, State Representative from Okemos
- Larry Owen, former mayor of East Lansing and former member of the Michigan State University Board of Trustees
- Debbie Stabenow, State Senator from Lansing
- Howard Wolpe, former U.S. Representative from Lansing

=== Campaign ===
All four candidates were notably from Lansing or its immediate surroundings.

Wolpe, who had served 7 terms in Congress before retiring in 1993, won a 4-way battle for the Democratic nomination, taking 35 percent of the vote. He bested his closest rival, state Sen. Debbie Stabenow, who had 30 percent. Wolpe eventually chose Stabenow as his running mate.

=== Results ===
Michigan gubernatorial Democratic primary, 1994
Party	Candidate	Votes	%
Democratic	Howard Wolpe	242,847	35.25%
Democratic	Debbie Stabenow	209,641	30.43%
Democratic	Larry Owen	176,675	25.64%
Democratic	H. Lynn Jondahl	59,127	8.58%
Democratic	Scattering	712	0.10%
Total votes		689,002	100.00%

== General election ==
=== Polling ===
Source	Date	Engler (R)	Wolpe (D)
WDIV-TV	Oct. 30, 1994	56%	30%
Detroit News	Oct. 16, 1994	54%	29%
WJBK-TV	Sep. 16, 1994	50%	39%

=== Results ===
1944 Michigan gubernatorial election
Party	Candidate	Votes	%	±%
Republican	John Engler (inc.)	1,899,101	61.48%	+11.72%
Democratic	Howard Wolpe	1,188,438	38.47%	−10.60%
	Scattering	1,538	0.05%	
Majority		710,663	23.01%	
Total votes		3,089,077	100.00%	
Republican hold		Swing	+22.32%	

==== Results by county ====
County	John Engler Republican		Howard Wolpe Democratic		Scattering Write-in		Margin		Total votes cast
County	#	%	#	%	#	%	#	%	Total votes cast
Alcona	3,060	71.15%	1,239	28.81%	2	0.05%	1,821	42.34%	4,301
Alger	2,060	61.25%	1,301	38.69%	2	0.06%	759	22.57%	3,363
Allegan	22,242	75.65%	7,152	24.32%	9	0.03%	15,090	51.32%	29,403
Alpena	7,044	65.31%	3,741	34.69%	0	0.00%	3,303	30.63%	10,785
Antrim	5,814	74.61%	1,978	25.39%	0	0.00%	3,836	49.23%	7,792
Arenac	3,326	64.72%	1,812	35.26%	1	0.02%	1,514	29.46%	5,139
Baraga	1,568	58.33%	1,120	41.67%	0	0.00%	448	16.67%	2,688
Barry	12,933	71.44%	5,170	28.56%	1	0.01%	7,763	42.88%	18,104
Bay	24,244	60.27%	15,982	39.73%	2	0.00%	8,262	20.54%	40,228
Benzie	3,558	68.20%	1,658	31.78%	1	0.02%	1,900	36.42%	5,217
Berrien	30,906	71.71%	12,144	28.18%	51	0.12%	18,762	43.53%	43,101
Branch	8,629	71.51%	3,438	28.49%	0	0.00%	5,191	43.02%	12,067
Calhoun	26,383	63.06%	15,432	36.88%	26	0.06%	10,951	26.17%	41,841
Cass	9,109	71.28%	3,670	28.72%	0	0.00%	5,439	42.56%	12,779
Charlevoix	6,366	71.71%	2,512	28.29%	0	0.00%	3,854	43.41%	8,878
Cheboygan	5,824	70.81%	2,401	29.19%	0	0.00%	3,423	41.62%	8,225
Chippewa	6,615	64.32%	3,669	35.67%	1	0.01%	2,946	28.64%	10,285
Clare	5,895	66.10%	3,022	33.89%	1	0.01%	2,873	32.22%	8,918
Clinton	16,323	68.82%	7,371	31.08%	23	0.10%	8,952	37.75%	23,717
Crawford	3,235	73.21%	1,184	26.79%	0	0.00%	2,051	46.41%	4,419
Delta	7,788	58.19%	5,595	41.81%	0	0.00%	2,193	16.39%	13,383
Dickinson	5,783	61.39%	3,637	38.61%	0	0.00%	2,146	22.78%	9,420
Eaton	24,130	64.64%	13,177	35.30%	23	0.06%	10,953	29.34%	37,330
Emmet	7,972	74.72%	2,695	25.26%	2	0.02%	5,277	49.46%	10,669
Genesee	73,759	49.96%	73,873	50.04%	4	0.00%	-114	-0.08%	147,636
Gladwin	5,522	68.51%	2,538	31.49%	0	0.00%	2,984	37.02%	8,060
Gogebic	3,231	51.80%	3,001	48.11%	6	0.10%	230	3.69%	6,238
Grand Traverse	20,003	74.59%	6,774	25.26%	40	0.15%	13,229	49.33%	26,817
Gratiot	7,931	69.61%	3,462	30.38%	1	0.01%	4,469	39.22%	11,394
Hillsdale	9,335	75.72%	2,994	24.28%	0	0.00%	6,341	51.43%	12,329
Houghton	6,939	63.05%	4,065	36.94%	1	0.01%	2,874	26.12%	11,005
Huron	9,268	73.77%	3,294	26.22%	2	0.02%	5,974	47.55%	12,564
Ingham	53,088	54.79%	43,790	45.19%	24	0.02%	9,298	9.60%	96,902
Ionia	11,911	70.10%	5,080	29.90%	0	0.00%	6,831	40.20%	16,991
Iosco	7,163	69.86%	3,090	30.14%	0	0.00%	4,073	39.72%	10,253
Iron	3,103	59.16%	2,142	40.84%	0	0.00%	961	18.32%	5,245
Isabella	10,030	64.72%	5,467	35.28%	0	0.00%	4,563	29.44%	15,497
Jackson	32,282	70.01%	13,829	29.99%	0	0.00%	18,453	40.02%	46,111
Kalamazoo	44,158	60.30%	29,072	39.70%	0	0.00%	15,086	20.60%	73,230
Kalkaska	3,338	71.97%	1,298	27.99%	2	0.04%	2,040	43.98%	4,638
Kent	121,988	74.36%	42,027	25.62%	34	0.02%	79,961	48.74%	164,049
Keweenaw	607	62.13%	366	37.46%	4	0.41%	241	24.67%	977
Lake	2,068	62.27%	1,252	37.70%	1	0.03%	816	24.57%	3,321
Lapeer	18,825	71.60%	7,468	28.40%	0	0.00%	11,357	43.19%	26,293
Leelanau	6,063	72.86%	2,255	27.10%	4	0.05%	3,808	45.76%	8,322
Lenawee	17,029	63.21%	9,912	36.79%	0	0.00%	7,117	26.42%	26,941
Livingston	35,583	76.46%	10,951	23.53%	3	0.01%	24,632	52.93%	46,537
Luce	1,124	58.09%	811	41.91%	0	0.00%	313	16.18%	1,935
Mackinac	2,947	63.72%	1,6789	36.28%	0	0.00%	1,269	27.44%	4,625
Macomb	173,003	69.89%	74,473	30.09%	63	0.03%	98,530	39.80%	247,539
Manistee	5,465	66.46%	2,758	33.54%	0	0.00%	2,707	32.92%	8,223
Marquette	11,331	53.27%	9,938	46.73%	0	0.00%	1,393	6.55%	21,269
Mason	7,312	70.58%	3,048	29.42%	0	0.00%	4,264	41.16%	10,360
Mecosta	6,600	67.62%	3,157	32.35%	3	0.03%	3,443	35.28%	9,760
Menominee	4,721	63.92%	2,665	36.08%	0	0.00%	2,056	27.84%	7,386
Midland	20,579	70.30%	8,687	29.68%	6	0.02%	11,892	40.63%	29,272
Missaukee	3,714	77.17%	1,099	22.83%	0	0.00%	2,615	54.33%	4,813
Monroe	24,218	63.15%	14,126	36.84%	4	0.01%	10,092	26.32%	38,348
Montcalm	11,149	70.76%	4,607	29.24%	0	0.00%	6,542	41.52%	15,756
Montmorency	2,621	72.32%	1,003	27.68%	0	0.00%	1,618	44.65%	3,624
Muskegon	28,911	59.80%	19,430	40.19%	5	0.01%	9,481	19.61%	48,346
Newaygo	9,307	71.23%	3,755	28.74%	4	0.03%	5,552	42.49%	13,006
Oakland	269,511	66.50%	135,004	33.31%	773	0.19%	134,507	33.19%	405,288
Oceana	5,158	68.95%	2,320	31.01%	3	0.04%	2,838	37.94%	7,481
Ogemaw	4,661	68.09%	2,182	31.88%	2	0.03%	2,479	36.22%	6,845
Ontonagon	2,032	58.88%	1,418	41.09%	1	0.03%	614	17.79%	3,451
Osceola	5,087	71.47%	2,030	28.52%	1	0.01%	3,057	42.95%	7,118
Oscoda	2,266	75.21%	747	24.79%	0	0.00%	1,519	50.41%	3,013
Otsego	5,215	74.87%	1,749	25.11%	1	0.01%	3,466	49.76%	6,965
Ottawa	58,321	82.85%	12,001	17.05%	71	0.10%	46,320	65.80%	70,393
Presque Isle	3,979	71.23%	1,607	28.77%	0	0.00%	2,372	42.46%	5,586
Roscommon	6,461	68.69%	2,945	31.31%	0	0.00%	3,516	37.38%	9,406
Saginaw	43,545	59.80%	29,169	40.06%	105	0.14%	14,376	19.74%	72,819
Sanilac	10,425	74.80%	3,513	25.20%	0	0.00%	6,912	49.59%	13,938
Schoolcraft	1,689	57.55%	1,246	42.45%	0	0.00%	443	15.09%	2,935
Shiawassee	16,447	67.28%	7,971	32.61%	28	0.11%	8,476	34.67%	24,446
St. Clair	34,078	70.47%	14,233	29.43%	45	0.09%	19,845	41.04%	48,356
St. Joseph	11,073	72.93%	4,104	27.03%	6	0.04%	6,969	45.90%	15,183
Tuscola	12,188	67.52%	5,862	32.48%	0	0.00%	6,326	35.05%	18,050
Van Buren	13,894	67.76%	6,612	32.24%	0	0.00%	7,282	35.51%	20,506
Washtenaw	49,779	53.58%	43,066	46.35%	67	0.07%	6,713	7.23%	92,912
Wayne	269,501	42.96%	357,798	57.03%	69	0.01%	-88,297	-14.07%	627,368
Wexford	6,758	72.71%	2,526	27.18%	10	0.11%	4,232	45.53%	9,294
Total	1,899,101	61.48%	1,188,438	38.47%	1,538	0.05%	710,663	23.01%	3,089,077

===== Counties that flipped from Democratic to Republican =====
- Alger
- Arenac
- Bay
- Chippewa
- Clare
- Delta
- Dickinson
- Gladwin
- Gogebic
- Ingham
- Iron
- Lake
- Marquette
- Menominee
- Muskegon
- Ogemaw
- Saginaw
- Schoolcraft
- Shiawassee
- Washtenaw
