= Trial of Geoffrey Fieger =

United States v. Fieger
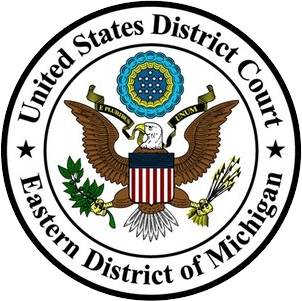
- Court: United States District Court for the Eastern District of Michigan
- Full case name: United States of America v. Geoffrey Fieger, Vernon Johnson
- Decided: June 2, 2008
- Verdict: Acquitted on all charges
- Defendant: Geoffrey Fieger

Court membership
- Judge sitting: Paul D. Borman

United States v. Fieger (officially the United States of America v. Geoffrey Fieger, Vernon Johnson) was a 2008 federal trial of famed lawyer Geoffrey Fieger, who was indicted on charges of violations of the Federal Election Campaign Act, making false statements, and obstruction of justice. Vernon Johnson, a fellow law firm partner, was a co-defendant in the case. The charges were brought in relation to the John Edwards 2004 presidential campaign.

After four days of deliberations, the jury found Fieger not guilty on all ten charges, and Johnson was found not guilty of the five charges he was indicted on.

Fieger was notably represented by famed lawyer Gerry Spence.

== Background ==
It was alleged that the Fieger and Johnson used 60 straw donors to make contributions in the then-maximum allowable amount of $2,000 per donor. Geoffrey Fieger is best known for representing doctor Jack Kevorkian. Vernon Johnson was his law firm partner.

Prosecutors alleged that the conspiracy occurred from March 2003 to January 2004. Assistant U.S. Attorney Lynn Helland, the chief of the Special Prosecutions Unit of the E.D. Mich, served as prosecutor, with M. Kendall Day also prosecuting the case. A grand jury issued 40 subpoenas, while around 80 FBI agents raided Fieger's law firm.

Fieger was indicted on five counts of violations of the Federal Election Campaign Act, four counts of making false statements, and one count of obstruction of justice. Johnson was indicted on three counts of violations of the FECA, and two counts of making false statements.

Fieger faced up to 55 years in prison and fines up to $2.5 million if convicted on all 10 charges.

== Trial ==
The trial lasted for eight weeks. Testimony itself lasted for 18 days, with jurors deliberating over four days. Fieger and Johnson were both acquitted of all charges.

Spence argued that his client did not know that he was violating the law, and stated that "people should not be charged with felonies when they did not knowingly and willingly violate the law".

Some jurors suspected political motivation as the reason for the prosecution. Peter Margulies, a law professor, called the prosecution "overkill" by the government, stating the reason the jury acquitted Fieger was due to them believing that the government had overreached, acted without an appropriate sense of proportion, and did not prove that Fieger's intent was to deceive.
