= A Very Still Life =

Studio album by Jack Kevorkian
- Released: May 27, 1997
- Genre: Jazz
- Label: Lucid Subjazz

A Very Still Life is the only album by Jack Kevorkian, released on the Lucid Subjazz label, in which he plays the flute. It was released on May 27, 1997. The 5000-unit limited release was reviewed in Entertainment Weekly online as "weird" but "good natured". The CD initially suffered from slow sales. As of 1997, 1400 units had been sold. Kevorkian wrote all the songs but one; the album was reviewed in jazzreview.com as "very much grooviness" except for one tune, with "stuff in between that's worthy of multiple spins."

== Track listing ==
1. Whispering, Came Violets
2. Summertooth
3. Brotherhood Of
4. Very Still Life
5. August to Amber
6. Fuguetta Caffeine
7. Interlude: Unfinished Minuet
8. In Strange Loops
9. Back at Abby's
10. Interlude: Gavat
11. Geoff's Mood
12. Une Lettre de Jean
