= Colleen House =

American politician (1952–2022)

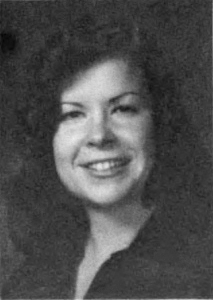

Member of the Michigan House of Representatives from the 99th district
- In office January 1, 1983 – December 31, 1986
- Preceded by: Donald Van Singel
- Succeeded by: Joanne G. Emmons

Member of the Michigan House of Representatives from the 101st district
- In office 1974 – December 31, 1976
- Preceded by: J. Bob Traxler
- Succeeded by: James A. Barcia

Personal details
- Born: March 17, 1952 Bay City, Michigan, U.S.
- Died: December 24, 2022 (aged 70) Washington, D.C., U.S.
- Party: Republican
- Spouses: John Engler (m. 1975; div. 1986); John Gizzi (m. 2002)
- Education: Michigan State University (BA)

Colleen House (March 17, 1952 – December 24, 2022) was an American politician who served as a member of the Michigan House of Representatives, from 1974 to 1976 and 1983 to 1986.

== Early life and education ==
House was born in Bay City, Michigan, on March 17, 1952, to parents James Daniel and Kathleen House.

House graduated from All Saints Central High School in 1969. House earned a B.A. in political science from Michigan State University in 1973.

== Career ==
House was elected to the Michigan House of Representatives in a special election in 1974. House represented the 101st district until December 31, 1976. From 1977-78, she served as director of public affairs for the Michigan Chamber of Commerce. In 1980, House helped run the presidential primary campaign of George H.W. Bush in Michigan and his upset victory over front-runner Ronald Reagan helped him to remain in the race until the GOP National Convention, where Reagan tapped him as his vice presidential runningmate. On November 2, 1982, House was again elected to the Michigan House of Representatives where she represented the 99th district from January 12, 1983, to December 31, 1986. In 1986, she became the first woman to run for governor of Michigan, but she lost the Republican primary. But the winner, Wayne County Executive Bill Lucas, subsequently named House as lieutenant governor runningmate—thereby making her the first-ever woman to be nominated by Republicans for Michigan's second-highest office. In November 1986, the Lucas-Engler ticket lost to Democratic Gov. James Blanchard and Lieutenant Governor Martha Griffiths. House came to Washington DC in 1989, where she served as director of intergovernmental affairs at the U.S. Department of Commerce and in the National Oceanic and Atmospheric Administration (NOAA). House served as International Political Liaison for the International Republican Institute (IRI) from 1993-2015 where, according to IRI President Lorne Craner, "Colleen oversaw much of our effort to secure Americans to train their counterparts in electoral politics and competing at the polling place. She was inarguably a figure of consequence in the history of IRI."

== Personal life and death ==
In 1975, House married state representative John Engler in Bay City. In 1986, House and Engler divorced. In 2002, House married Newsmax political columnist and White House correspondent, John Gizzi. House was Roman Catholic. Long active at St. Matthew’s Cathedral in Washington, D.C., House was a lector at Masses, trained other parishioners to read portions of the Mass and served as a pontifical lector.

House died from complications with dementia at her home in Washington, D.C., on December 24, 2022, at the age of 70.

Party political offices
Preceded by Thomas E. Brennan	Republican nominee for Lieutenant Governor of Michigan; 1986	Succeeded by Connie Binsfeld
