= Joanne G. Emmons =

American politician (1934–2022)

The Honorable Joanne G. Emmons

Member of the Michigan Senate
- In office January 1, 1991 – December 31, 2002
- Preceded by: John Engler
- Succeeded by: Virg Bernero
- Constituency: 35th district (1991–1994); 23rd district (1995–2002)

Member of the Michigan House of Representatives from the 99th district
- In office January 1, 1987 – December 31, 1990
- Preceded by: Colleen Engler
- Succeeded by: James E. McBryde

Personal details
- Born: February 8, 1934 Big Rapids, Michigan, U.S.
- Died: March 31, 2022 (aged 88)
- Party: Republican
- Spouse: John
- Education: Michigan State University

Joanne G. Emmons (February 8, 1934 – March 31, 2022) was a Republican member of both houses of the Michigan Legislature from 1987 until 1999.

== Biography ==
Born February 8, 1934, to Ray and Emma Gregory in Big Rapids, Emmons married her husband John in 1956. She was the valedictorian of her class at Mecosta High School in 1952 and graduated from Michigan State University in 1956 with a degree in home economics. She taught that subject at her high school alma mater from 1956 until 1958.

In 1976, Emmons was elected treasurer of Big Rapids Township, a position she held for 10 years, as well as chair of the Mecosta County Republican Party, where she served until 1980. From 1981 to 1986, Emmons was a member of the Michigan Townships Association Board of Directors, and was also on the board of the Michigan Municipal Treasurers Association for two years.

She served two terms in the Michigan House of Representatives, from 1987 until 1990, and three terms in the Senate. She served as majority floor leader of the Senate during the 91st Legislature.

Emmons was involved with a number of community organizations, including the Central Michigan Mental Health Board, the Area Agency on Aging Advisory Board, the Pleasant View Farm Bureau Discussion Group, the Lutheran Child and Family Services Board of Directors. She was a member of Kappa Omicron Nu.

She was an unsuccessful candidate for the Michigan State University Board of Trustees in 2002. Emmons died on March 31, 2022, at the age of 88.

Emmons was not related to State Senator Judy Emmons.
