= 1986 Michigan gubernatorial election =

- November 4, 1986
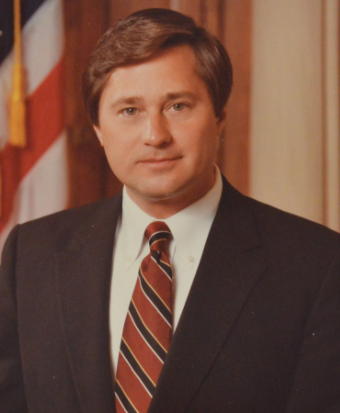

| Nominee | James J. Blanchard | William Lucas |
| Party | Democratic | Republican |
| Running mate | Martha Griffiths | Colleen Engler |
| Popular vote | 1,632,138 | 753,647 |
| Percentage | 68.10% | 31.45% |
- Blanchard: 50–60% 60–70% 70–80% 80–90% >90% Lucas: 50–60% 60–70% 70–80% 80–90%
Governor before election
James J. Blanchard
Democratic
Elected Governor
James J. Blanchard
Democratic

The 1986 Michigan gubernatorial election was held on November 4, 1986. Democratic incumbent James J. Blanchard won reelection in a landslide over Republican William Lucas. Blanchard carried every county in the state except for Ottawa County, which as of 2026, has not voted Democratic since 1890.

This was the most recent election in which a male Democrat was elected governor of Michigan.

== Primary election ==
Michigan held primary elections on August 5, 1986.

=== Democratic party ===
Incumbent governor James J. Blanchard won renomination against token opposition.

==== Candidates ====
- James J. Blanchard, incumbent governor
- Henry Wilson, follower of Lyndon LaRouche

==== Results ====
Democratic primary results
| Party | Candidate | Votes | % |
|---|---|---|---|
| Democratic | James J. Blanchard (inc.) | 428,125 | 93.66% |
| Democratic | Henry Wilson | 28,940 | 6.33% |
| Democratic | Scattering | 22 | 0.01% |
| Total votes | | 457,087 | 100.00% |

=== Republican party ===
Wayne County executive William Lucas made history by being the first African American nominee for either major party for Governor of Michigan.

==== Candidates ====
- Dick Chrysler, automotive businessman
- Colleen Engler, member of Michigan House of Representatives
- William Lucas, Wayne County Executive
- Dan Murphy, Oakland County Executive

==== Results ====
Republican primary results
| Party | Candidate | Votes | % |
|---|---|---|---|
| Republican | William Lucas | 259,153 | 44.50% |
| Republican | Dick Chrysler | 198,174 | 34.03% |
| Republican | Colleen Engler | 63,927 | 10.98% |
| Republican | Dan Murphy | 61,073 | 10.49% |
| Republican | Scattering | 10 | 0.00% |
| Total votes | | 582,337 | 100.00% |

== General election ==
=== Candidates ===
Major party candidates

- James J. Blanchard & Martha Griffiths, Democratic
- William Lucas & Colleen Engler, Republican

Other candidates

- Martin P. McLaughlin & Alva A. Crivens, Workers League

=== Results ===
1986 Michigan gubernatorial election
| Party | Candidate | Votes | % | ±% |
|---|---|---|---|---|
| Democratic | James J. Blanchard (inc.) | 1,632,138 | 68.10% | +16.75% |
| Republican | William Lucas | 753,647 | 31.45% | −13.60% |
| Workers League | Martin P. McLaughlin | 9,477 | 0.40% | +0.33% |
| | Scattering | 1,302 | 0.05% | |
| Majority | | 878,491 | 36.66% | |
| Total votes | | 2,396,564 | 100.00% | |
| Democratic hold | | Swing | +30.35% | |

==== Results by county ====
By sweeping all but one county, Blanchard ended a number of very long streaks of Republican dominance in counties across the state. As of 2026, this election is the only one in which Antrim County and Charlevoix County have voted Democratic. This was also the first time Benzie County voted Democratic since its organization in 1869; however, unlike the aforementioned two counties, it has subsequently voted Democratic. (Note: In 2006 and 2022.) Other notable flips were Van Buren County voting Democratic for the first time since 1852 and Allegan County and Sanilac County doing the same for the first time since 1854. This election was one of only two instances of Wexford County voting Democratic. (Note: The other was in 1912.)

As of the 2026, this is the last election in which the Democratic candidate has won any of the following counties: Allegan, Antrim, Barry, Berrien, Branch, Charlevoix, Cheboygan, Emmet, Hillsdale, Huron, Kalkaska, Lapeer, Lenawee, Livingston, Mecosta, Missaukee, Montmorency, Newaygo, Osceola, Oscoda, Otsego, St. Clair, St. Joseph, Sanilac, and Wexford.

| County | James J. Blanchard Democratic | | William Lucas Republican | | Martin P. McLaughlin Workers League | | Scattering Write-in | | Margin | | Total votes cast |
| County | # | % | # | % | # | % | # | % | # | % | Total votes cast |
|---|---|---|---|---|---|---|---|---|---|---|---|
| Alcona | 2,186 | 65.74% | 1,132 | 34.05% | 5 | 0.15% | 2 | 0.06% | 1,054 | 31.70% | 3,325 |
| Alger | 2,080 | 76.08% | 651 | 23.81% | 3 | 0.11% | 0 | 0.00% | 1,429 | 52.27% | 2,734 |
| Allegan | 10,875 | 53.61% | 9,351 | 46.09% | 56 | 0.28% | 5 | 0.02% | 1,524 | 7.51% | 20,287 |
| Alpena | 5,684 | 68.22% | 2,632 | 31.59% | 14 | 0.17% | 2 | 0.02% | 3,052 | 36.63% | 8,332 |
| Antrim | 3,819 | 67.46% | 1,816 | 32.08% | 26 | 0.46% | 0 | 0.00% | 2,003 | 35.38% | 5,661 |
| Arenac | 3,199 | 77.25% | 927 | 22.39% | 15 | 0.36% | 0 | 0.00% | 2,272 | 54.87% | 4,141 |
| Baraga | 1,674 | 71.45% | 666 | 28.43% | 3 | 0.13% | 0 | 0.00% | 1,008 | 43.02% | 2,343 |
| Barry | 7,846 | 63.76% | 4,392 | 35.69% | 53 | 0.43% | 14 | 0.11% | 3,454 | 28.07% | 12,305 |
| Bay | 24,590 | 75.07% | 8,048 | 24.57% | 112 | 0.34% | 8 | 0.02% | 16,542 | 50.50% | 32,758 |
| Benzie | 2,496 | 65.98% | 1,277 | 33.76% | 7 | 0.19% | 3 | 0.08% | 1,219 | 32.22% | 3,783 |
| Berrien | 21,640 | 60.79% | 13,765 | 38.67% | 193 | 0.54% | 0 | 0.00% | 7,875 | 22.12% | 35,598 |
| Branch | 5,723 | 60.26% | 3,748 | 39.47% | 23 | 0.24% | 3 | 0.03% | 1,975 | 20.80% | 9,497 |
| Calhoun | 25,989 | 72.66% | 9,608 | 26.86% | 159 | 0.44% | 10 | 0.03% | 16,381 | 45.80% | 35,766 |
| Cass | 6,697 | 65.53% | 3,497 | 34.22% | 26 | 0.25% | 0 | 0.00% | 3,200 | 31.31% | 10,220 |
| Charlevoix | 4,515 | 68.92% | 1,972 | 30.10% | 64 | 0.98% | 0 | 0.00% | 2,543 | 38.82% | 6,551 |
| Cheboygan | 4,881 | 74.17% | 1,685 | 25.60% | 15 | 0.23% | 0 | 0.00% | 3,196 | 48.56% | 6,581 |
| Chippewa | 5,997 | 72.62% | 2,245 | 27.19% | 16 | 0.19% | 0 | 0.00% | 3,752 | 45.43% | 8,258 |
| Clare | 5,390 | 71.90% | 2,034 | 27.13% | 71 | 0.95% | 2 | 0.03% | 3,356 | 44.76% | 7,497 |
| Clinton | 10,010 | 63.98% | 5,552 | 35.49% | 39 | 0.25% | 44 | 0.28% | 4,458 | 28.49% | 15,645 |
| Crawford | 2,079 | 65.69% | 1,060 | 33.49% | 24 | 0.76% | 2 | 0.06% | 1,019 | 32.20% | 3,165 |
| Delta | 7,763 | 72.42% | 2,930 | 27.33% | 26 | 0.24% | 0 | 0.00% | 4,833 | 45.09% | 10,719 |
| Dickinson | 5,602 | 72.72% | 2,081 | 27.02% | 20 | 0.26% | 0 | 0.00% | 3,521 | 45.71% | 7,703 |
| Eaton | 16,448 | 66.05% | 8,345 | 33.51% | 111 | 0.45% | 0 | 0.00% | 8,103 | 32.54% | 24,904 |
| Emmet | 4,733 | 65.53% | 2,454 | 33.97% | 35 | 0.48% | 1 | 0.01% | 2,279 | 31.55% | 7,223 |
| Genesee | 89,778 | 79.00% | 23,155 | 20.38% | 662 | 0.58% | 49 | 0.04% | 66,623 | 58.62% | 113,644 |
| Gladwin | 4,535 | 73.30% | 1,609 | 26.01% | 43 | 0.70% | 0 | 0.00% | 2,926 | 47.29% | 6,187 |
| Gogebic | 5,350 | 82.89% | 1,100 | 17.04% | 4 | 0.06% | 0 | 0.00% | 4,250 | 65.85% | 6,454 |
| Grand Traverse | 11,232 | 62.96% | 6,578 | 36.87% | 25 | 0.14% | 6 | 0.03% | 4,654 | 26.09% | 17,841 |
| Gratiot | 7,092 | 69.83% | 3,034 | 29.87% | 28 | 0.28% | 2 | 0.02% | 4,058 | 39.96% | 10,156 |
| Hillsdale | 6,044 | 58.51% | 4,255 | 41.19% | 31 | 0.30% | 0 | 0.00% | 1,789 | 17.32% | 10,330 |
| Houghton | 6,331 | 69.67% | 2,739 | 30.14% | 17 | 0.19% | 0 | 0.00% | 3,592 | 39.53% | 9,087 |
| Huron | 6,750 | 66.55% | 3,373 | 33.25% | 19 | 0.19% | 1 | 0.01% | 3,377 | 33.29% | 10,143 |
| Ingham | 52,054 | 69.93% | 21,536 | 28.93% | 551 | 0.74% | 297 | 0.40% | 30,518 | 41.00% | 74,438 |
| Ionia | 8,358 | 66.85% | 4,072 | 32.57% | 50 | 0.40% | 22 | 0.18% | 4,286 | 34.28% | 12,502 |
| Iosco | 5,516 | 72.85% | 2,029 | 26.80% | 24 | 0.32% | 3 | 0.04% | 3,487 | 46.05% | 7,572 |
| Iron | 3,491 | 73.51% | 1,250 | 26.32% | 8 | 0.17% | 0 | 0.00% | 2,241 | 47.19% | 4,749 |
| Isabella | 8,325 | 66.08% | 4,205 | 33.38% | 65 | 0.52% | 4 | 0.03% | 4,120 | 32.70% | 12,599 |
| Jackson | 23,899 | 65.47% | 12,358 | 33.85% | 212 | 0.58% | 37 | 0.10% | 11,541 | 31.61% | 36,506 |
| Kalamazoo | 36,817 | 66.65% | 18,209 | 32.96% | 190 | 0.34% | 22 | 0.04% | 18,608 | 33.69% | 55,238 |
| Kalkaska | 2,425 | 67.25% | 1,168 | 32.39% | 13 | 0.36% | 0 | 0.00% | 1,257 | 34.86% | 3,606 |
| Kent | 70,754 | 56.78% | 53,233 | 42.72% | 625 | 0.50% | 9 | 0.01% | 17,521 | 14.06% | 124,621 |
| Keweenaw | 731 | 75.36% | 239 | 24.64% | 0 | 0.00% | 0 | 0.00% | 492 | 50.72% | 970 |
| Lake | 1,887 | 74.32% | 623 | 24.54% | 27 | 1.06% | 2 | 0.08% | 1,264 | 49.78% | 2,539 |
| Lapeer | 11,414 | 65.07% | 5,980 | 34.09% | 137 | 0.78% | 9 | 0.05% | 5,434 | 30.98% | 17,540 |
| Leelanau | 3,360 | 59.27% | 2,291 | 40.41% | 9 | 0.16% | 9 | 0.16% | 1,069 | 18.86% | 5,669 |
| Lenawee | 13,846 | 66.13% | 7,043 | 33.64% | 42 | 0.20% | 7 | 0.03% | 6,803 | 32.49% | 20,938 |
| Livingston | 17,119 | 61.18% | 10,625 | 37.97% | 148 | 0.53% | 91 | 0.33% | 6,494 | 23.21% | 27,983 |
| Luce | 1,314 | 77.29% | 382 | 22.47% | 4 | 0.24% | 0 | 0.00% | 932 | 54.82% | 1,700 |
| Mackinac | 2,829 | 73.92% | 989 | 25.84% | 9 | 0.24% | 0 | 0.00% | 1,840 | 48.08% | 3,827 |
| Macomb | 128,120 | 68.03% | 59,315 | 31.49% | 770 | 0.41% | 136 | 0.07% | 68,805 | 36.53% | 188,341 |
| Manistee | 4,995 | 71.81% | 1,939 | 27.88% | 22 | 0.32% | 0 | 0.00% | 3,056 | 43.93% | 6,956 |
| Marquette | 13,775 | 79.15% | 3,578 | 20.56% | 51 | 0.29% | 0 | 0.00% | 10,197 | 58.59% | 17,404 |
| Mason | 5,291 | 66.79% | 2,556 | 32.26% | 72 | 0.91% | 3 | 0.04% | 2,735 | 34.52% | 7,922 |
| Mecosta | 6,070 | 65.57% | 3,161 | 34.15% | 20 | 0.22% | 6 | 0.06% | 2,909 | 31.42% | 9,257 |
| Menominee | 3,949 | 65.01% | 2,117 | 34.85% | 8 | 0.13% | 0 | 0.00% | 1,832 | 30.16% | 6,074 |
| Midland | 15,458 | 63.49% | 8,758 | 35.97% | 116 | 0.48% | 14 | 0.06% | 6,700 | 27.52% | 24,346 |
| Missaukee | 2,229 | 56.86% | 1,663 | 42.42% | 28 | 0.71% | 0 | 0.00% | 566 | 14.44% | 3,920 |
| Monroe | 20,126 | 72.04% | 7,750 | 27.74% | 60 | 0.21% | 3 | 0.01% | 12,376 | 44.30% | 27,939 |
| Montcalm | 7,323 | 64.75% | 3,951 | 34.93% | 34 | 0.30% | 2 | 0.02% | 3,372 | 29.81% | 11,310 |
| Montmorency | 2,127 | 69.62% | 921 | 30.15% | 7 | 0.23% | 0 | 0.00% | 1,206 | 39.48% | 3,055 |
| Muskegon | 29,257 | 71.96% | 11,269 | 27.72% | 131 | 0.32% | 1 | 0.00% | 17,988 | 44.24% | 40,658 |
| Newaygo | 5,742 | 61.25% | 3,601 | 38.41% | 32 | 0.34% | 0 | 0.00% | 2,141 | 22.84% | 9,375 |
| Oakland | 176,065 | 61.72% | 108,104 | 37.90% | 881 | 0.31% | 215 | 0.08% | 67,961 | 23.82% | 285,265 |
| Oceana | 4,230 | 69.21% | 1,856 | 30.37% | 21 | 0.34% | 5 | 0.08% | 2,374 | 38.84% | 6,112 |
| Ogemaw | 4,346 | 74.88% | 1,444 | 24.88% | 12 | 0.21% | 2 | 0.03% | 2,902 | 50.00% | 5,804 |
| Ontonagon | 2,368 | 76.09% | 738 | 23.71% | 6 | 0.19% | 0 | 0.00% | 1,630 | 52.38% | 3,112 |
| Osceola | 3,694 | 63.21% | 2,129 | 36.43% | 20 | 0.34% | 1 | 0.02% | 1,565 | 26.78% | 5,844 |
| Oscoda | 1,347 | 61.62% | 827 | 37.83% | 12 | 0.55% | 0 | 0.00% | 520 | 23.79% | 2,186 |
| Otsego | 3,046 | 66.74% | 1,498 | 32.82% | 20 | 0.44% | 0 | 0.00% | 1,548 | 33.92% | 4,564 |
| Ottawa | 20,870 | 44.41% | 26,018 | 55.37% | 104 | 0.22% | 0 | 0.00% | -5,148 | -10.96% | 46,992 |
| Presque Isle | 3,761 | 72.52% | 1,394 | 26.88% | 31 | 0.60% | 0 | 0.00% | 2,367 | 45.64% | 5,186 |
| Roscommon | 5,486 | 72.44% | 2,072 | 27.36% | 15 | 0.20% | 0 | 0.00% | 3,414 | 45.08% | 7,573 |
| Saginaw | 46,700 | 75.65% | 14,685 | 23.79% | 344 | 0.56% | 4 | 0.01% | 32,015 | 51.86% | 61,733 |
| Sanilac | 7,101 | 64.69% | 3,849 | 35.06% | 25 | 0.23% | 2 | 0.02% | 3,252 | 29.63% | 10,977 |
| Schoolcraft | 1,772 | 77.21% | 521 | 22.70% | 2 | 0.09% | 0 | 0.00% | 1,251 | 54.51% | 2,295 |
| Shiawassee | 14,630 | 71.49% | 5,730 | 28.00% | 84 | 0.41% | 19 | 0.09% | 8,900 | 43.49% | 20,463 |
| St. Clair | 23,544 | 66.78% | 11,555 | 32.78% | 155 | 0.44% | 0 | 0.00% | 11,989 | 34.01% | 35,254 |
| St. Joseph | 7,688 | 61.12% | 4,859 | 38.63% | 31 | 0.25% | 0 | 0.00% | 2,829 | 22.49% | 12,578 |
| Tuscola | 9,453 | 70.38% | 3,933 | 29.28% | 46 | 0.34% | 0 | 0.00% | 5,520 | 41.10% | 13,432 |
| Van Buren | 10,560 | 67.07% | 5,127 | 32.56% | 56 | 0.36% | 2 | 0.01% | 5,433 | 34.51% | 15,745 |
| Washtenaw | 49,066 | 70.33% | 20,226 | 28.99% | 445 | 0.64% | 27 | 0.04% | 28,840 | 41.34% | 69,764 |
| Wayne | 393,785 | 73.49% | 140,140 | 26.15% | 1,744 | 0.33% | 191 | 0.04% | 253,645 | 47.33% | 535,860 |
| Wexford | 4,997 | 67.23% | 2,420 | 32.56% | 13 | 0.17% | 3 | 0.04% | 2,577 | 34.67% | 7,433 |
| Total | 1,632,138 | 68.10% | 753,647 | 31.45% | 9,477 | 0.40% | 1,302 | 0.05% | 878,491 | 36.66% | 2,396,564 |

===== Counties that flipped from Republican to Democratic =====
- Alcona
- Allegan
- Antrim
- Barry
- Benzie
- Berrien
- Branch
- Calhoun
- Cass
- Charlevoix
- Clinton
- Crawford
- Eaton
- Emmet
- Grand Traverse
- Gratiot
- Hillsdale
- Huron
- Ionia
- Isabella
- Jackson
- Kalamazoo
- Kalkaska
- Kent
- Lapeer
- Leelanau
- Lenawee
- Livingston
- Mason
- Mecosta
- Midland
- Missaukee
- Montcalm
- Montmorency
- Newaygo
- Oakland
- Oceana
- Osceola
- Oscoda
- Otsego
- Sanilac
- St. Clair
- St. Joseph
- Tuscola
- Van Buren
- Wexford
