= Geoffrey Fieger =

American attorney

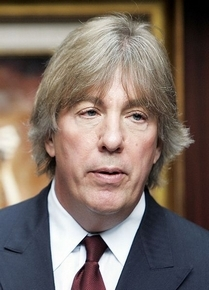
- Fieger in 2008

Personal details
- Born: December 23, 1950 (age 75) Detroit, Michigan, U.S.
- Party: Democratic
- Spouse: Kathleen Fieger
- Relatives: Doug Fieger (brother)
- Education: University of Michigan (BA, MA); Detroit College of Law (JD)
- Website: Official website

Geoffrey Fieger (born December 23, 1950) is an American attorney based in Southfield, Michigan. Fieger is the founder of the law firm Fieger Law, and has also appeared as a legal commentator for NBC and MSNBC. His practice focuses on personal injury, civil rights litigation and medical malpractice cases.

Fieger served as the defense attorney for assisted suicide advocate Jack Kevorkian and was an unsuccessful Democratic nominee for governor of Michigan in 1998.

== Early life ==
Fieger was born in Detroit, Michigan, grew up in suburban Oak Park, the son of Bernard Julian and June Beth (Oberer) Fieger. Bernard was Jewish, and June was of Norwegian descent. Fieger earned Bachelor of Arts (1974) and Master of Arts (1976) degrees from the University of Michigan, followed by a Juris Doctor degree from the Detroit College of Law in 1979.

Fieger's younger brother is Doug Fieger, frontman of the late-'70s/early-'80s rock group the Knack, best known for their hit song "My Sharona."

== Career ==
=== Law ===
Fieger has been involved with a variety of high-profile or controversial cases. In 1994, he represented Jack Kevorkian in the first of several doctor-assisted suicide trials. Kevorkian was acquitted in that trial and all subsequent trials where Fieger represented him. (Kevorkian was convicted when he represented himself in his last assisted suicide trial in 1999.) These events were made into a movie, You Don't Know Jack, aired on HBO, in which Fieger was portrayed by actor Danny Huston.

Other notable clients and cases include:

- The family of Scott Amedure in a 1999 wrongful death and negligence suit against The Jenny Jones Show. Fieger was unsuccessful in his representation, with the Michigan Court of Appeals holding that The Jenny Jones Show was not liable for Amedure's death.
- The family of Isaiah Shoels, who was killed in the Columbine High School massacre.
- Ralf Panitz, accused of killing his ex-wife Nancy Campbell-Panitz in July 2000, following their appearance along with Panitz's new wife, on a segment of The Jerry Springer Show. Panitz was convicted in 2002.
- The family of Aiyana Jones, a seven-year-old girl who was shot during a police raid in 2010, conducted while a crew was doing a taping of the A&E reality show The First 48.
- A lawsuit against the Michigan State Police on behalf of the family of 64-year-old Jacqueline Nichols, a pedestrian who was killed when a cruiser crashed into her during a police chase in Flint on July 3, 2014. The state agreed to settle the suit for $7.7 million.
- A $100 million class action lawsuit in regards to the 2014–2015 Legionnaires' disease outbreak in the Flint, Michigan, area, on behalf of four Genesee County residents who contracted the water borne illness during the Flint water crisis, including one woman who died seven days after entering the emergency room with a headache. The suit names McLaren Regional Medical Center in Flint and several Michigan Department of Environmental Quality officials as defendants.
- The family of Kenneka Jenkins, a 19-year-old girl who was found dead in a Rosemont, Illinois, hotel freezer in 2017 after a night of partying.
- A $100 million lawsuit in regards to the 2021 Oxford High School shooting was filed by Fieger against Oxford Community Schools on behalf of a 17-year-old student who was shot in the neck and her sister who was walking next to her as she was shot. The suit claims that the girls are experiencing PTSD and that the school failed to protect the students by allowing the shooter to return to class after they had direct information that he was exhibiting homicidal ideation.

=== Politics ===
In 1998, Fieger ran unsuccessfully as the Democratic nominee for Governor of Michigan, as an anti-establishment populist, and pulled off what was widely considered an upset victory in the Democratic primary. During the campaign Fieger made several inflammatory and controversial comments and statements, including

- an assertion that his opponent John Engler was the product of miscegenation between humans and barnyard animals;
- a claim that "rabbis are closer to Nazis than they think."
- the observation that, "in 2,000 years we've probably made somebody who is the equivalent of Elvis into God, so I see no reason why not to believe that in 2,000 years Elvis will be God. Probably if we went back 2,000 years, and they said, you know, we think Jesus is God, and Jesus is just some goofball that got nailed to the cross."
- a radio appearance characterizing Michigan appellate judges as "jackasses" for overturning a 15 million dollar medical malpractice judgment he had won. (A lower court reprimand based on these comments was eventually upheld by the Michigan Supreme Court.)

In August 2007, Fieger was indicted on federal campaign finance charges; the U.S. government alleged that Fieger had illegally funneled $127,000 to John Edwards's 2004 presidential campaign. Fieger was defended by attorney Gerry Spence, who announced this would be his last case. A jury acquitted Fieger of all 10 charges, and Fieger's co-defendant and law partner Ven Johnson on five charges, on June 2, 2008. Johnson stated that the charges were politically motivated.

In leadup to both the 2010, and 2018 gubernatorial elections in Michigan, Fieger considered running.

== Personal life ==
Fieger is a Unitarian. He and his wife Kathleen have three children and live in Bloomfield Hills, Michigan.

In 1997, Fieger donated four million dollars to the Detroit College of Law, now the Michigan State University College of Law, to start the nation's first trial practice institute for law students, which was named the Geoffrey Fieger Trial Practice Institute.

On March 1, 2024, Fieger's wife released a statement saying he was diagnosed with a heart condition that required surgery, and afterward he suffered a stroke. His long time law partner, James Harrington, is currently running Fieger Law, while Fieger is recovering and in rehabilitation.

Party political offices
Preceded by Howard Wolpe	Democratic nominee for Governor of Michigan; 1998	Succeeded by Jennifer Granholm
