= John Engler =

Governor of Michigan from 1991 to 2003

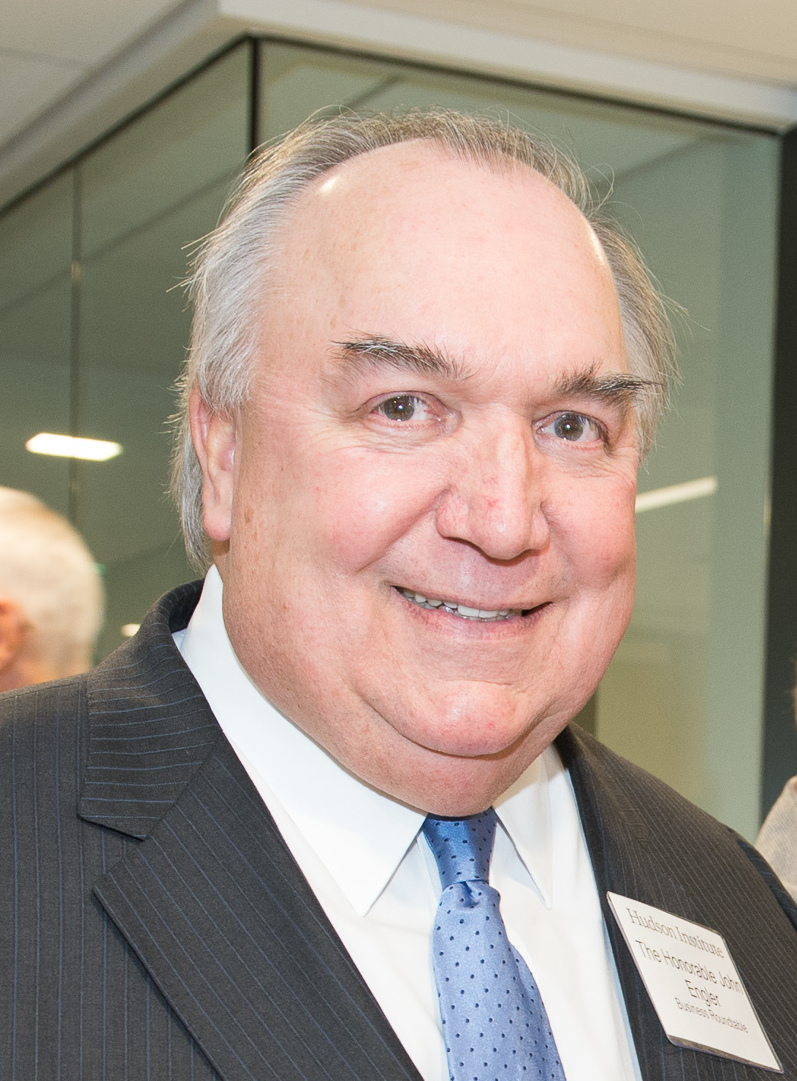
- Engler in 2016

Acting President of Michigan State University
- In office January 31, 2018 – January 17, 2019
- Preceded by: Lou Anna Simon
- Succeeded by: Satish Udpa (acting)

46th Governor of Michigan
- In office January 1, 1991 – January 1, 2003
- Lieutenant: Connie Binsfeld; Dick Posthumus
- Preceded by: James J. Blanchard
- Succeeded by: Jennifer Granholm

Chair of the National Governors Association
- In office August 7, 2001 – July 16, 2002
- Preceded by: Parris Glendening
- Succeeded by: Paul Patton

9th Majority Leader of the Michigan Senate
- In office 1984–1990
- Preceded by: William Faust
- Succeeded by: Dick Posthumus

Member of the Michigan Senate
- In office January 1, 1979 – December 31, 1990
- Preceded by: John Toepp
- Succeeded by: Joanne G. Emmons
- Constituency: 36th district (1979–1982); 35th district (1983–1990)

Member of the Michigan House of Representatives
- In office January 1, 1971 – December 31, 1978
- Preceded by: Russell Strange
- Succeeded by: Gary L. Randall
- Constituency: 100th district (1971–1972); 89th district (1973–1978)

Personal details
- Born: John Mathias Engler; October 12, 1948 (age 78) Mount Pleasant, Michigan, U.S.
- Party: Republican
- Spouses: Colleen House (m. 1975; div. 1986); Michelle DeMunbrun (m. 1990)
- Children: 3
- Education: Michigan State University (BS); Western Michigan University (JD)

John Mathias Engler (born October 12, 1948) is an American politician, lawyer, businessman, and lobbyist who served as the 46th governor of Michigan from 1991 to 2003. Considered one of the country's top lobbyists, he is a member of the Republican Party.

Engler was serving in the Michigan Senate when he enrolled at Thomas M. Cooley Law School and graduated with a Juris Doctor degree, having served as a Michigan state senator since 1979. He was elected Senate majority leader in 1984 and served there until being elected governor in 1990. He was reelected in 1994 and 1998, and is the last Michigan governor to serve more than two terms. After his governorship, he worked for Business Roundtable.

Engler served on the board of advisors of the Russell Kirk Center for Cultural Renewal, an educational organization that continues the intellectual legacy of noted conservative and Michigan native Russell Kirk. Engler also served on the board of trustees of the Marguerite Eyer Wilbur Foundation, which funds many Kirk Center programs. Engler was a member of the Annie E. Casey Foundation board of trustees until 2014. As of 2018, he serves on the board of directors of Universal Forest Products. Previous board service included serving as a director of Dow Jones and Delta Air Lines and as a trustee of Munder Funds.

== Early life and education ==
Engler, a Roman Catholic, was born in Mount Pleasant, Michigan, on October 12, 1948, to Mathias John Engler and his wife, Agnes Marie (née Neyer), but grew up on a cattle farm near Beal City.

He attended Michigan State University, graduating with a degree in agricultural economics in 1971, and Thomas M. Cooley Law School, graduating with a Doctor of Jurisprudence degree in 1981.

He was elected to the Michigan House of Representatives as a state representative in 1970 at the age of 22. He served in the House from 1971 to 1978. His campaign manager in that first election was a college friend, Dick Posthumus. Engler later became the first Republican youth vice-chair for the Michigan Republican Party, defeating future U.S. Senator Spencer Abraham. Posthumus later went on to be elected a state senator, Senate Majority Leader and Lieutenant Governor. He was Engler's running mate in the 1998 election and served from 1999 to 2003.

== Career ==
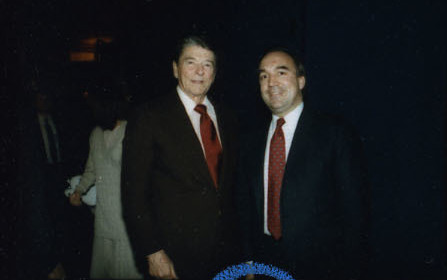
Engler with President Ronald Reagan in 1988

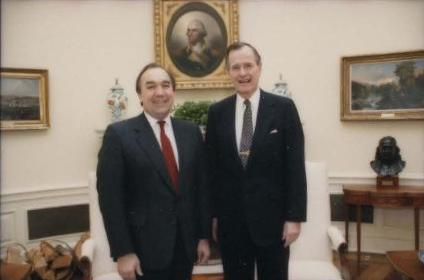
Engler with President George H. W. Bush in 1991

=== Governorship ===
Engler's administration was characterized by privatization of state services, income tax reduction, a sales tax increase, educational reform, welfare reform, and major reorganization of executive branch departments.

In 1996, he was elected chairman of the Republican Governors Association, and in 2001, he was elected to head the National Governors Association.

In 2002, near the end of his final term, Engler and the Michigan Department of Environmental Quality attempted to negotiate a consent order with Dow Chemical that would have resulted in a ninefold increase in the allowable levels of dioxins. The consent order would have resulted in Dow not having to pay to clean up high levels of toxins in Midland, Michigan, near its plant there, as well as in the Tittabawassee flood plain, which had been contaminated by dioxins dumped into the river from the facility and from overflow from waste ponds. The consent order fell through in late 2002.

=== Vice presidential speculation ===
==== 1996 ====
During the 1996 presidential election, Engler was considered to be a potential vice presidential running mate for Republican nominee Bob Dole. However, Dole instead selected Jack Kemp, a former representative and HUD secretary.

==== 2000 ====
Engler endorsed Texas Governor George W. Bush in the 2000 Republican primary. After Bush secured the GOP nomination, Engler's name was again floated as a possible running mate. In his book Decision Points, Bush says that Engler was someone he was "close" with and could "work well with." Ultimately, Engler was passed over for the running mate position in favor of Dick Cheney. After the election, Engler's close political ally Spencer Abraham, who narrowly lost his re-election bid for the Senate to Debbie Stabenow, was chosen as Bush's Secretary of Energy.

=== 2002 elections ===
Engler's lieutenant governor, Dick Posthumus, sought to succeed Engler in the 2002 gubernatorial race. Posthumus lost the race to the state's attorney general, Democrat Jennifer Granholm.

=== Election results ===
In 1990, Engler, then the state senate majority leader, challenged Governor James Blanchard in his bid for a third term. Political observers viewed his bid as a long shot, and he trailed Blanchard by double digits in the polls the weekend before the election. However, on election day, Engler pulled off the upset, defeating Blanchard by approximately 17,000 votes—a margin of less than one percentage point. In 1994, Engler ran for his second term. The Democrats nominated former Representative Howard Wolpe, who had close ties to the labor movement—a potent force in Democratic politics in Michigan. Engler bested Wolpe 61 to 39 percent, and the state Republican Party made significant gains. Spencer Abraham picked up the Senate seat of retiring Democrat Donald Riegle. Republicans gained a seat to break a tie in the state House of Representatives, taking a 56–54 majority, while also picking up a seat in the U.S. House of Representatives. Republican Candice Miller won an upset victory to win the post of Secretary of State.

Michigan voters re-elected Engler to his third and final term in 1998. He won a landslide victory over lawyer Geoffrey Fieger. Engler took 1,883,005 votes—62 percent of the total—to Fieger's 38 percent and 1,143,574 votes. Engler's landslide helped the state Republican Party gain six seats in the state House of Representatives, taking control of the chamber they had lost two years previously with a 58–52 margin, as well as picking up an additional seat in the State Senate, for a 23–15 majority. Republicans also gained a seat on the technically non-partisan state Supreme Court, holding a 4–3 majority over the Democrats.

=== Electoral history ===
Michigan Gubernatorial election, 1990
| Party | Candidate | Votes | % | ±% |
|---|---|---|---|---|
| Republican | John Engler | 1,287,320 | 49.8 | +18.4 |
| Democratic | James Blanchard (incumbent) | 1,276,134 | 49.1 | −19.0 |
| Workers World | William Roundtree | 28,091 | 1.1 | +0.7 |
| Write-ins | Write-ins | 1,799 | 0.1 | 0.0 |
| Majority | | 17,595 | 0.7 | −36.0 |
| Turnout | | 2,564,563 | | +0.7 |
| Republican gain from Democratic | | Swing | | |

Michigan gubernatorial election, 1994
| Party | Candidate | Votes | % | ±% |
|---|---|---|---|---|
| Republican | John Engler (incumbent) | 1,899,101 | 61.5 | +11.7 |
| Democratic | Howard Wolpe | 1,188,438 | 38.5 | −10.6 |
| Write-ins | | 1,538 | 0.1 | 0.0 |
| Majority | | 710,663 | 23.0 | −+12.3 |
| Turnout | | 3,089,077 | | +1.34 |
| Republican hold | | Swing | | |

Michigan gubernatorial election, 1998
| Party | Candidate | Votes | % | ±% |
|---|---|---|---|---|
| Republican | John Engler (incumbent) | 1,883,005 | 62.2 | +0.7 |
| Democratic | Geoffrey Fieger | 1,143,574 | 37.8 | −0.7 |
| Write-ins | Write-In | 525 | 0.01 | −0.09 |
| Majority | | 739,431 | 24.4 | +1.4 |
| Turnout | | 3,027,104 | | −0.02 |
| Republican hold | | Swing | | |

=== After governorship ===
After leaving the governor's mansion in January 2003, Engler served as president of the state and local government sector of Electronic Data Systems. Engler left that position in June 2004 to be elected president and CEO of the National Association of Manufacturers. Engler's tenure at the NAM ended in January 2011. In January 2011, Engler was named president of the Business Roundtable.

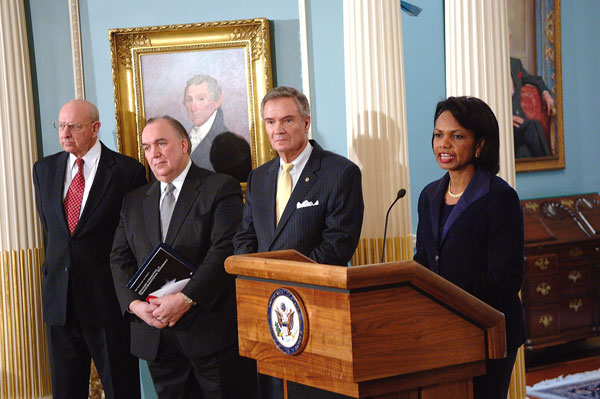
Secretary of State Condoleezza Rice with (left to right): Tom Pickering, John Engler and John Breaux at the presentation of final report of the Secretary's Advisory Committee on Transformational Diplomacy in 2008

In 2017, Engler was appointed to a four-year term on the governing board of the National Assessment of Educational Progress project.

=== Interim presidency of Michigan State University ===
On January 30, 2018, Engler was named the interim president of Michigan State University to replace Lou Anna Simon, who was embroiled with the school in the USA Gymnastics sex abuse scandal involving Larry Nassar. The appointment of Engler sparked controversy due to his previous handling of sexual misconduct as governor of Michigan. Engler's tenure as interim president was plagued by controversies, brought on by Engler's apparent callous statements and actions toward survivors during Board of Trustees meetings and statements that were reported by the press. One of Nassar's victims, Rachael Denhollander, said Engler "chose to stand against every child and every sexual assault victim in the entire state, to protect an institution."

Engler resigned on January 16, 2019 after the Board of Trustees indicated its intent to ask him to resign following a series of embarrassing incidents regarding Nassar's victims and his responses to issues in the aftermath. Engler initially indicated he planned to resign on January 23, 2019 but the Board required him to resign the morning after he submitted his resignation letter.

== Personal life ==
In 1975, Engler married Colleen House, who served in the Michigan House of Representatives before running for lieutenant governor of Michigan in 1986. The day after she lost the race for lieutenant governor, she filed for divorce. The couple had no children together; she remarried in 2002, and died in 2022.

Engler married Michelle DeMunbrun, a Texas attorney, on December 8, 1990. The couple has triplet daughters, born November 13, 1994. As First Lady, Michelle Engler served as the founding chair of the Michigan Community Service Commission. Michelle Engler was named to the Federal Home Loan Mortgage Corporation (Freddie Mac) board in 2001 by President George W. Bush, and re-appointed in 2002.

Michigan Senate
| Preceded by William Faust | Majority Leader of the Michigan Senate; 1984–1990 | Succeeded by Dick Posthumus |
Party political offices
| Preceded by Bill Lucas | Republican nominee for Governor of Michigan; 1990, 1994, 1998 | Succeeded by Dick Posthumus |
| Preceded by Mike Leavitt | Chair of the Republican Governors Association; 1995–1996 | Succeeded by Terry Branstad |
Political offices
| Preceded by Jim Blanchard | Governor of Michigan; 1991–2003 | Succeeded by Jennifer Granholm |
| Preceded by Parris Glendening | Chair of the National Governors Association; 2001–2002 | Succeeded by Paul Patton |
U.S. order of precedence (ceremonial)
| Preceded by James Blanchard as Former Governor | Order of precedence of the United States | Succeeded by Rick Snyder as Former Governor |
