= All Saints Central High School =

Location
- 217 South Monroe Street; Bay City, Michigan 48708; United States; 43°35′19″N 83°53′3″W

Information
- Type: Private, coeducational
- Religious affiliation: Roman Catholic
- Superintendent: Cormac Lynn
- Grades: 9–12
- Enrollment: 133 (2014-2015)
- Colors: Columbia blue and white
- Athletics conference: Greater Thumb Conference
- Mascot: Xavier Cougar
- Team name: Cougars
- Accreditation: Michigan Association of Non-Public Schools
- Yearbook: The Saint
- Website: http://www.ascbaycity.org

All Saints Central High School is a private Roman Catholic high school located in Bay City, Michigan, United States. It is located in the Diocese of Saginaw. It is part of a grouping of schools: All Saints Central Elementary, All Saints Central Middle/High School and Little Saints Childcare Center.

In 1967, a University of Michigan study group recommended all east side Bay City Catholic high schools form one central high school. A joint team from the existing schools (St. James, St. Stanislaus, and St. Joseph schools) merged to form All Saints Central. The new school opened in September 1968, with a faculty composed of religious from the Sisters of Charity, the Grand Rapids Dominicans, and the Felician Sisters, as well as lay faculty members.

All Saints had 164 students enrolled in 2009. Students attend mass at St. James Church every week and are required to complete 100 community service hours before they graduate.

== Athletics ==
All Saints athletic teams are known as the Cougars. The following sports are offered at the school:

- Baseball (boys')
- Basketball (boys' & girls')
- Bowling (boys' & girls')
- Football (boys')
- Softball (girls')
- Tennis (boys' & girls')
- Volleyball (girls')

== Notable alumni ==
- Colleen House (Class of 1969), member of the Michigan House of Representatives (1974–1976, 1983–1986)
