= 1990 Michigan gubernatorial election =

- November 6, 1990
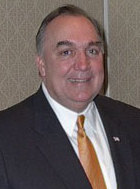

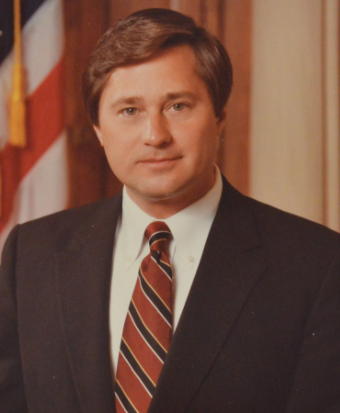
| Nominee | John Engler | James J. Blanchard |
| Party | Republican | Democratic |
| Running mate | Connie Binsfeld | Olivia P. Maynard |
| Popular vote | 1,276,134 | 1,258,539 |
| Percentage | 49.76% | 49.07% |
- County results Engler: 40–50% 50–60% 60–70% 70–80% Blanchard: 40–50% 50–60% 60–70%
Governor before election
James J. Blanchard
Democratic
Elected Governor
John Engler
Republican

The 1990 Michigan gubernatorial election was held on November 6, 1990, to elect the Governor and Lieutenant Governor of the state of Michigan. State Senate Majority Leader John Engler, a member of the Republican Party, was elected over incumbent Democratic Governor James Blanchard, who was seeking his third term.

In what turned out to be one of the closest elections in recent Michigan history, Engler defeated Blanchard by less than 18,000 votes and a 0.7% margin. Engler's victory was considered a major upset and became infamous among pollsters. The final Detroit News poll showed Engler trailing by 14 points, and the final Detroit Free Press poll showed Engler behind by 4 points. A retrospective of the polling suggests the News poll may have had questions that favored Blanchard and too heavily incorporated the opinions of registered voters rather than likely voters, and thus failed to correctly gauge turnout.

The voter turnout was 38.6%. This was the first time since 1974 and the last time until 2022 that the state elected a governor of the same party as the sitting president. As of 2026, this is the last Michigan gubernatorial election in which the incumbent was defeated.

== Democratic primary ==
=== Candidates ===
- James J. Blanchard, incumbent governor

=== Campaign ===
James Blanchard, a two-term incumbent, won the Democratic primary unopposed. He created controversy in the summer 1990 with speculation that he might drop lieutenant governor Martha Griffiths from the Democratic ticket. There was speculation that Blanchard was positioning to appoint himself to replace Donald W. Riegle Jr. in the United States Senate should Riegle have to resign due to his involvement in the Keating Five scandal and being under investigation by the Senate Ethics Committee and wanted a younger running mate to take over as governor. After weeks of speculation, Griffiths, 78, offered to remove herself from the ticket and not formally seek the Democratic nomination for lieutenant governor at the Michigan Democratic Convention. Olivia P. Maynard, who was the Director of the Michigan Office of Services to the Aging, was ultimately chosen as Blanchard's running mate.

Ultimately, Riegle survived the scandal but the scandal along with the unpopularity of Bill Clinton, led to Riegle announcing that he would not seek re-election and he left the Senate at the end of his term on January 3, 1995.

=== Results ===
Democratic primary results
| Party | Candidate | Votes | % |
|---|---|---|---|
| Democratic | James J. Blanchard (inc.) | 371,962 | 99.98% |
| Democratic | Scattering | 62 | 0.02% |
| Total votes | | 372,024 | 100.00% |

== Republican primary ==
=== Candidates ===
- John Engler, majority leader of Michigan Senate
- John Lauve, retired General Motors engineer and perennial candidate

=== Campaign ===
State Senate Majority Leader John Engler faced nominal opposition in the primary, easily defeating retired General Motors engineer and perennial political candidate John Lauve. Engler then chose state Sen. Connie Binsfeld as his running mate.

=== Results ===
Republican primary results
| Party | Candidate | Votes | % |
|---|---|---|---|
| Republican | John Engler | 409,747 | 86.59% |
| Republican | John Lauve | 63,457 | 13.41% |
| Republican | Scattering | 19 | 0.00% |
| Total votes | | 473,223 | 100.00% |

== General election ==
=== Candidates ===
Major party candidates

- James J. Blanchard & Olivia P. Maynard, Democratic
- John Engler & Connie Binsfeld, Republican

Other candidates

- William Roundtree & Brenda Kirby, Workers World

=== Results ===
1990 Michigan gubernatorial election
| Party | Candidate | Votes | % | ±% |
|---|---|---|---|---|
| Republican | John Engler | 1,276,134 | 49.76% | +18.31% |
| Democratic | James J. Blanchard (inc.) | 1,258,539 | 49.07% | −19.03% |
| Workers World | William Roundtree | 28,091 | 1.10% | |
| | Scattering | 1,799 | 0.07% | |
| Plurality | | 17,995 | 0.69% | |
| Total votes | | 2,564,563 | 100.00% | |
| Republican gain from Democratic | | Swing | +37.34% | |

==== Results by county ====
| County | John Engler Republican | | James J. Blanchard Democratic | | William Roundtree Workers World | | Scattering Write-in | | Margin | | Total votes cast |
| County | # | % | # | % | # | % | # | % | # | % | Total votes cast |
|---|---|---|---|---|---|---|---|---|---|---|---|
| Alcona | 2,031 | 60.48% | 1,313 | 39.10% | 14 | 0.42% | 0 | 0.00% | 718 | 21.38% | 3,358 |
| Alger | 1,700 | 48.15% | 1,821 | 51.57% | 10 | 0.28% | 0 | 0.00% | -121 | -3.43% | 3,531 |
| Allegan | 16,342 | 66.65% | 7,934 | 32.36% | 205 | 0.84% | 39 | 0.16% | 8,408 | 34.29% | 24,520 |
| Alpena | 4,333 | 49.75% | 4,319 | 49.59% | 58 | 0.67% | 0 | 0.00% | 14 | 0.16% | 8,710 |
| Antrim | 3,572 | 56.42% | 2,711 | 42.82% | 48 | 0.76% | 0 | 0.00% | 861 | 13.60% | 6,331 |
| Arenac | 1,937 | 45.37% | 2,305 | 53.99% | 25 | 0.59% | 2 | 0.05% | -368 | -8.62% | 4,269 |
| Baraga | 1,298 | 52.11% | 1,181 | 47.41% | 12 | 0.48% | 0 | 0.00% | 117 | 4.70% | 2,491 |
| Barry | 8,785 | 60.41% | 5,567 | 38.28% | 166 | 1.14% | 25 | 0.17% | 3,218 | 22.13% | 14,543 |
| Bay | 14,886 | 42.82% | 19,646 | 56.51% | 214 | 0.62% | 20 | 0.06% | -4,760 | -13.69% | 34,766 |
| Benzie | 2,305 | 54.22% | 1,917 | 45.10% | 27 | 0.64% | 2 | 0.05% | 388 | 9.13% | 4,251 |
| Berrien | 24,019 | 63.47% | 13,480 | 35.62% | 344 | 0.91% | 2 | 0.01% | 10,539 | 27.85% | 37,845 |
| Branch | 5,946 | 60.74% | 3,778 | 38.59% | 62 | 0.63% | 3 | 0.03% | 2,168 | 22.15% | 9,789 |
| Calhoun | 18,819 | 51.99% | 16,823 | 46.48% | 539 | 1.49% | 15 | 0.04% | 1,996 | 5.51% | 36,196 |
| Cass | 6,149 | 58.53% | 4,308 | 41.01% | 48 | 0.46% | 0 | 0.00% | 1,841 | 17.52% | 10,505 |
| Charlevoix | 3,863 | 54.31% | 3,109 | 43.71% | 141 | 1.98% | 0 | 0.00% | 754 | 10.60% | 7,113 |
| Cheboygan | 3,461 | 54.15% | 2,895 | 45.29% | 36 | 0.56% | 0 | 0.00% | 566 | 8.85% | 6,392 |
| Chippewa | 4,442 | 49.50% | 4,493 | 50.07% | 39 | 0.43% | 0 | 0.00% | -51 | -0.57% | 8,974 |
| Clare | 3,741 | 48.95% | 3,765 | 49.27% | 130 | 1.70% | 6 | 0.08% | -24 | -0.31% | 7,642 |
| Clinton | 11,023 | 56.04% | 8,412 | 42.77% | 216 | 1.10% | 18 | 0.09% | 2,611 | 13.27% | 19,669 |
| Crawford | 1,961 | 60.90% | 1,197 | 37.17% | 60 | 1.86% | 2 | 0.06% | 764 | 23.73% | 3,220 |
| Delta | 5,155 | 43.42% | 6,675 | 56.22% | 41 | 0.35% | 1 | 0.01% | -1,520 | -12.80% | 11,872 |
| Dickinson | 4,190 | 46.52% | 4,803 | 53.33% | 14 | 0.16% | 0 | 0.00% | -613 | -6.81% | 9,007 |
| Eaton | 16,264 | 53.15% | 13,818 | 45.16% | 516 | 1.69% | 0 | 0.00% | 2,446 | 7.99% | 30,598 |
| Emmet | 4,338 | 55.52% | 3,343 | 42.78% | 128 | 1.64% | 5 | 0.06% | 995 | 12.73% | 7,814 |
| Genesee | 45,456 | 39.80% | 67,057 | 58.71% | 1,676 | 1.47% | 34 | 0.03% | -21,601 | -18.91% | 114,223 |
| Gladwin | 3,097 | 48.56% | 3,170 | 49.70% | 109 | 1.71% | 2 | 0.03% | -73 | -1.14% | 6,378 |
| Gogebic | 2,089 | 34.26% | 3,989 | 65.41% | 20 | 0.33% | 0 | 0.00% | -1,900 | -31.16% | 6,098 |
| Grand Traverse | 12,344 | 58.77% | 8,519 | 40.56% | 142 | 0.68% | 0 | 0.00% | 3,825 | 18.21% | 21,005 |
| Gratiot | 5,283 | 51.94% | 4,799 | 47.18% | 87 | 0.86% | 2 | 0.02% | 484 | 4.76% | 10,171 |
| Hillsdale | 6,779 | 63.46% | 3,823 | 35.79% | 72 | 0.67% | 9 | 0.08% | 2,956 | 27.67% | 10,683 |
| Houghton | 5,696 | 54.56% | 4,686 | 44.89% | 57 | 0.55% | 1 | 0.01% | 1,010 | 9.67% | 10,440 |
| Huron | 6,365 | 56.96% | 4,769 | 42.68% | 39 | 0.35% | 1 | 0.01% | 1,596 | 14.28% | 11,174 |
| Ingham | 34,878 | 41.90% | 46,143 | 55.44% | 2,068 | 2.48% | 145 | 0.17% | -11,265 | -13.53% | 83,234 |
| Ionia | 8,721 | 56.18% | 6,658 | 42.89% | 122 | 0.79% | 23 | 0.15% | 2,063 | 13.29% | 15,524 |
| Iosco | 4,258 | 51.34% | 3,904 | 47.08% | 130 | 1.57% | 1 | 0.01% | 354 | 4.27% | 8,293 |
| Iron | 2,397 | 48.62% | 2,512 | 50.95% | 20 | 0.41% | 1 | 0.02% | -115 | -2.33% | 4,930 |
| Isabella | 6,913 | 50.60% | 6,541 | 47.87% | 202 | 1.48% | 7 | 0.05% | 372 | 2.72% | 13,663 |
| Jackson | 22,051 | 56.28% | 16,702 | 42.63% | 430 | 1.10% | 0 | 0.00% | 5,349 | 13.65% | 39,183 |
| Kalamazoo | 30,431 | 50.44% | 29,086 | 48.21% | 812 | 1.35% | 0 | 0.00% | 1,345 | 2.23% | 60,329 |
| Kalkaska | 2,289 | 60.80% | 1,450 | 38.51% | 26 | 0.69% | 0 | 0.00% | 839 | 22.28% | 3,765 |
| Kent | 95,254 | 64.47% | 50,060 | 33.88% | 2,237 | 1.51% | 196 | 0.13% | 45,194 | 30.59% | 147,747 |
| Keweenaw | 449 | 50.34% | 442 | 49.55% | 1 | 0.11% | 0 | 0.00% | 7 | 0.78% | 892 |
| Lake | 1,385 | 48.17% | 1,423 | 49.50% | 66 | 2.30% | 1 | 0.03% | -38 | -1.32% | 2,875 |
| Lapeer | 11,792 | 59.32% | 7,639 | 38.43% | 422 | 2.12% | 25 | 0.13% | 4,153 | 20.89% | 19,878 |
| Leelanau | 3,757 | 58.53% | 2,620 | 40.82% | 29 | 0.45% | 13 | 0.20% | 1,137 | 17.71% | 6,419 |
| Lenawee | 13,753 | 54.79% | 11,239 | 44.77% | 103 | 0.41% | 7 | 0.03% | 2,514 | 10.02% | 25,102 |
| Livingston | 21,102 | 62.40% | 12,162 | 35.96% | 535 | 1.58% | 21 | 0.06% | 8,940 | 26.43% | 33,820 |
| Luce | 1,053 | 51.29% | 994 | 48.42% | 6 | 0.29% | 0 | 0.00% | 59 | 2.87% | 2,053 |
| Mackinac | 2,206 | 53.39% | 1,901 | 46.01% | 25 | 0.61% | 0 | 0.00% | 305 | 7.38% | 4,132 |
| Macomb | 110,387 | 52.75% | 96,088 | 45.91% | 2,668 | 1.27% | 141 | 0.07% | 14,299 | 6.83% | 209,284 |
| Manistee | 4,289 | 55.55% | 3,386 | 43.85% | 46 | 0.60% | 0 | 0.00% | 903 | 11.70% | 7,721 |
| Marquette | 7,305 | 40.35% | 10,676 | 58.97% | 122 | 0.67% | 0 | 0.00% | -3,371 | -18.62% | 18,103 |
| Mason | 5,138 | 55.82% | 3,964 | 43.07% | 99 | 1.08% | 3 | 0.03% | 1,174 | 12.76% | 9,204 |
| Mecosta | 5,170 | 55.86% | 4,019 | 43.43% | 61 | 0.66% | 5 | 0.05% | 1,151 | 12.44% | 9,255 |
| Menominee | 2,979 | 45.44% | 3,559 | 54.29% | 18 | 0.27% | 0 | 0.00% | -580 | -8.85% | 6,556 |
| Midland | 13,087 | 49.94% | 12,783 | 48.78% | 317 | 1.21% | 19 | 0.07% | 304 | 1.16% | 26,206 |
| Missaukee | 2,585 | 65.28% | 1,306 | 32.98% | 69 | 1.74% | 0 | 0.00% | 1,279 | 32.30% | 3,960 |
| Monroe | 16,865 | 52.91% | 14,811 | 46.47% | 199 | 0.62% | 0 | 0.00% | 2,054 | 6.44% | 31,875 |
| Montcalm | 8,036 | 57.29% | 5,863 | 41.79% | 114 | 0.81% | 15 | 0.11% | 2,173 | 15.49% | 14,028 |
| Montmorency | 1,556 | 60.69% | 997 | 38.88% | 11 | 0.43% | 0 | 0.00% | 559 | 21.80% | 2,564 |
| Muskegon | 21,519 | 49.16% | 21,948 | 50.14% | 288 | 0.66% | 15 | 0.03% | -429 | -0.98% | 43,770 |
| Newaygo | 6,902 | 62.12% | 4,120 | 37.08% | 89 | 0.80% | 0 | 0.00% | 2,782 | 25.04% | 11,111 |
| Oakland | 172,462 | 52.40% | 153,429 | 46.62% | 2,848 | 0.87% | 373 | 0.11% | 19,033 | 5.78% | 329,112 |
| Oceana | 3,933 | 57.94% | 2,794 | 41.16% | 60 | 0.88% | 1 | 0.01% | 1,139 | 16.78% | 6,788 |
| Ogemaw | 2,824 | 47.92% | 2,981 | 50.59% | 86 | 1.46% | 2 | 0.03% | -157 | -2.66% | 5,893 |
| Ontonagon | 1,699 | 49.90% | 1,687 | 49.54% | 19 | 0.56% | 0 | 0.00% | 12 | 0.35% | 3,405 |
| Osceola | 3,436 | 59.51% | 2,299 | 39.82% | 39 | 0.68% | 0 | 0.00% | 1,137 | 19.69% | 5,774 |
| Oscoda | 1,361 | 60.84% | 839 | 37.51% | 37 | 1.65% | 0 | 0.00% | 522 | 23.33% | 2,237 |
| Otsego | 3,241 | 56.83% | 2,400 | 42.08% | 62 | 1.09% | 0 | 0.00% | 841 | 14.75% | 5,703 |
| Ottawa | 43,993 | 72.90% | 15,888 | 26.33% | 338 | 0.56% | 125 | 0.21% | 28,105 | 46.57% | 60,344 |
| Presque Isle | 2,328 | 51.20% | 2,168 | 47.68% | 50 | 1.10% | 1 | 0.02% | 160 | 3.52% | 4,547 |
| Roscommon | 3,891 | 52.43% | 3,478 | 46.86% | 53 | 0.71% | 0 | 0.00% | 413 | 5.56% | 7,422 |
| Saginaw | 29,130 | 44.22% | 36,036 | 54.70% | 681 | 1.03% | 31 | 0.05% | -6,906 | -10.48% | 65,878 |
| Sanilac | 7,778 | 61.90% | 4,732 | 37.66% | 55 | 0.44% | 1 | 0.01% | 3,046 | 24.24% | 12,566 |
| Schoolcraft | 1,332 | 42.58% | 1,786 | 57.10% | 10 | 0.32% | 0 | 0.00% | -454 | -14.51% | 3,128 |
| Shiawassee | 10,473 | 48.88% | 10,751 | 50.17% | 174 | 0.81% | 30 | 0.14% | -278 | -1.30% | 21,428 |
| St. Clair | 22,858 | 58.33% | 15,757 | 40.21% | 558 | 1.42% | 13 | 0.03% | 7,101 | 18.12% | 39,186 |
| St. Joseph | 8,661 | 61.19% | 5,404 | 38.18% | 87 | 0.61% | 3 | 0.02% | 3,257 | 23.01% | 14,155 |
| Tuscola | 8,118 | 53.17% | 7,046 | 46.15% | 104 | 0.68% | 0 | 0.00% | 1,072 | 7.02% | 15,268 |
| Van Buren | 9,827 | 57.10% | 7,230 | 42.01% | 143 | 0.83% | 10 | 0.06% | 2,597 | 15.09% | 17,210 |
| Washtenaw | 32,942 | 42.29% | 43,934 | 56.40% | 913 | 1.17% | 104 | 0.13% | -10,992 | -14.11% | 77,893 |
| Wayne | 175,344 | 35.81% | 308,902 | 63.09% | 5,098 | 1.04% | 273 | 0.06% | -133,558 | -27.28% | 489,617 |
| Wexford | 4,327 | 54.39% | 3,577 | 44.97% | 46 | 0.58% | 5 | 0.06% | 750 | 9.43% | 7,955 |
| Total | 1,276,134 | 49.76% | 1,258,539 | 49.07% | 28,091 | 1.10% | 1,799 | 0.07% | 17,595 | 0.69% | 2,564,563 |

===== Counties that flipped from Democratic to Republican =====
- Alcona
- Allegan
- Alpena
- Antrim
- Baraga
- Barry
- Benzie
- Berrien
- Branch
- Calhoun
- Cass
- Charlevoix
- Cheboygan
- Clinton
- Crawford
- Eaton
- Emmet
- Grand Traverse
- Gratiot
- Hillsdale
- Houghton
- Huron
- Ionia
- Iosco
- Isabella
- Jackson
- Kalamazoo
- Kalkaska
- Kent
- Keweenaw
- Lapeer
- Leelanau
- Lenawee
- Livingston
- Luce
- Mackinac
- Macomb
- Manistee
- Mason
- Mecosta
- Midland
- Missaukee
- Monroe
- Montcalm
- Montmorency
- Newaygo
- Oakland
- Oceana
- Ontonagon
- Osceola
- Oscoda
- Otsego
- Presque Isle
- Roscommon
- Sanilac
- St. Clair
- St. Joseph
- Tuscola
- Van Buren
- Wexford
