= Jack Kevorkian =

American pathologist and euthanasia activist (1928–2011)

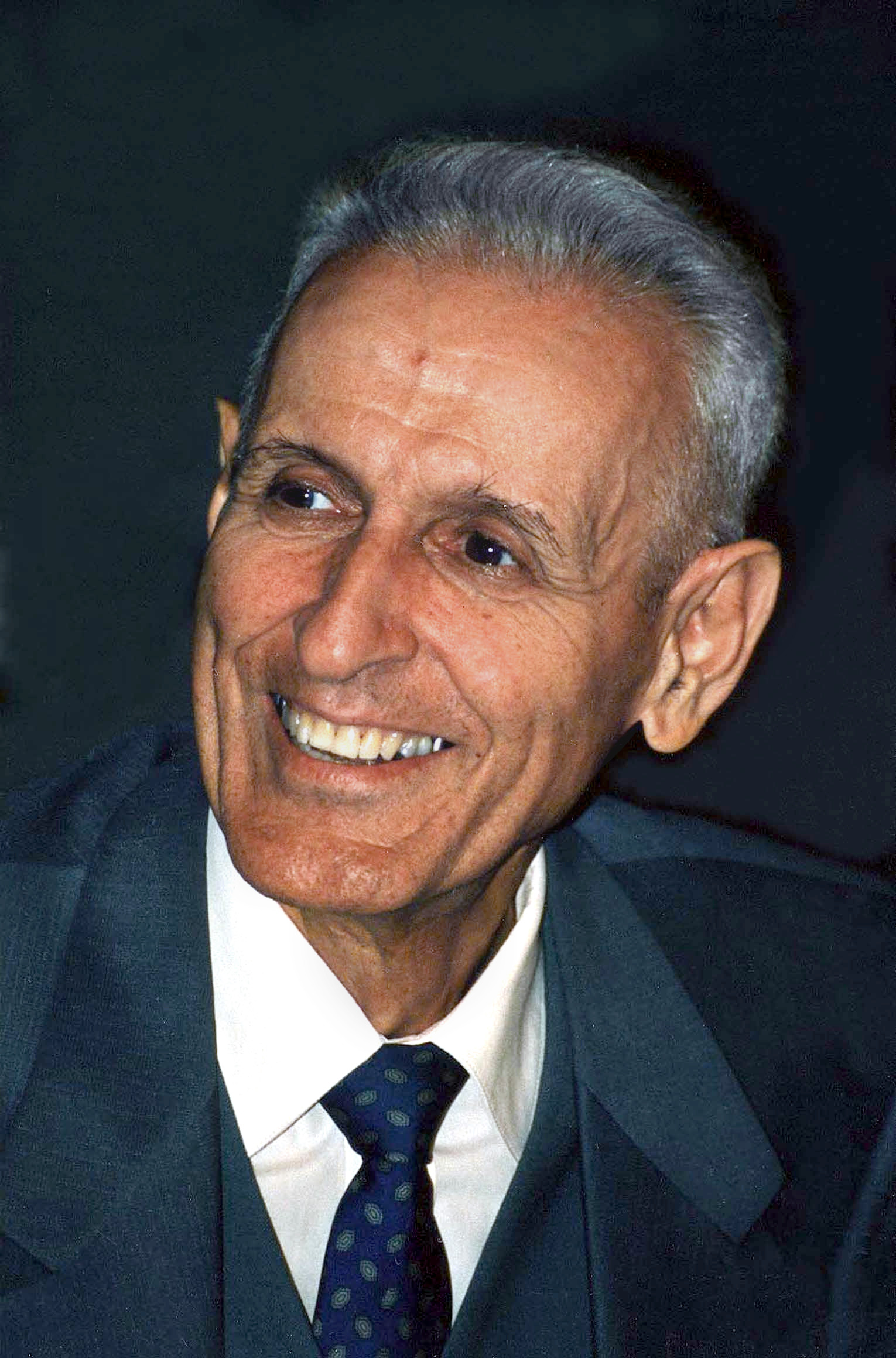
- Kevorkian in 1996
- Born: Murad Jacob Kevorkian; May 26, 1928; Pontiac, Michigan, U.S.
- Died: June 3, 2011 (aged 83); Royal Oak, Michigan, U.S.
- Education: University of Michigan (MD)
- Occupation: Pathologist
- Years active: 1952–2011
- Medical career
- Institutions: Henry Ford Hospital; Michigan Medicine
- Sub-specialties: Euthanasia medicine
- Criminal information

Details
- Date: September 17, 1998
- Killed: 1 (convicted)

Murad Jacob Kevorkian (May 26, 1928 – June 3, 2011), also known by the nickname "Dr. Death", was an American pathologist and euthanasia proponent. He publicly championed a terminal patient's right to die by physician-assisted suicide, embodied in his quote, "Dying is not a crime". Kevorkian said that he assisted at least 130 patients to that end. He was convicted of murder in 1999.

Kevorkian was tried four times for assisting suicides between 1994 and 1997, being acquitted the first three times and the fourth ending in a mistrial. In 1998, Kevorkian was arrested and tried for murder after broadcasting the voluntary euthanasia of a man named Thomas Youk who had Lou Gehrig's disease, or ALS. He was convicted of second-degree murder and served eight years of a 10-to-25-year prison sentence. He was released on parole on June 1, 2007, on condition he would not offer advice about, participate in, or be present at the act of any type of euthanasia to any other person, nor that he promote or talk about the procedure of assisted suicide.

== Early life and education ==
Murad Jacob Kevorkian (Armenian: Մուրատ Յակոբ Գէորգեան) was born on May 26, 1928, in Pontiac, Michigan, a suburb of Detroit. to Armenian immigrants from the Ottoman Empire, in what is now Turkey. His father, Levon (1891–1960), was born in the village of Passen, near Erzurum, and his mother, Satenig (1900–1968), was born in the village of Govdun, near Sivas. His father left Ottoman Armenia and made his way to Pontiac in 1912, where he found work at an automobile foundry. Satenig fled the Armenian genocide of 1915, finding refuge with relatives in Paris and eventually reuniting with her brother in Pontiac. Levon and Satenig met through the Armenian community in their city, where they married and began their family. The couple had a daughter, Margaret, in 1926, followed by son Murad, and their third and last child, Flora.

When Kevorkian was a child, his parents took him to an Orthodox church weekly. He started questioning the existence of a God, as he believed an all-knowing God would have prevented the Armenian genocide on his extended family. He stopped attending church by the time he was 12.

Kevorkian was a child prodigy, teaching himself multiple languages (including German, Russian, Greek, and Japanese). As such, he was often alienated by his peers. Kevorkian graduated from Pontiac Central High School with honors in 1945, at the age of 17. In 1952, he graduated from the University of Michigan Medical School in Ann Arbor.

Kevorkian completed residency training in anatomical and clinical pathology and briefly conducted research on blood transfusion.

== Career ==
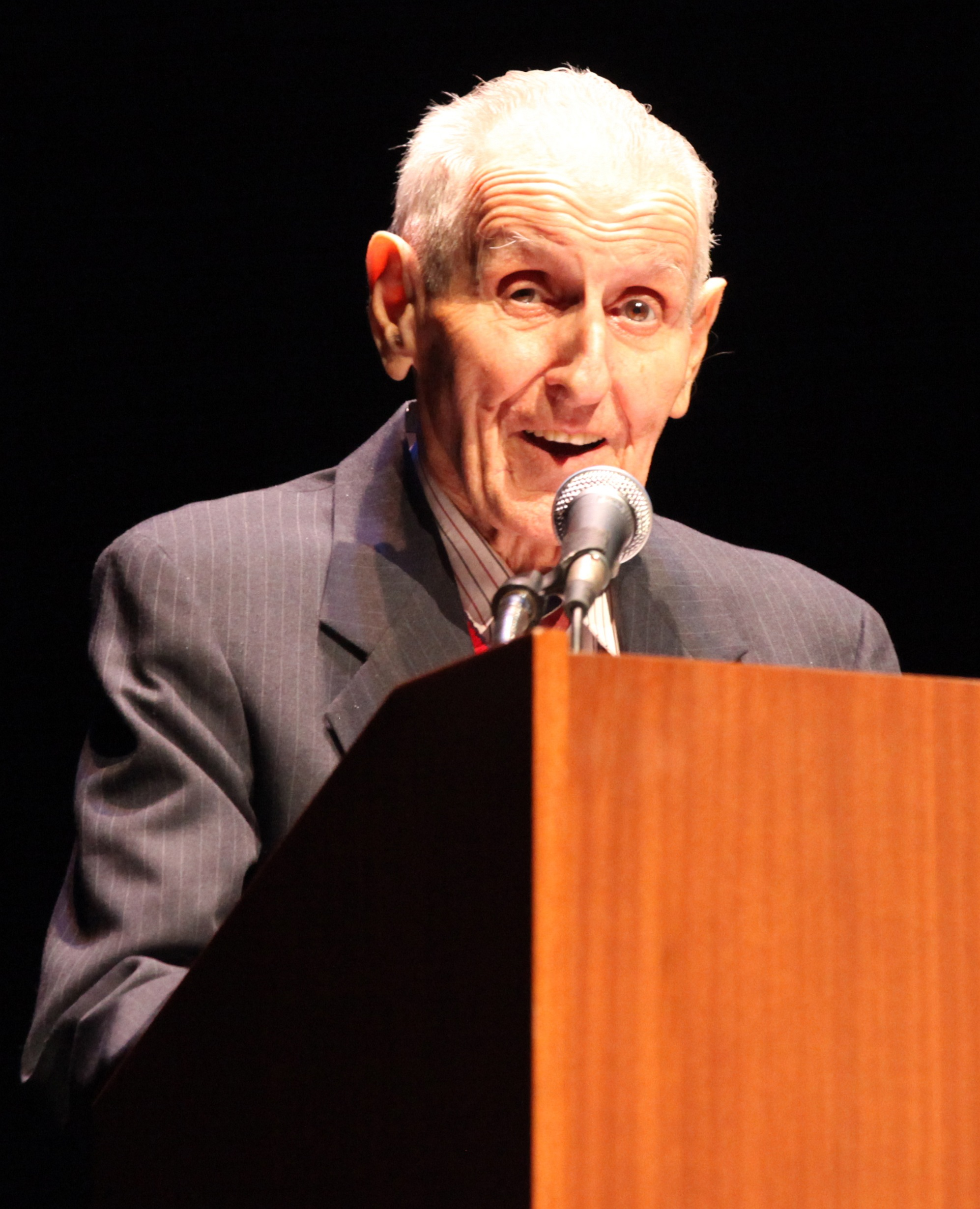
Kevorkian in 2011

Over a period of decades, Kevorkian developed several controversial ideas related to death. In a 1959 journal article, he wrote:

I propose that a prisoner condemned to death by due process of law be allowed to submit, by his own free choice, to medical experimentation under complete anaesthesia (at the time appointed for administering the penalty) as a form of execution in lieu of conventional methods prescribed by law.

Senior doctors at the University of Michigan, Kevorkian's employer, opposed his proposal, and Kevorkian chose to leave the university rather than stop advocating his ideas. Ultimately, he gained little support for his plan. He returned to the idea of using death-row inmates for medical purposes after the Supreme Court's 1976 decision in Gregg v. Georgia reinstituted the death penalty. He advocated harvesting the organs from inmates after the death penalty was carried out for transplant into sick patients, but he failed to gain the cooperation of prison officials.

As a pathologist at Pontiac General Hospital, Kevorkian experimented with transfusing blood from the recently deceased into live patients. He drew blood from corpses recently brought into the hospital and transferred it successfully into the bodies of hospital staff members. Kevorkian thought that the U.S. military might be interested in using this technique to help wounded soldiers during a battle, but the Pentagon was not interested.

In the 1980s, Kevorkian wrote a series of articles for the German journal Medicine and Law that laid out his thinking on the ethics of euthanasia.

In 1987, Kevorkian started advertising in Detroit newspapers as a physician consultant for "death counseling". His first public assisted suicide, of Janet Adkins, a 54-year-old woman diagnosed in 1989 with Alzheimer's disease, took place in 1990. Charges of murder were dropped on December 13, 1990, as there were, at that time, no laws in Michigan regarding assisted suicide. In 1991, however, the State of Michigan revoked Kevorkian's medical license and made it clear that, given his actions, he was no longer permitted to practice medicine or to work with patients. His California medical license was suspended in April 1993 by an administrative law judge, with Kevorkian's attorney responding that Kevorkian "will go on assisting people commit suicide. He dares that California judge to come catch him".

According to his lawyer Geoffrey Fieger, Kevorkian assisted in the deaths of 130 terminally ill people between 1990 and 1998. In each of these cases, the individuals themselves allegedly took the final action which resulted in their own deaths. Kevorkian allegedly assisted only by attaching the individual to a euthanasia device that he had devised and constructed. The individual then pushed a button which released the drugs or chemicals that would end their own life. Two deaths were assisted by means of a device which delivered the euthanizing drugs intravenously. Kevorkian called the device a "Thanatron" ("Death machine", from the Greek thanatos meaning "death"). Other people were assisted by a device which employed a gas mask fed by a canister of carbon monoxide, which Kevorkian called the "Mercitron" ("Mercy machine").

=== Criticism and Kevorkian's response ===
My aim in helping the patient was not to cause death. My aim was to end suffering. It's got to be decriminalized.

— Jack Kevorkian

According to a report by the Detroit Free Press, 60% of the patients who died with Kevorkian's help were not terminally ill, and at least 13 had not complained of pain. The report further asserted that Kevorkian's counseling was too brief (with at least 19 patients dying less than 24 hours after first meeting Kevorkian) and lacked a psychiatric exam in at least 19 cases, 5 of which involved people with histories of depression, though Kevorkian was sometimes alerted that the patient was unhappy for reasons other than their medical condition. In 1992, Kevorkian himself wrote that it is always necessary to consult a psychiatrist when performing assisted suicides because a person's "mental state is [...] of paramount importance." The report also stated that Kevorkian failed to refer at least 17 patients to a pain specialist after they complained of chronic pain and sometimes failed to obtain a complete medical record for his patients, with at least three autopsies of suicides Kevorkian had assisted with showing the person who committed suicide to have no physical sign of disease. Rebecca Badger, a patient of Kevorkian's and a mentally troubled drug abuser, had been mistakenly diagnosed with multiple sclerosis. The report also stated that Janet Adkins, Kevorkian's first euthanasia patient, had been chosen without Kevorkian ever speaking to her, only with her husband, and that when Kevorkian first met Adkins two days before her assisted suicide he "made no real effort to discover whether Ms. Adkins wished to end her life," as the Michigan Court of Appeals put it in a 1995 ruling upholding an order against Kevorkian's activity. According to The Economist: "Studies of those who sought out Dr. Kevorkian, however, suggest that though many had a worsening illness... it was not usually terminal. Autopsies showed five people had no disease at all... Little over a third were in pain. Some presumably suffered from no more than hypochondria or depression."

In response, Kevorkian's attorney Geoffrey Fieger published an essay stating, "I've never met any doctor who lived by such exacting guidelines as Kevorkian... [H]e published them in an article for the American Journal of Forensic Psychiatry in 1992. Last year he got a committee of doctors, the Physicians of Mercy, to lay down new guidelines, which he scrupulously follows." However, Fieger stated that Kevorkian found it difficult to follow his "exacting guidelines" because of "persecution and prosecution", adding, "[H]e's proposed these guidelines saying this is what ought to be done. These are not to be done in times of war, and we're at war."

In a 2010 interview with Sanjay Gupta, Kevorkian stated an objection to the status of assisted suicide in Oregon, Washington, and Montana. At that time, only in those three states was assisted suicide legal in the United States, and then only for terminally ill patients. To Gupta, Kevorkian stated, "What difference does it make if someone is terminal? We are all terminal." In his view, a patient had to be suffering but did not have to be terminally ill to be assisted in committing suicide. However, he also said in that same interview that he declined four out of every five assisted suicide requests, on the grounds that the patient needed more treatment or medical records had to be checked.

In 2011, disability rights and anti-legalization of assisted suicide and euthanasia group Not Dead Yet spoke out against Kevorkian, citing potentially concerning sentiments he expressed in his published writing. On page 214 of Prescription: Medicide, the Goodness of Planned Death, Kevorkian wrote that assisting "suffering or doomed persons [to] kill themselves" was "merely the first step, an early distasteful professional obligation... What I find most satisfying is the prospect of making possible the performance of invaluable experiments or other beneficial medical acts under conditions that this first unpleasant step can help establish – in a [portmanteau] word obitiatry." In a journal article titled "The Last Fearsome Taboo: Medical Aspects of Planned Death", Kevorkian also detailed anesthetizing, experimenting on, and utilizing the organs of a disabled newborn as a token of "daring and highly imaginative research" that would be possible "beyond the constraints of traditional but outmoded, hopelessly inadequate, and essentially irrelevant ethical codes now sustained for the most part by vacuous sentimental reverence".

=== Art and music ===
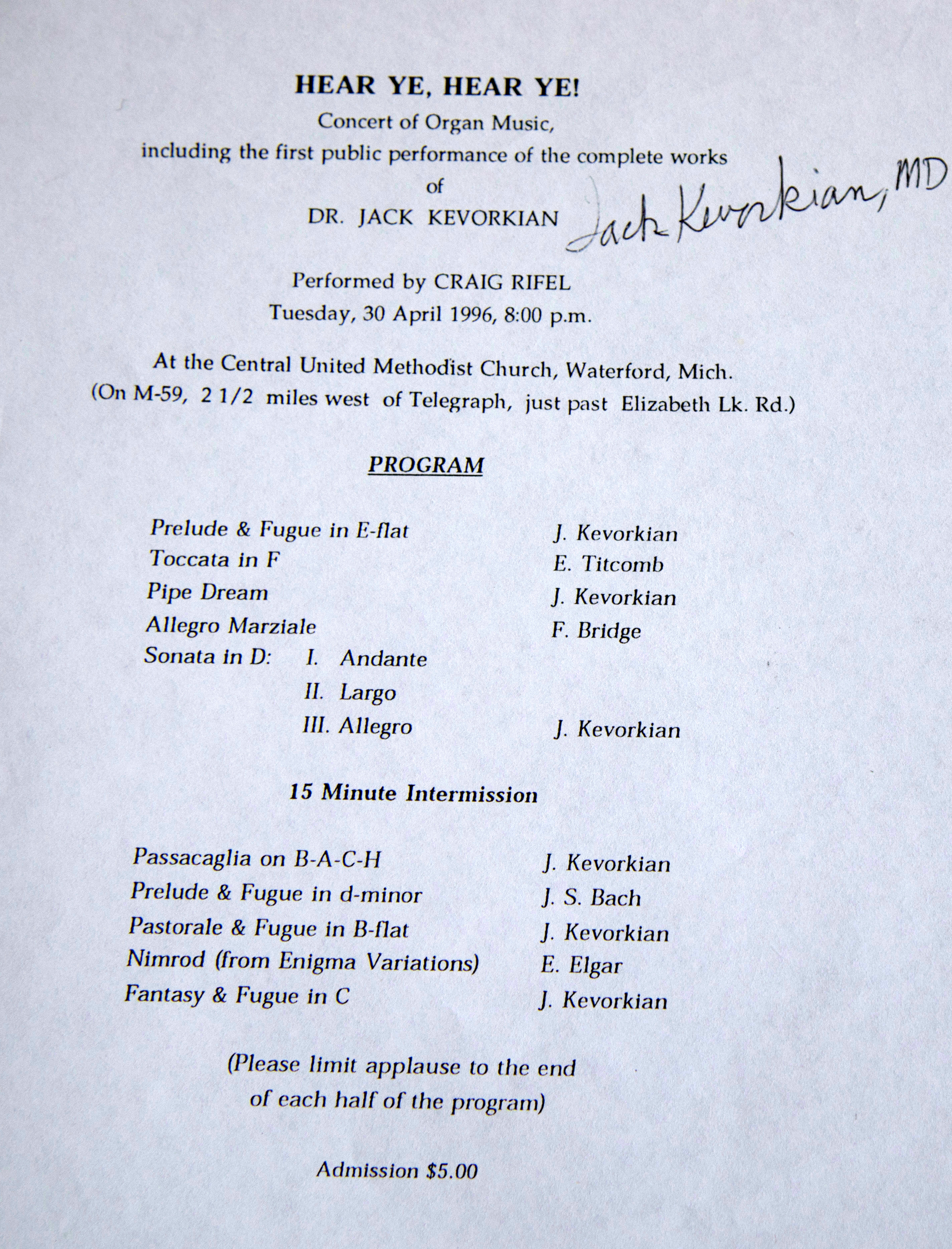
Concert program from Jack Kevorkian's 1996 concert

Kevorkian was a jazz musician and composer. The Kevorkian Suite: A Very Still Life was a 1997 limited-release CD of 5,000 copies from the 'Lucid Subjazz' label. It features Kevorkian on the flute and organ playing his own works with "The Morpheus Quintet". It was reviewed in Entertainment Weekly online as "weird" but "good-natured". As of 1997, 1,400 units had been sold. Kevorkian wrote all the songs but one; the album was reviewed in jazzreview.com as "very much grooviness" except for one tune, with "stuff in between that's worthy of multiple spins".

He was also an oil painter. His work tended toward the grotesque and surreal, and he had created pieces of symbolic art, such as one "of a child eating the flesh off a decomposing corpse". Of his known works, six were made available in the 1990s for print release. The Ariana Gallery in Royal Oak, Michigan, is the exclusive distributor of Kevorkian's artwork. The original oil prints are not for release. Sludge metal band Acid Bath used his painting "For He is Raised" as the cover art for their 1996 album Paegan Terrorism Tactics.

In 2011, his paintings became the center of a legal entanglement between his sole heir and the Armenian Library and Museum of America.

== Trials, conviction, and imprisonment ==
Kevorkian was tried four times for assisting suicides between May 1994 and June 1997. With the assistance of Fieger, Kevorkian was acquitted three times. The fourth trial ended in a mistrial. The trials helped Kevorkian gain public support for his cause. After Oakland County prosecutor Richard Thompson lost a primary election to a Republican challenger, Thompson attributed the loss in part to the declining public support for the prosecution of Kevorkian and its associated legal expenses.

In the November 22, 1998, broadcast of CBS News' 60 Minutes, Kevorkian allowed the airing of a videotape he made on September 17, 1998, which depicted the voluntary euthanasia of Thomas Youk, 52, who was in the final stages of Lou Gehrig's disease. After Youk provided his fully informed consent (a sometimes complex legal determination made in this case by editorial consensus) on September 17, 1998, Kevorkian himself administered Thomas Youk a lethal injection. This was highly significant, as all of his earlier clients had reportedly completed the process themselves. During the videotape, Kevorkian dared the authorities to try to convict him or stop him from carrying out mercy killings. Youk's family described the lethal injection as humane, not murder.

On November 25, 1998, Kevorkian was charged with first-degree murder and the delivery of a controlled substance (administering the lethal injection to Thomas Youk). Because Kevorkian's license to practice medicine had been revoked eight years previously, he was not legally allowed to possess the controlled substance.

On March 26, 1999, a jury began deliberations in the first-degree murder trial of Kevorkian. He had discharged his attorneys and proceeded through the trial representing himself, a decision he later regretted. The judge ordered a criminal defense attorney to remain available at trial as standby counsel for information and advice. Inexperienced in law but persisting in his efforts to represent himself, Kevorkian encountered great difficulty in presenting his evidence and arguments. He was not able to call any witnesses to the stand as the judge did not deem the testimony of any of his witnesses relevant.

After a two-day trial, the Michigan jury found Kevorkian guilty of second-degree homicide. Judge Jessica Cooper sentenced Kevorkian to serve 10–25 years in prison and told him:

This is a court of law and you said you invited yourself here to take a final stand. But this trial was not an opportunity for a referendum. The law prohibiting euthanasia was specifically reviewed and clarified by the Michigan Supreme Court several years ago in a decision involving your very own cases, sir. So the charge here should come as no surprise to you. You invited yourself to the wrong forum. Well, we are a nation of laws, and we are a nation that tolerates differences of opinion because we have a civilized and a nonviolent way of resolving our conflicts that weighs the law and adheres to the law. We have the means and the methods to protest the laws with which we disagree. You can criticize the law, you can write or lecture about the law, you can speak to the media or petition the voters. But you must always stay within the limits provided by the law. You may not break the law. You may not take the law into your own hands ...

Kevorkian was sent to Lakeland Correctional Facility in Coldwater, Michigan, to serve his sentence. After his conviction (and subsequent losses on appeal), Kevorkian was denied parole until 2007.

In an MSNBC interview aired on September 29, 2005, Kevorkian said that if he were granted parole, he would not resume directly helping people die and would restrict himself to campaigning to have the law changed. On December 22, 2005, Kevorkian was denied parole by a board on the count of 7–2 recommending not to give parole.

Reportedly terminally ill with Hepatitis C, which he contracted in the 1960s, Kevorkian was expected to die within a year in May 2006. After applying for a pardon, parole, or commutation by the parole board and Governor Jennifer Granholm, he was paroled for good behavior on June 1, 2007. He had spent eight years and two and a half months in prison.

Kevorkian was on parole for two years, under the conditions that he would not help anyone else die, or provide care for anyone older than 62 or disabled. Kevorkian said he would abstain from assisting any more terminal patients with death, and his role in the matter would strictly be to persuade states to change their laws on assisted suicide. He was also forbidden by the rules of his parole from commenting about assisted suicide procedure.

== Activities after his release from prison ==
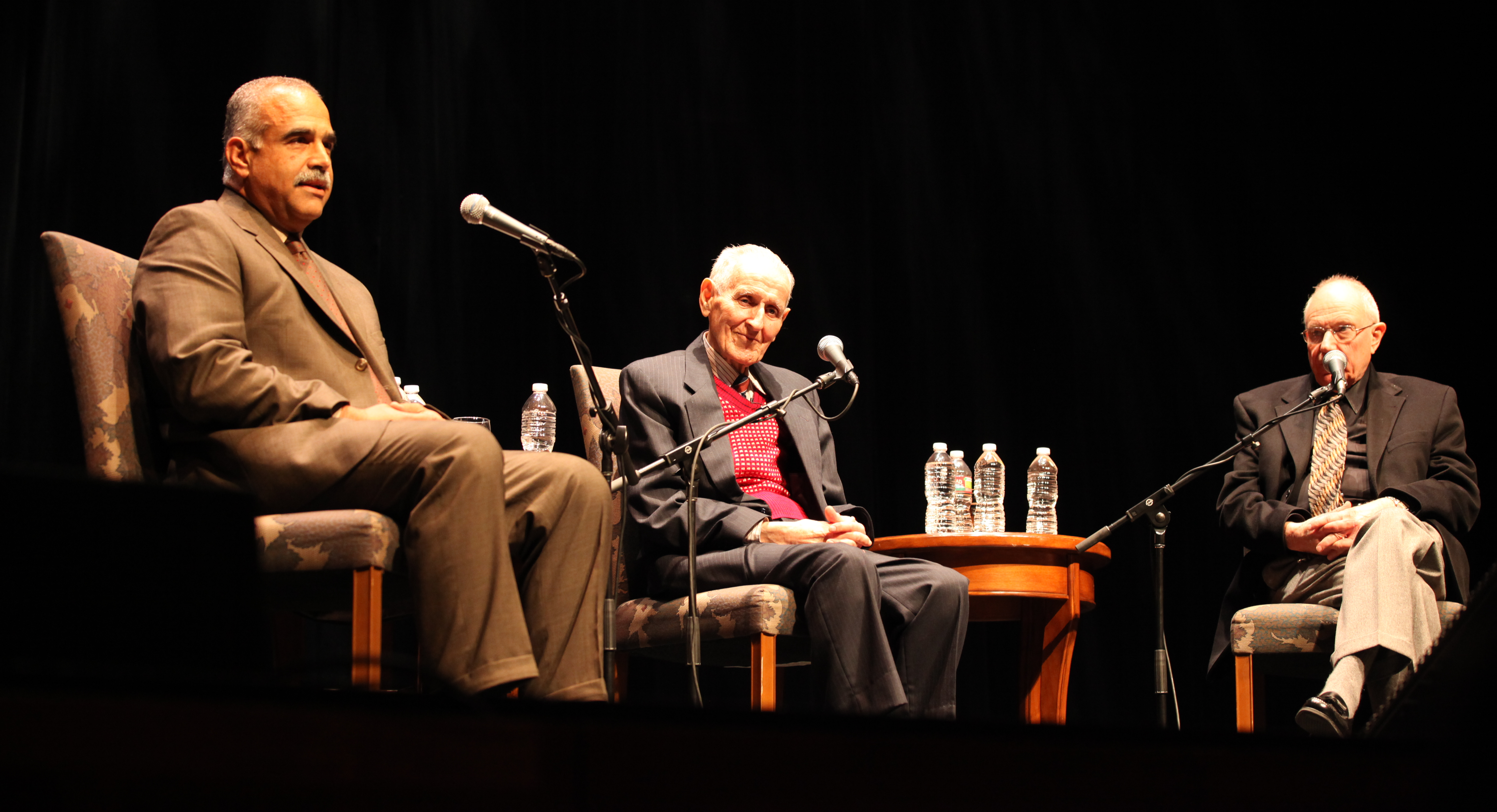
Kevorkian (center) answering questions at the University of California, Los Angeles with his lawyer Mayer Morganroth (right) and the former Armenian Minister of Foreign Affairs Raffi Hovannisian (left)

Kevorkian gave a number of lectures upon his release. He lectured at universities such as the University of Florida, Nova Southeastern University, and the University of California, Los Angeles. His lectures were not limited to the topic of euthanasia; he also discussed such topics as tyranny, the criminal justice system, politics, the Ninth Amendment to the United States Constitution and Armenian culture. He appeared on the Fox News Channel's Your World with Neil Cavuto on September 2, 2009, to discuss health care reform.

On April 15 and 16, 2010, Kevorkian appeared on CNN's Anderson Cooper 360°. Cooper asked, "You are saying doctors play God all the time?" Kevorkian said: "Of course. Any time you interfere with a natural process, you are playing God." Director Barry Levinson and actors Al Pacino, Susan Sarandon and John Goodman, who appeared in You Don't Know Jack, a film based on Kevorkian's life, were interviewed alongside Kevorkian. Kevorkian was again interviewed by Cavuto on Your World on April 19, 2010, regarding the movie and Kevorkian's world view. You Don't Know Jack premiered April 24, 2010, on HBO. The film premiered April 14 at the Ziegfeld Theater in New York City. Kevorkian walked the red carpet alongside Al Pacino, who portrayed him in the film. Pacino received Emmy and Golden Globe awards for his portrayal and personally thanked Kevorkian, who was in the audience, upon receiving both of these awards. Kevorkian stated that the film "brings tears to my eyes – and I lived through it".

=== 2008 congressional race ===
On March 12, 2008, Kevorkian announced plans to run for United States Congress to represent Michigan's 9th congressional district as an independent against eight-term congressman Joe Knollenberg (R-Bloomfield Hills), former Michigan Lottery commissioner and state senator Gary Peters (D-Bloomfield Township), Adam Goodman (L-Royal Oak) and Douglas Campbell (G-Ferndale). The race had already garnered national attention due to Democrats targeting the historically Republican district based in Oakland County, which Knollenberg barely won in 2006 against a little-known opponent. The district would suffer some of the worst brunt of the Great Recession due to declines in Detroit's automotive industry. Upon Kevorkian's entry into the race, one analyst viewed him as a potential spoiler to Peters' candidacy.

Ultimately, Kevorkian received 8,987 votes (2.6% of the vote) in the election, in which Peters defeated the incumbent Knollenberg by a nine-percent margin. Peters would eventually serve three terms in Congress before making a successful run for the United States Senate.

2008 General Election – Michigan's 9th Congressional District
Party	Candidate	Votes	%	±%
Democratic	Gary Peters	183,311	52.1	+5.9
Republican	Joe Knollenberg (i)	150,035	42.6	−9.0
Independent	Jack Kevorkian	8,987	2.6	N/A
Libertarian	Adam Goodman	4,893	1.4	−0.1
Green	Douglas Campbell	4,737	1.3	+0.4
Democratic gain from Republican		Swing		

== Illness and death ==
Kevorkian had struggled with kidney problems for years. He was diagnosed with liver cancer, which "may have been caused by hepatitis C," according to his longtime friend Neal Nicol. Kevorkian was hospitalized on May 18, 2011, with kidney problems and pneumonia. Kevorkian's condition rapidly worsened and he died from a thrombosis on June 3, 2011, at William Beaumont Hospital in Royal Oak, Michigan. According to his attorney, Mayer Morganroth, there were no artificial attempts to keep him alive and his death was painless. Kevorkian was buried in White Chapel Memorial Cemetery in Troy, Michigan.

== Legacy ==
Judge Thomas Jackson, who presided over Kevorkian's first murder trial in 1994, commented that he wanted to express sorrow at Kevorkian's death and that the 1994 case was brought under "a badly written law" aimed at Kevorkian, but he attempted to give him "the best trial possible". Geoffrey Fieger, Kevorkian's lawyer during the 1990s, gave a speech at a press conference in which he stated: "Dr. Jack Kevorkian didn't seek out history, but he made history." Fieger said that Kevorkian revolutionized the concept of suicide by working to help people end their own suffering, because he believed physicians are responsible for alleviating the suffering of patients, even if that meant allowing patients to die.

Kevorkian spoke at Presbyterian and Episcopal churches to gain support for euthanasia. John Finn, medical director of palliative care at the Catholic St. John's Hospital, said Kevorkian's methods were unorthodox and inappropriate. He added that many of Kevorkian's patients were isolated, lonely, and potentially depressed, and therefore in no state to mindfully choose whether to live or die. Derek Humphry, author of the suicide handbook Final Exit, said Kevorkian was "too obsessed, too fanatical, in his interest in death and suicide to offer direction for the nation".

In a 2015 Retro Report story about Kevorkian's legacy and the Right to Die movement, journalist Jack Lessenberry said Kevorkian "got a national debate going, which I think he then helped stifle by his own outrageous actions". Howard Markel, a medical historian at the University of Michigan, said that Kevorkian "was a major historical figure in modern medicine". The Catholic Church in Detroit said Kevorkian left behind a "deadly legacy" that denied scores of people their right to "dignified, natural" deaths. Philip Nitschke, founder and director of right-to-die organization Exit International, said that Kevorkian "moved the debate forward in ways the rest of us can only imagine. He started at a time when it was hardly talked about and got people thinking about the issue. He paid one hell of a price, and that is one of the hallmarks of true heroism."

The epitaph on Kevorkian's tombstone reads, "He sacrificed himself for everyone's rights."

In 2015, the 1968 Volkswagen Type 2 van in which Jack Kevorkian assisted some of his suicidal patients was bought by paranormal investigator Zak Bagans (from the documentary series Ghost Adventures) for display in his haunted museum in Las Vegas.

== Publications ==
=== Books ===
- Kevorkian, Jack (1959). The Story of Dissection. Philosophical Library. ISBN 978-1-258-07746-4.
- Kevorkian, Jack (1960). Medical Research and the Death Penalty: A Dialogue. Vantage Books. ISBN 978-0-9602030-1-7.
- Kevorkian, Jack (1966). Beyond Any Kind of God. Philosophical Library. ISBN 978-0-8022-0847-7.†
- Kevorkian, Jack (1978). Slimmericks and the Demi-Diet. Penumbra, Inc. ISBN 978-0-9602030-0-0.††
- Kevorkian, Jack (1991). Prescription: Medicide, the Goodness of Planned Death. Prometheus Books. ISBN 978-0-87975-872-1 – via Internet Archive.
- Kevorkian, Jack (2004). glimmerIQs. Penumbra, Inc. ISBN 978-0-9602030-7-9.
- Kevorkian, Jack (2005). Amendment IX: Our Cornucopia of Rights. Penumbra, Inc. ISBN 096020301X.
- Kevorkian, Jack (2010). When the People Bubble POPs. World Audience, Inc. ISBN 978-1-935444-91-6.

† = Later heavily revised and incorporated into glimmerIQs

†† = Later incorporated in abridged form into glimmerIQs

* = Revised and distributed in 2009 by World Audience, Inc.

=== Selected journal articles ===
- Kevorkian J (1985). "Opinions on capital punishment, executions and medical science". Medicine and Law. 4 (6): 515–533. PMID 4094526.
- Kevorkian J (1987). "Capital punishment and organ retrieval". Canadian Medical Association Journal. 136 (12): 1240. PMC 1492232. PMID 3580984.
- Kevorkian J (1988). "The last fearsome taboo: Medical aspects of planned death". Medicine and Law. 7 (1): 1–14. PMID 3277000.
- Kevorkian J (1989). "Marketing of human organs and tissues is justified and necessary". Medicine and Law. 7 (6): 557–565. PMID 2495395.

== See also ==
- God Bless You, Dr. Kevorkian, a collection of short fictional interviews written by Kurt Vonnegut
