= Connie Binsfeld =

American politician (1924–2014)

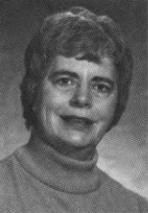
- Binsfeld in 1977

60th Lieutenant Governor of Michigan
- In office January 1, 1991 – January 1, 1999
- Governor: John Engler
- Preceded by: Martha Griffiths
- Succeeded by: Dick Posthumus

Member of the Michigan Senate from the 36th district
- In office January 1, 1983 – December 31, 1990
- Preceded by: John Engler
- Succeeded by: John Pridnia

Member of the Michigan House of Representatives from the 104th district
- In office January 1, 1975 – December 31, 1982
- Preceded by: Michael A. Dively
- Succeeded by: Thomas G. Power

Personal details
- Born: Connie Berube; April 18, 1924 Munising, Michigan, U.S.
- Died: January 12, 2014 (aged 89) Glen Lake, Michigan, U.S.
- Party: Republican
- Spouse: John Binsfeld
- Children: 5

Connie Berube Binsfeld (April 18, 1924 – January 12, 2014) was an American Republican politician from the U.S. State of Michigan. She served as the 60th lieutenant governor of Michigan. Starting as an advocate for the environment in planning for the Sleeping Bear Dunes National Lakeshore, she also was known for protecting interests of women and children. She was the first woman to hold leadership posts in Michigan's House, Senate and executive branch, where she served four terms in the House, two in the Senate, and two as Lieutenant Governor.

== Biography ==
Born Connie Berube in Munising, Michigan, in 1924, she attended local schools. After graduating from high school, Berube went to Siena Heights College. After she married in the 1940s, she and her husband settled near Detroit and had a family. She later taught high school history and politics.

Binsfeld became involved in local politics in Leelanau County, Michigan, where she and her family moved to Glen Lake from Detroit in 1968. She headed a citizens' council to participate in planning for the Sleeping Bear Dunes National Seashore. She served 10 years on the Great Lakes Commission.

Recognized for her speaking and leadership, Binsfeld was first elected to political office as county commissioner for Leelanau County, Michigan. In 1974, she was elected to the first of four successive terms in the Michigan House of Representatives. She would later serve two terms in the Michigan Senate. As a member of the Legislature, she was known for sponsoring some of the strongest legislation to address domestic violence, and was known as an advocate for women and children. She continued her interest in the environment. At the time of her death, Gov. Rick Snyder noted the importance of her sponsoring the Sand Dunes Protection Act and introducing the 1983 Quality of Life Bonding Bill for cleanup of areas.

In 1990, Binsfeld was selected to be the running mate of Republican gubernatorial candidate John Engler. She took office as the state's lieutenant governor in 1991 and served until early 1999. As lieutenant governor, she headed the Binsfeld Children's Commission. Its investigation of issues related to adoption and the child welfare system produced 197 proposed reforms, including for adoption and other laws. The state legislature passed 20 laws drafted by Binsfeld and her staff to make policy to implement these recommendations.

Binsfeld died at age 89 in Glen Lake, Michigan, on January 12, 2014, in hospice.

== Personal life ==
She was married to John Binsfeld. They had five children together: John, Greg, Susan, Paul and Mike.

== Legacy and honors ==
- 1977, named Michigan Mother of the Year
- 1990, Binsfeld received the Sister Ann Joachim Award from her alma mater, Siena Heights University.
- In 1998, she was named to the Michigan Women's Hall of Fame.
- She also received Honorary Doctorates of Humane Letters from University of Notre Dame, Northern Michigan University, Grand Valley State University, and other institutions of higher learning.

== See also ==
- List of female lieutenant governors in the United States

Party political offices
Preceded by Colleen House	Republican nominee for Lieutenant Governor of Michigan; 1990, 1994	Succeeded by Dick Posthumus
Political offices
Preceded by Martha Griffiths	Lieutenant Governor of Michigan; 1991–1999	Succeeded by Dick Posthumus
