= 2019 in Michigan =

- Decades: 1990s; 2000s; 2010s; 2020s
- See also: History of Michigan; Historical outline of Michigan; List of years in Michigan; 2019 in the United States

This article reviews 2019 in Michigan, including the state's office holders, performance of its sports teams and athletes, a chronology of the state's top news and sports stories, and a list of notable Michigan-related deaths.

The top stories in Michigan during 2019 included the Larry Nassar sex abuse scandal and the deaths of William Milliken, John Conyers, John Dingell, and Lee Iacocca.

== Office holders ==
=== State office holders ===
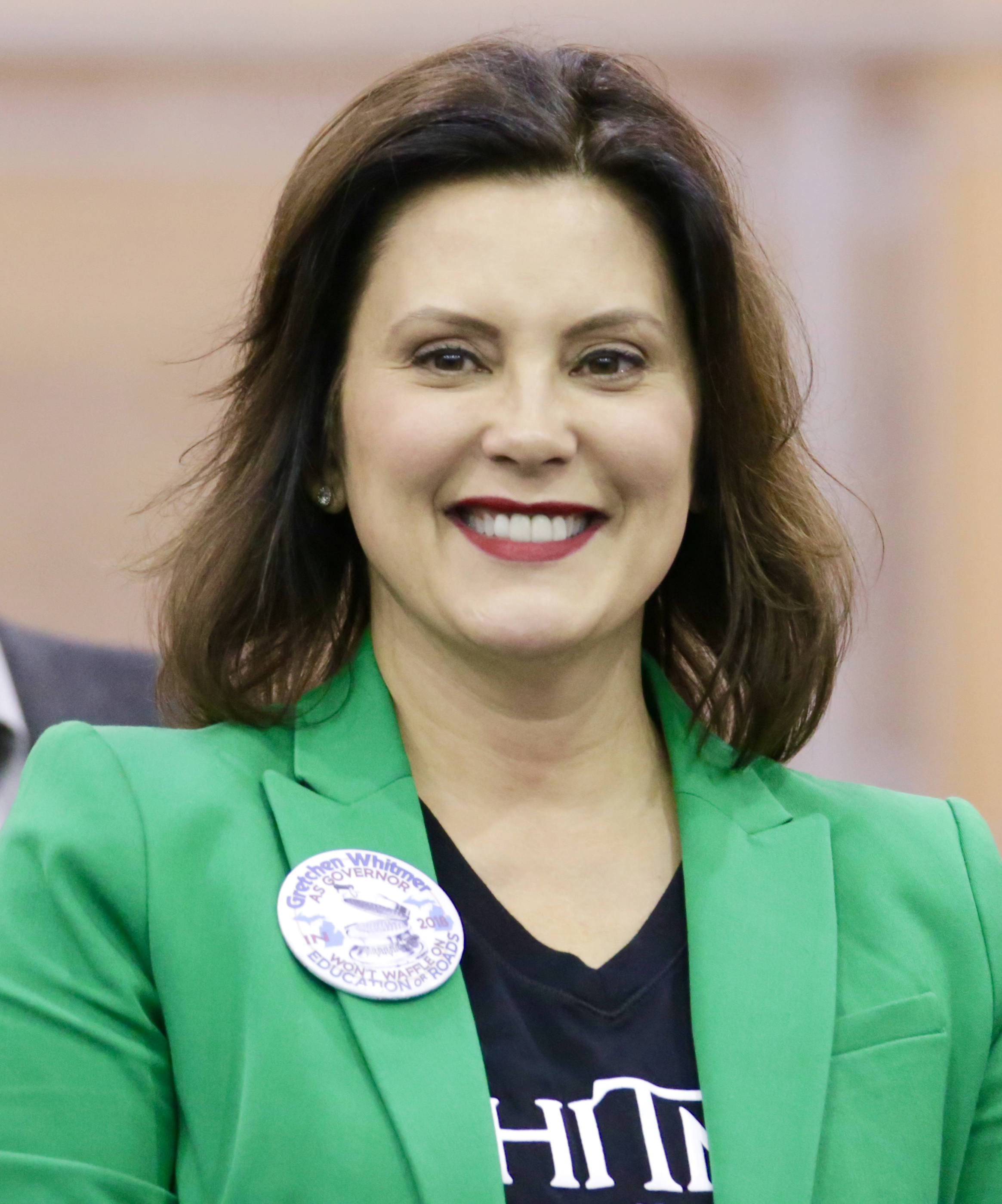
Gretchen Whitmer

- Governor of Michigan: Gretchen Whitmer (Democratic)
- Lieutenant Governor of Michigan: Garlin Gilchrist (Democratic)
- Michigan Attorney General: Dana Nessel (Democratic)
- Michigan Secretary of State: Jocelyn Benson (Democratic)
- Speaker of the Michigan House of Representatives: Tom Leonard (Republican) (until January 9), Lee Chatfield (Republican) (starting January 9)
- Majority Leader of the Michigan Senate: Mike Shirkey (Republican)
- Chief Justice, Michigan Supreme Court: Stephen Markman (until January 9), Bridget Mary McCormack (starting January 9)

=== Mayors of major cities ===
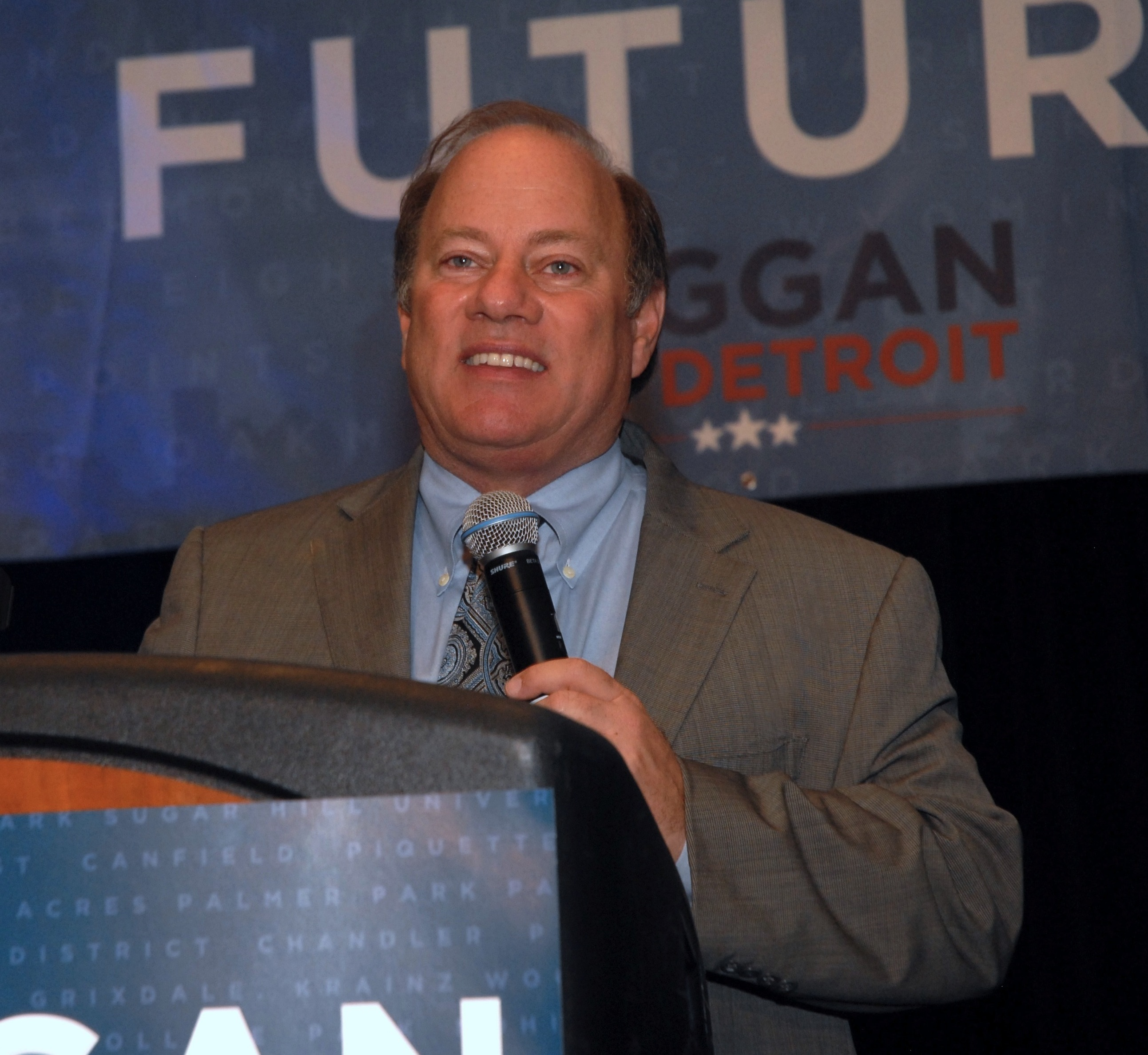
Mike Duggan

- Mayor of Detroit: Mike Duggan (Democrat)
- Mayor of Grand Rapids: Rosalynn Bliss
- Mayor of Warren, Michigan: James R. Fouts
- Mayor of Sterling Heights, Michigan: Michael C. Taylor
- Mayor of Ann Arbor: Christopher Taylor (Democrat)
- Mayor of Dearborn: John B. O'Reilly Jr.
- Mayor of Lansing: Andy Schor
- Mayor of Flint: Karen Weaver/Sheldon Neeley
- Mayor of Saginaw: Floyd Kloc

=== Federal office holders ===
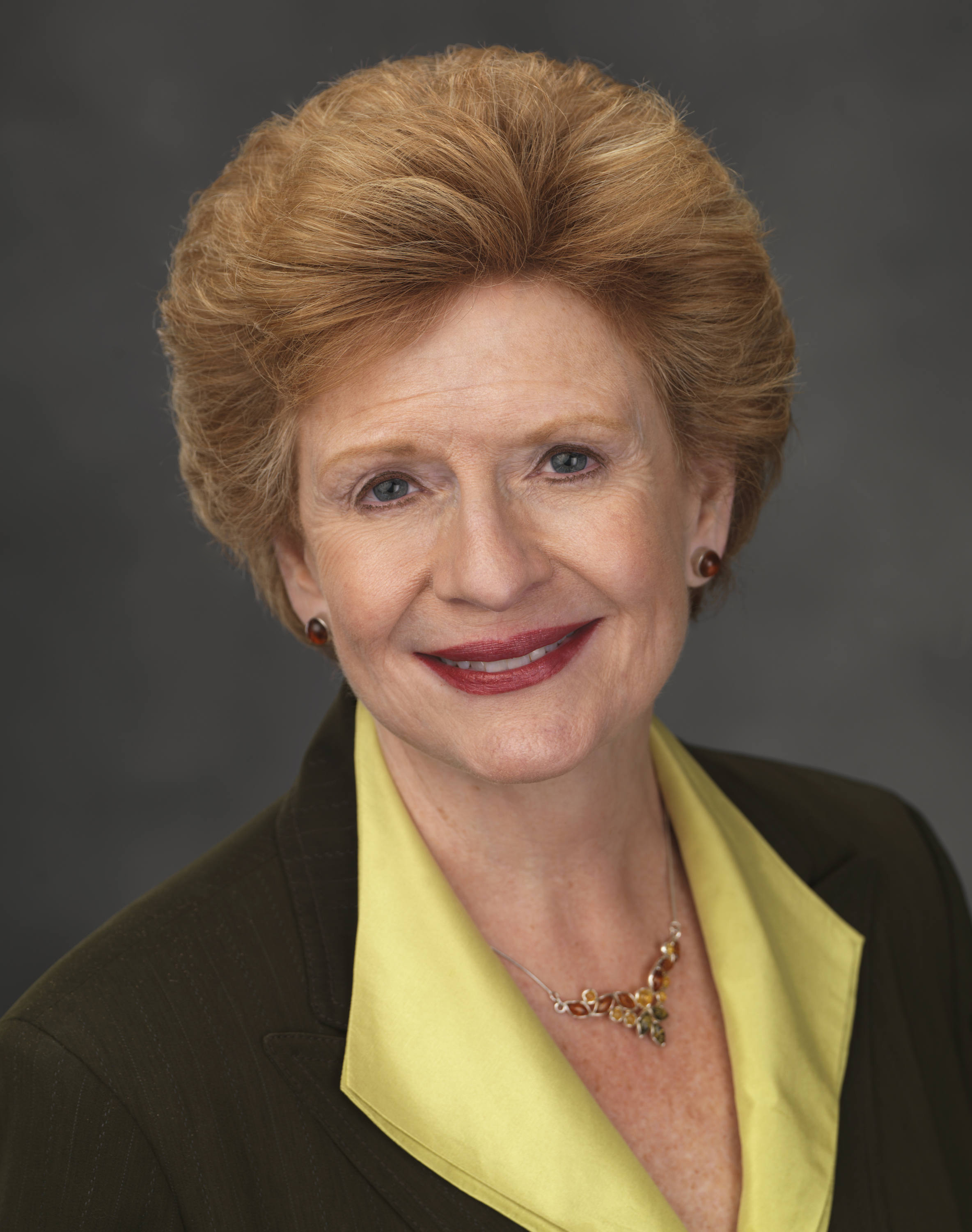
Debbie Stabenow

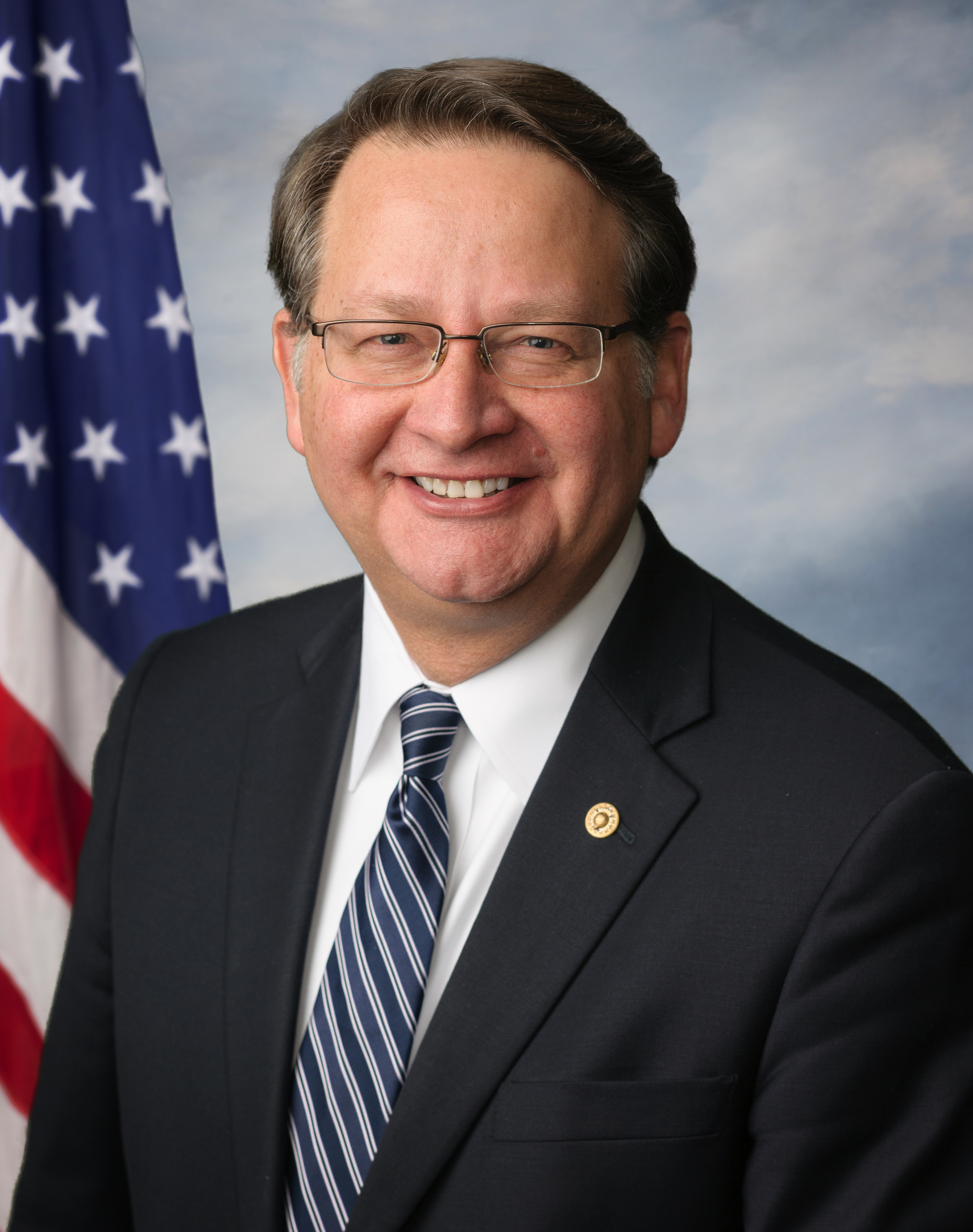
Gary Peters

- U.S. Senator from Michigan: Debbie Stabenow (Democrat)
- U.S. Senator from Michigan: Gary Peters (Democrat)
- House District 1: Jack Bergman (Republican)
- House District 2: Bill Huizenga (Republican)
- House District 3: Justin Amash (Republican)
- House District 4: John Moolenaar (Republican)
- House District 5: Dan Kildee (Democrat)
- House District 6: Fred Upton (Republican)
- House District 7: Tim Walberg (Republican)
- House District 8: Elissa Slotkin (Democrat)
- House District 9: Andy Levin (Democrat)
- House District 10: Paul Mitchell (Republican)
- House District 11: Haley Stevens (Democrat)
- House District 12: Debbie Dingell (Democrat)
- House District 13: Rashida Tlaib (Democrat)
- House District 14: Brenda Lawrence (Democrat)

== Population ==
In the 2010 United States Census, Michigan was recorded as having a population of 9,883,640 persons, ranking as the eighth most populous state in the country. By 2018, the state's population was estimated at 9,995,915, and the state had become the 10th most populous state.

The state's largest cities, having populations of at least 75,000 based on 2019 estimates, were as follows:

2019 rank	City	County	2010 pop. (est)	2019 pop.	Change 2010–19
1	Detroit	Wayne	713,777	670,031	−6.1% ▼
2	Grand Rapids	Kent	188,040	201,013	6.9% ▲
3	Warren	Macomb	134,056	133,943	−0.01% ▼
4	Sterling Heights	Macomb	129,699	132,438	2.1% ▲
5	Ann Arbor	Washtenaw	113,934	119,980	5.3% ▲
6	Lansing	Ingham	114,297	118,210	3.4% ▲
7	Flint	Genesee	102,434	95,538	−6.7% ▼
8	Dearborn	Wayne	98,153	93,932	−4.3% ▼
9	Livonia	Wayne	96,942	93,665	−3.4% ▼
10	Troy	Oakland	80,980	84,092	3.8% ▲
11	Westland	Wayne	84,094	81,511	−3.1% ▼
12	Farmington Hills	Oakland	79,740	80,612	1.1% ▲
13	Kalamazoo	Kalamazoo	74,262	76,200	2.6% ▲
14	Wyoming	Kent	72,125	75,667	4.9% ▲

== Sports ==
=== Baseball ===
- 2019 Detroit Tigers season – Under manager Ron Gardenhire, the Tigers compiled a 47–114 record, the worst record in Major League Baseball. The team's statistical leaders included Harold Castro with a .291 batting average, Brandon Dixon with 15 home runs, Miguel Cabrera with 59 RBIs, Buck Farmer with a 3.72 earned run average, and Matthew Boyd with 238 strikeouts and nine wins.

=== American football ===
- 2019 Detroit Lions season - Under head coach Matt Patricia, the team compiled a 2–3–1 record through the first six games.
- 2019 Michigan Wolverines football team - Under head coach Jim Harbaugh the team compiled a 5–2 record through the first seven games.
- 2019 Michigan State Spartans football team - Under head coach Mark Dantonio the team compiled a 4–3 record through the first seven games.
- 2019 Central Michigan Chippewas football team - Under head coach Jim McElwain the team compiled a 5–3 record through the first eight games.
- 2019 Eastern Michigan Eagles football team - Under head coach Chris Creighton the team compiled a 4–3 record through the first seven games.
- 2019 Western Michigan Broncos football team - Under head coach Tim Lester the team compiled a 4–4 record through the first eight games.

=== Basketball ===
- 2018–19 Detroit Pistons season – Under head coach Dwane Casey, the Pistons compiled a 41–41 record. The team's statistical leaders included Blake Griffin with 402 assists and 1,841 points and Andre Drummond with 1,232 rebounds.
- 2018–19 Michigan Wolverines men's basketball team – Under head coach John Beilein, the Wolverines compiled a 30–7 and were ranked No. 8 in the final AP poll.
- 2018–19 Michigan State Spartans men's basketball team – Under head coach Tom Izzo, the Spartans compiled a 32–7 record, were ranked No. 5 in the AP poll, and advanced to the Final Four.
- 2018–19 Michigan Wolverines women's basketball team – Under head coach Kim Barnes Arico, the Wolverines compiled a 22–12 record.
- 2018–19 Michigan State Spartans women's basketball team – Under head coach Suzy Merchant, the Spartans compiled a 21–12 record.

=== Ice hockey ===
- 2018–19 Detroit Red Wings season – Under head coach Jeff Blashill, the Wings compiled a 32–40–10 record.
- 2018–19 Michigan Wolverines men's ice hockey season – Under head coach Mel Pearson, the Wolverines compiled a 13–16–7 record.

== Music and culture ==
- January 19 - Greta Van Fleet, a rock band from Frankenmuth, Michigan, featuring three Kiszka brothers, appeared on Saturday Night Live, performing "Black Smoke Rising" and "You're the One".
- February 10 - From the Fires by Greta Van Fleet won the 2019 Grammy Award for Best Rock Album.
- February 23 - Eminem celebrated the 20th anniversary of the release of "The Slim Shady LP". A 20th anniversary digital edition was released with bonus tracks, rarities, a capellas, freestyles, and instrumentals.
- March 10 - "Aretha! A Grammy Celebration for the Queen of Soul", a tribute concert for Aretha Franklin taped on January 13 in Los Angeles, aired on CBS.
- April 21 - "Motown 60: A Grammy Celebration", a tribune concert celebrating the 60th anniversary of the founding of Motown Records held in February, aired on CBS.
- May 3 - Jack White received an honorary degree from Wayne State University as part of the school's commencement ceremony at Detroit's Fox Theatre.
- June 5 - The address of the DTE Energy Music Theatre in Clarkston, Michigan, was changed from 7774 Sashabaw to 33 Bob Seger Drive, as a tribute to Bob Seger's 33 shows at the theatre. As part of his farewell tour, the 74-year-old Seger performed six shows at DTE as part of his Roll Me Away farewell tour.
- June 7 - The album Scriptures by Detroit rapper Tee Grizzley was released and reached No. 9 on the U.S. rap chart.
- June 14 - Madonna's 14th studio album "Madame X" was released. It reached No. 1 on the Billboard album chart.
- August 23 - "Hitsville: The Making of Motown", a documentary produced by Berry Gordy, premiered in Royal Oak before airing the following night on Showtime.
- September 6 - Kid Rock started a four-show stand at DTE Energy Music Theatre.
- October 18 - "Stacked", the debut album from Detroit rapper Kash Doll, was released. She also performed on singles in 2019 with Lil Wayne, Big Sean, and Iggy Azalea, and signed as an opening performer for Meek Mill's 2019 The Motivation Tour.

== Chronology of events ==
=== January ===
- January 1 - Democrat Gretchen Whitmer was sworn in as the 49th Governor of Michigan on the Capitol grounds in Lansing
- January 3 - Democrat Rashida Tlaib, the first Palestinian-American elected to Congress, and three other new members of the House from Michigan (Andy Levin, Elissa Slotkin, and Haley Stevens) were sworn in. Tlaib drew national attention with her public call to "impeach the mother****er" in reference to President Trump.
- January 6 - An Arab-American family of five from Northville, Michigan, was killed by a wrong-way driver on I-75
- January 7 - Uber driver Jason Dalton pled guilty to six counts of first-degree murder in the 2016 Kalamazoo shootings.
- January 9 - Fiat Chrysler agreed to pay $650 million to settle claims that it cheated on emissions tests.
- January 12 - The 60th anniversary of Motown Records was celebrated in Detroit.
- January 15 - Ford and Volkswagen announce a new business alliance.
- January 16 - Hours before the board was scheduled to meet to consider firing him, John Engler resigned as interim president of Michigan State University. He was criticized for his handling of the university's response to the Larry Nassar sex abuse scandal.
- January 30 - A U.S. Department of Education report on the Nassar sex abuse scandal was highly critical of Michigan State University's handling of reports of sexual abuse.

=== February ===
- February 21 - Michigan Attorney General Dana Nessel announced an investigation into George Perles' resignation from the Michigan State University Board of Trustees and the decision to waive a debt owed by Perles to the university.
- February 26 - Fiat Chrysler announced plans to convert Detroit's Mack Avenue engine factory into a new assembly plant for its Jeep division, as part of a $4.5 billion investment in southeastern Michigan. The plant was touted as the city's first new auto assembly plant in a generation.

=== March ===
- March 5 - Gov. Gretchen Whitmer proposed a hike in fuel taxes to "fix the damn roads".
- March 6 - The State reported $42 million in marijana sales in the first four months since legalization, exceeding expectations.
- March 11 - Cassius Winston selected as Big Ten player of the year.
- March 18 - Former UAW vice president Norwood Jewell charged in FAC/UAW training center scandal.
- March 28 - Gov. Whitmer ordered a halt on a planned oil pipeline under the Straits of Mackinac.
- March 31 - The 2018–19 Michigan State Spartans men's basketball team defeated No. 1 seed Duke, 68–67, in the Elite Eight round of the 2019 NCAA Division I men's basketball tournament. The Spartans advanced to the Final Four but lost to Texas Tech in the semifinals on April 6.

=== April ===
- April 3 - Kelly Stafford, the 29-year-old wife of Lions quarterback Matthew Stafford, diclosed that she would undergo surgery for a recently diagnosed brain tumor.
- April 10 - Premiere of "CREEM: America's Only Rock 'n' Roll Magazine" at The Fillmore Detroit.
- April 19 - Steve Yzerman returned to the Detroit Red Wings as the club's general manager.
- April 24 - Ford announced $500 million investment in Rivian.

=== May ===
- May 28 - Samuel L. Stanley appointed as the new president of Michigan State University, the first permanent president since the resignation of Lou Anna Simon amid the Larry Nassar sex abuse scandal.

=== June ===
- June 12 - Former Michigan State dean William Strampel found guilty of misconduct in office and willful neglect of duty in the Larry Nassar sex abuse scandal.
- June 12 - Detroit Marygrove College announced it would permanently close at the end of 2019.
- June - Demolition of Joe Louis Arena

=== August ===
- August 15 - Under pressure from President Trump, Israel Prime Minister Benjamin Netanyahu banned Michigan Congresswoman Rashida Tlaib from visiting Israel.

=== September ===
- September 2 - Gov. Gretchen Whitmer led 20,000 to 30,000 persons in the 62nd annual Labor Day Mackinac Bridge Walk.
- September 5 - The U.S. Department of Education imposed a record $4.5 million fine against Michigan State University for its mishandling of the Larry Nassar sexual abuse case.
- September 15 - The UAW declared a nationwide strike against General Motors, aka the 2019 General Motors strike. It was first nationwide strike by the UAW since 2007. Two days later, GM stopped paying health insurance premiums for striking workers.
- A 34-year-old Detroit man, Deangelo Martin, was arrested and charged with killing four women on Detroit's east side.

=== October ===
- October 21 - The U.S. Supreme Court reversed a Sixth Circuit decision challenging Republican-drawn electoral maps as being based on partisan gerrymandering.

=== December ===
- December 18 - On the day President Trump was impeached by the House of Representatives, he appeared at a rally in Battle Creek. Trump was criticized for a statement made at the rally suggesting that recently deceased Michigan Congressman John Dingell was in hell.

== Deaths ==
- January 6 – Robert L. Kahn, expert on organizational theory and former head of University of Michigan Survey Research Center, at age 100 in Burlington, Vermont
- February 7 – John Dingell, U.S. Congressman (1955–2015), at age 92 in Dearborn, Michigan
- February 20 – William Broomfield, U.S. Congressman (1957–1993), at age 96 in Kensington, Maryland
- March 4 – Ted Lindsay, NHL player (1944–65) and Red Wings (1944–57), inducted Hockey Hall of Fame, at age 93 in Oakland, Michigan
- April 2 – Don Williamson, Mayor of Flint (2003–09), at age 85
- April 28 – Damon Keith, U.S. Court of Appeals judge (1977–2019), at age 96 in Detroit
- April 31 - Russ Gibb, rock concert promoter, in Garden City
- May 2 – Red Kelly, NHL player (1947–67) and Red Wings (1947–60), inducted into Hockey Hall of Fame, at age 91 in Toronto
- May 29 – Loren E. Monroe, first African American Michigan State Treasurer, at age 87
- July 2 – Lee Iacocca, automotive executive with Ford (1946–78) and Chrysler (1978–92), at age 94 in Los Angeles
- July 3 – Arte Johnson, comic actor and Michigan native, at age 90 in Los Angeles
- July 6 – Gus Stager, University of Michigan swimmer (1947–48) and swimming coach (1955–82), 5x team national champion (1948, 1957–59, 1961), at age 96
- July 20 – R. James Harvey, U.S. Congressman and (1961–1974), U.S. District Court judge (1973–2019), at age 97 in Naples, Florida
- August 3 – L. Brooks Patterson, Oakland County prosecutor (1976–1992) and executive (1993–2019), at age 80 in Independence Township, Michigan
- September 3 - Detroit Lions superfan Donnie Stefanski, known as "Yooperman", at age 61 in Goetzville, Michigan
- September 21 – Napoleon Chagnon, anthropologist and expert on Amazon tribes, at age 81 in Traverse City, Michigan
- October 18 – William Milliken, Governor of Michigan (1969–1983), at age 97 in Traverse City, Michigan
- October 27 - John Conyers, the longest-serving black Congressman, at age 90 in Detroit
- October 30 - Bob Traxler, U.S. Congressman from Michigan's 8th District (1974–1993), at age 88 in Bay City
- November 11 - Charles Rogers, All-American wide receiver for Michigan State who also played for the Detroit Lions, at age 38 in Florida
- November 24 - Hank Bullough, American football player for Michigan State in the 1950s, at age 85
- December 7 - Bump Elliott, Michigan football player (1946–47) and head coach (1959–68), at age 94 in Iowa
- December 24 - Allee Willis, songwriter and Detroit native who was inducted into the Songwriters Hall of Fame, at age 72 in Los Angeles

=== Gallery of 2019 deaths ===
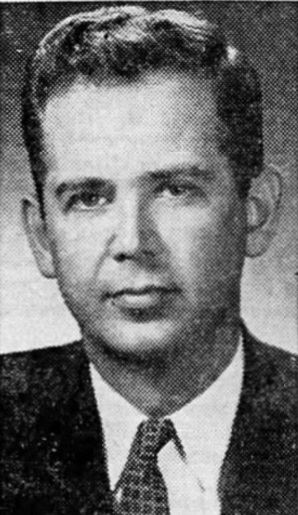
William Milliken

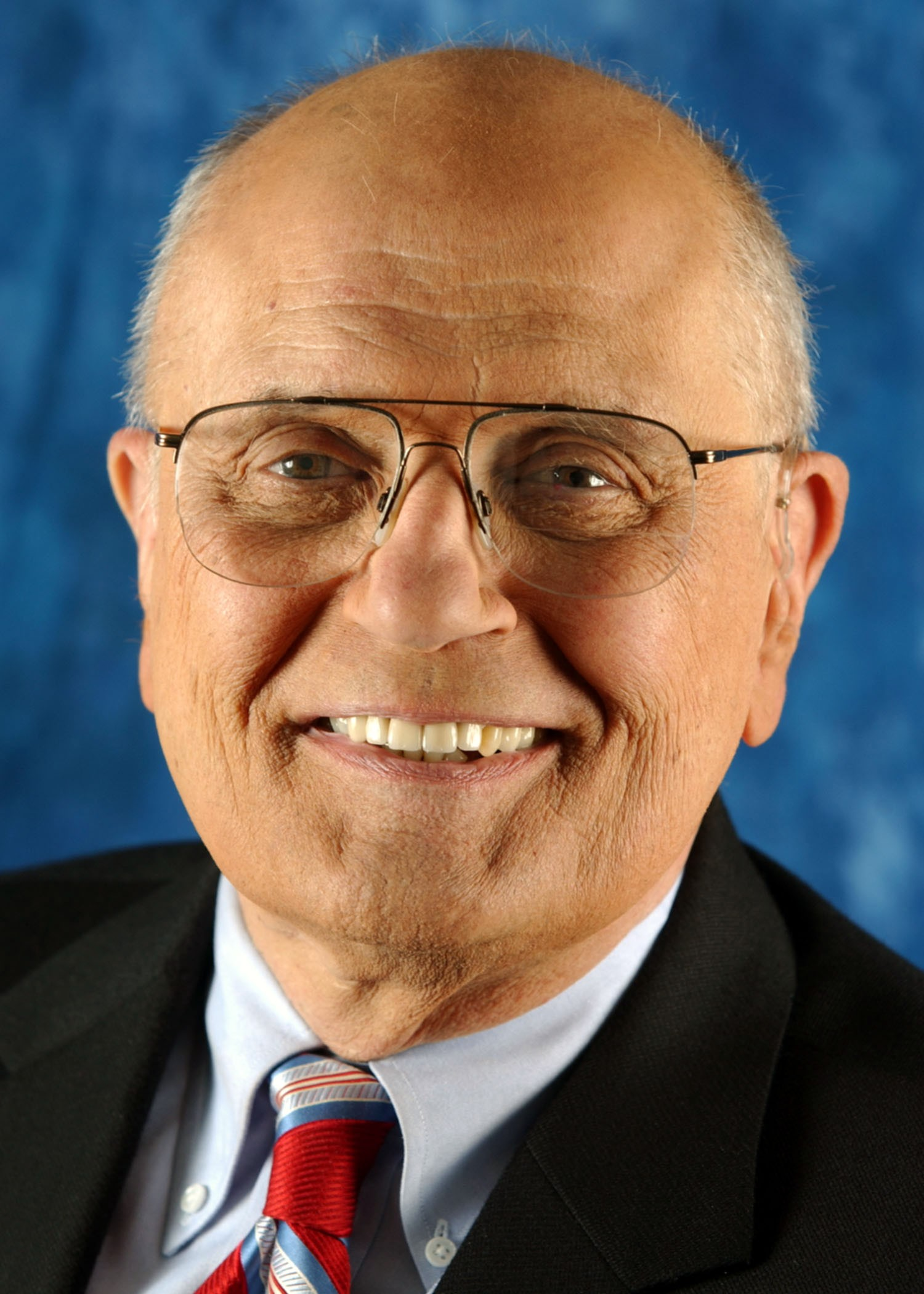
John Dingell

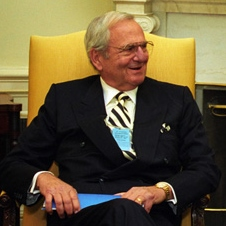
Lee Iacocca

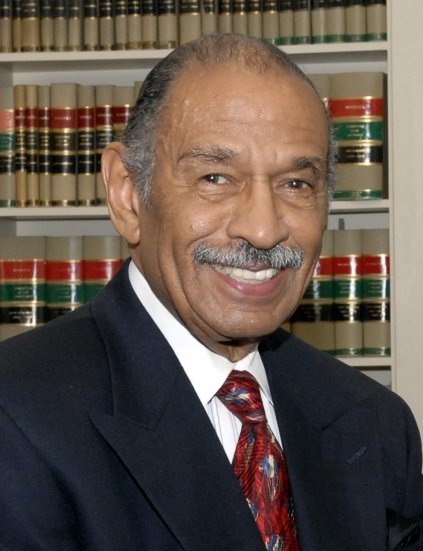
John Conyers

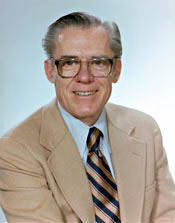
William Broomfield

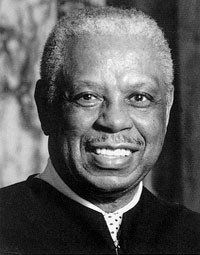
Damon Keith

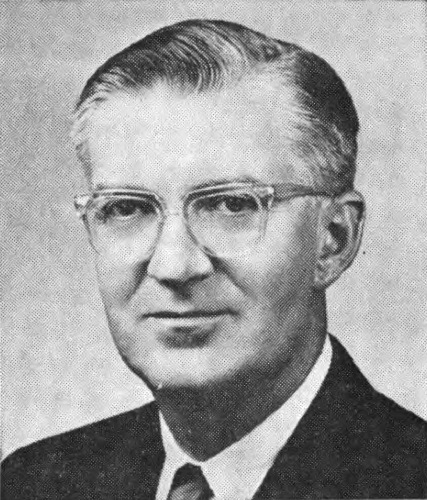
R. James Harvey

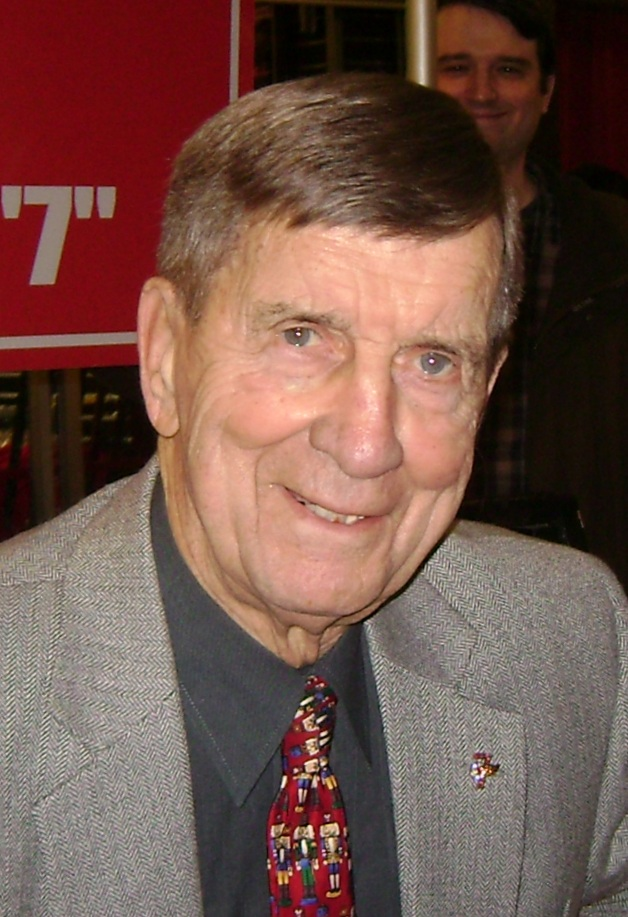
Ted Lindsay

Gus Stager

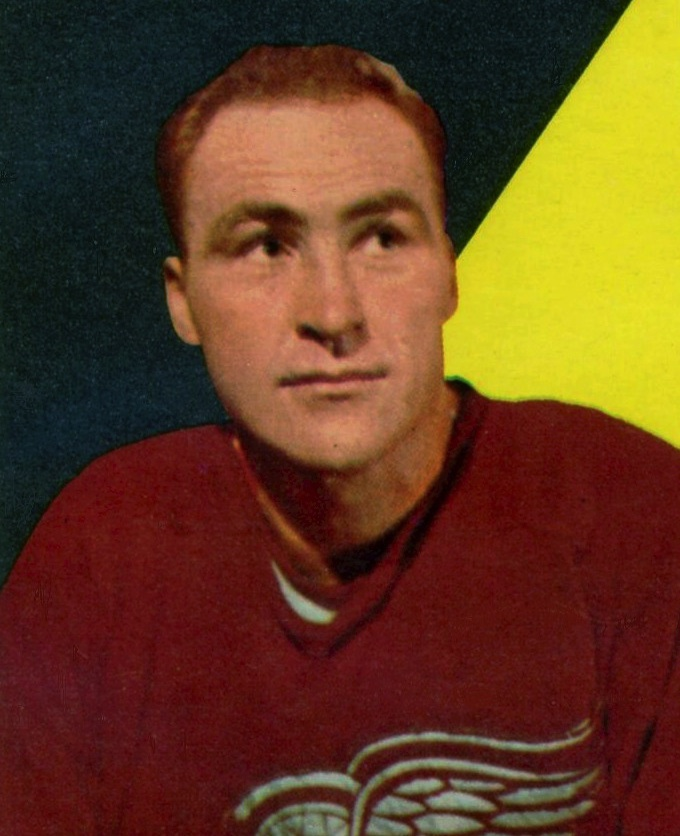
Red Kelly

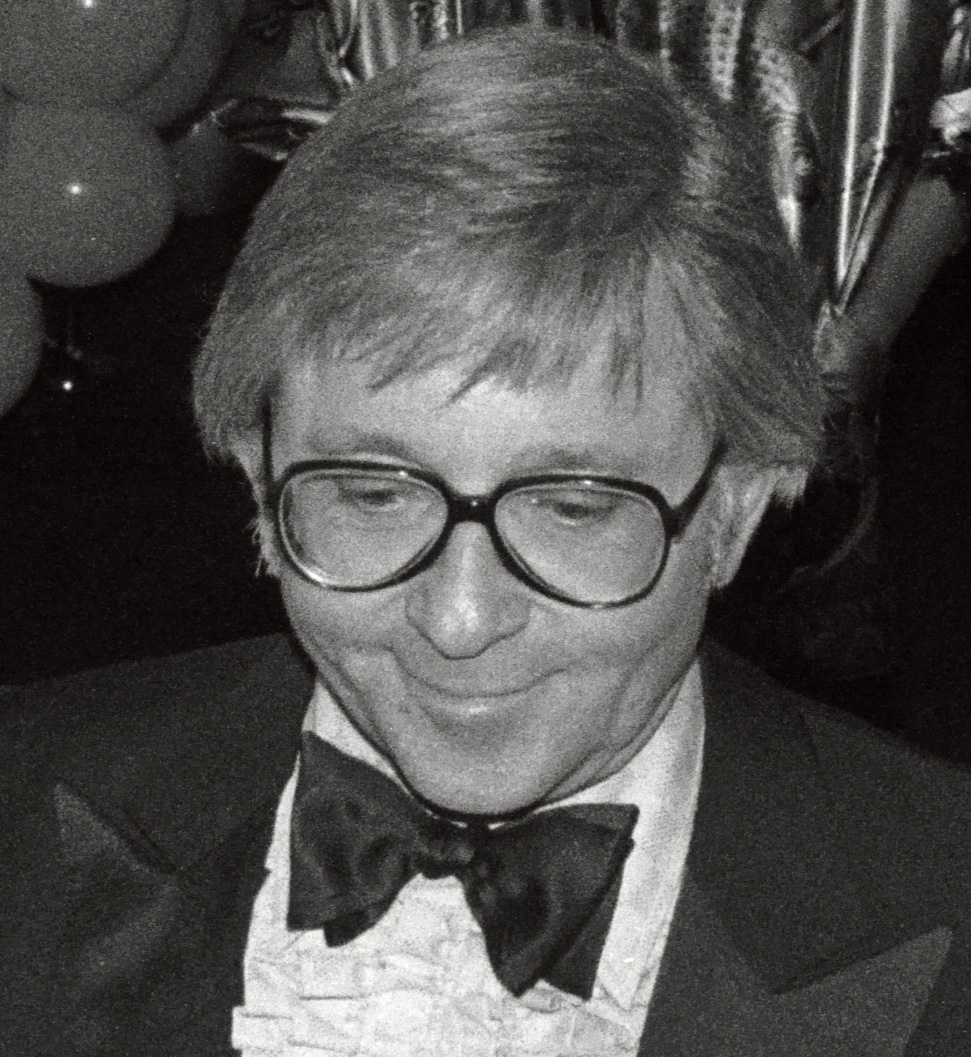
Arte Johnson
