= 2018 in Michigan =

- Decades: 1990s; 2000s; 2010s; 2020s
- See also: History of Michigan; Historical outline of Michigan; List of years in Michigan; 2018 in the United States

Events from the year 2018 in Michigan.

== Office holders ==
=== State office holders ===
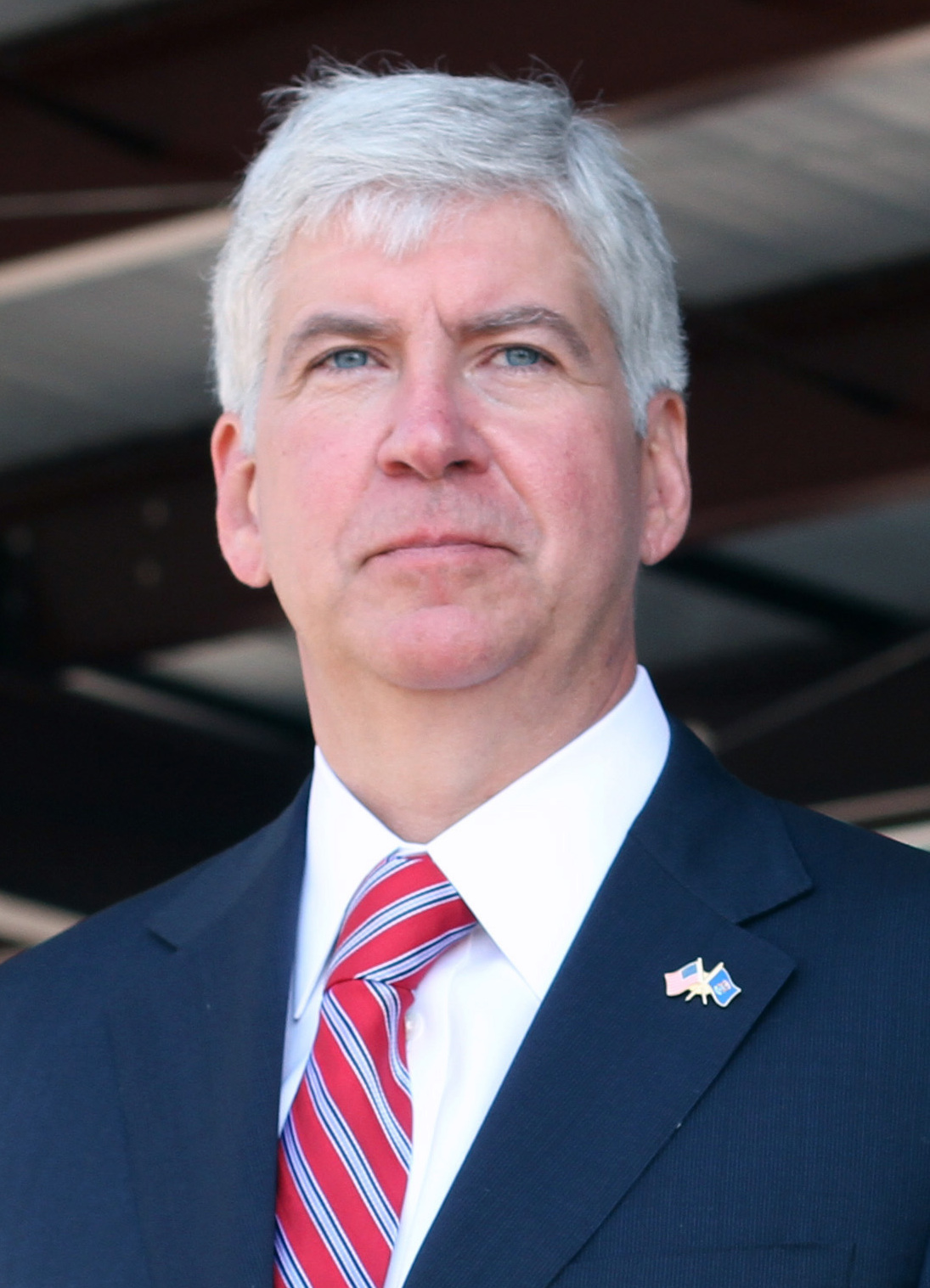
Rick Snyder

- Governor of Michigan: Rick Snyder (Republican)
- Lieutenant Governor of Michigan: Brian Calley (Republican)
- Michigan Attorney General: Bill Schuette (Republican)
- Michigan Secretary of State: Ruth Johnson (Republican)
- Speaker of the Michigan House of Representatives: Tom Leonard (Republican)
- Majority Leader of the Michigan Senate: Arlan Meekhof (Republican)
- Chief Justice, Michigan Supreme Court: Stephen Markman

=== Mayors of major cities ===
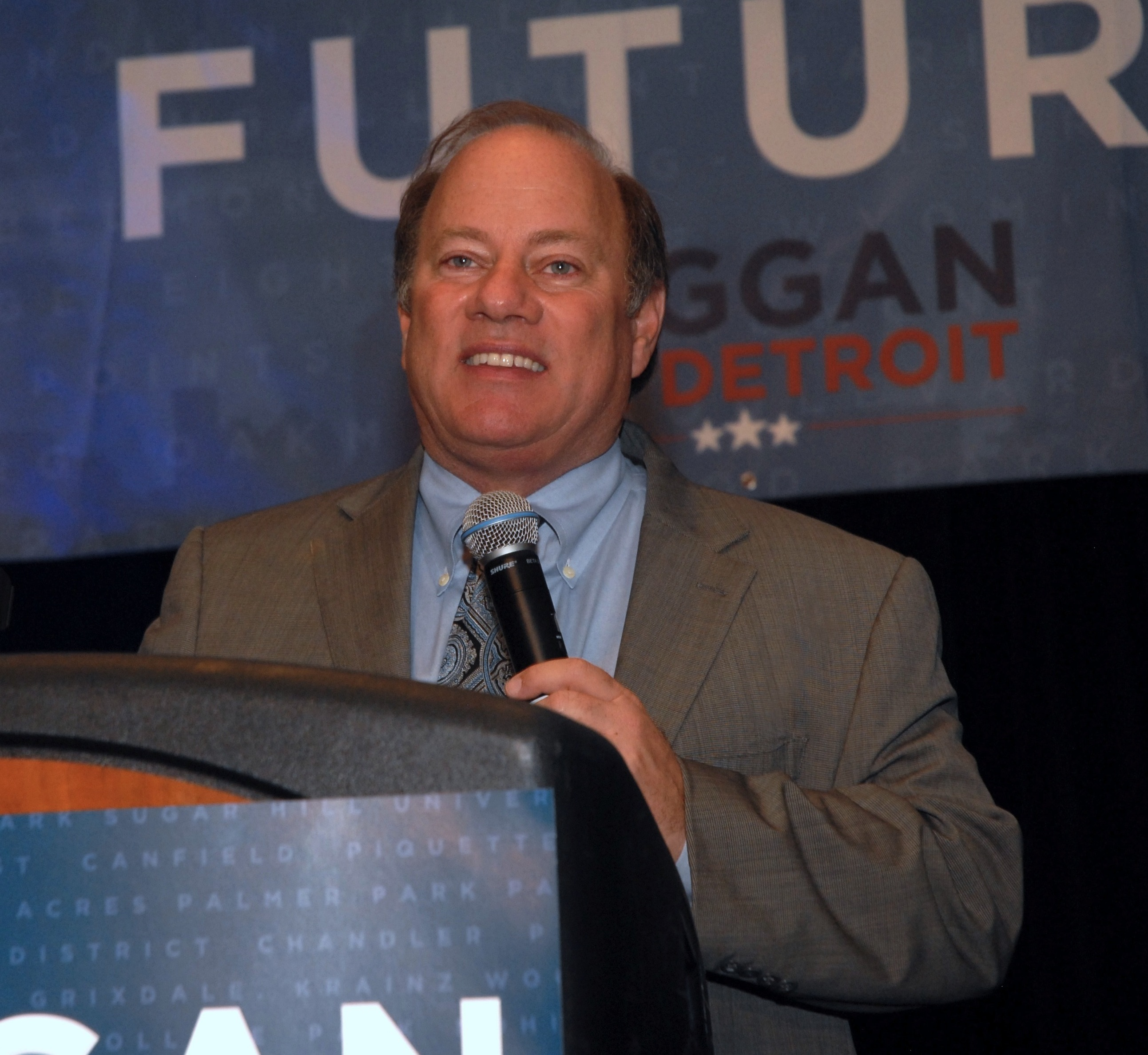
Mike Duggan

- Mayor of Detroit: Mike Duggan (Democrat)
- Mayor of Grand Rapids: Rosalynn Bliss
- Mayor of Warren, Michigan: James R. Fouts
- Mayor of Sterling Heights, Michigan: Michael C. Taylor
- Mayor of Ann Arbor: Christopher Taylor (Democrat)
- Mayor of Dearborn: John B. O'Reilly Jr.
- Mayor of Lansing: Andy Schor
- Mayor of Flint: Karen Weaver
- Mayor of Saginaw: Floyd Kloc

=== Federal office holders ===
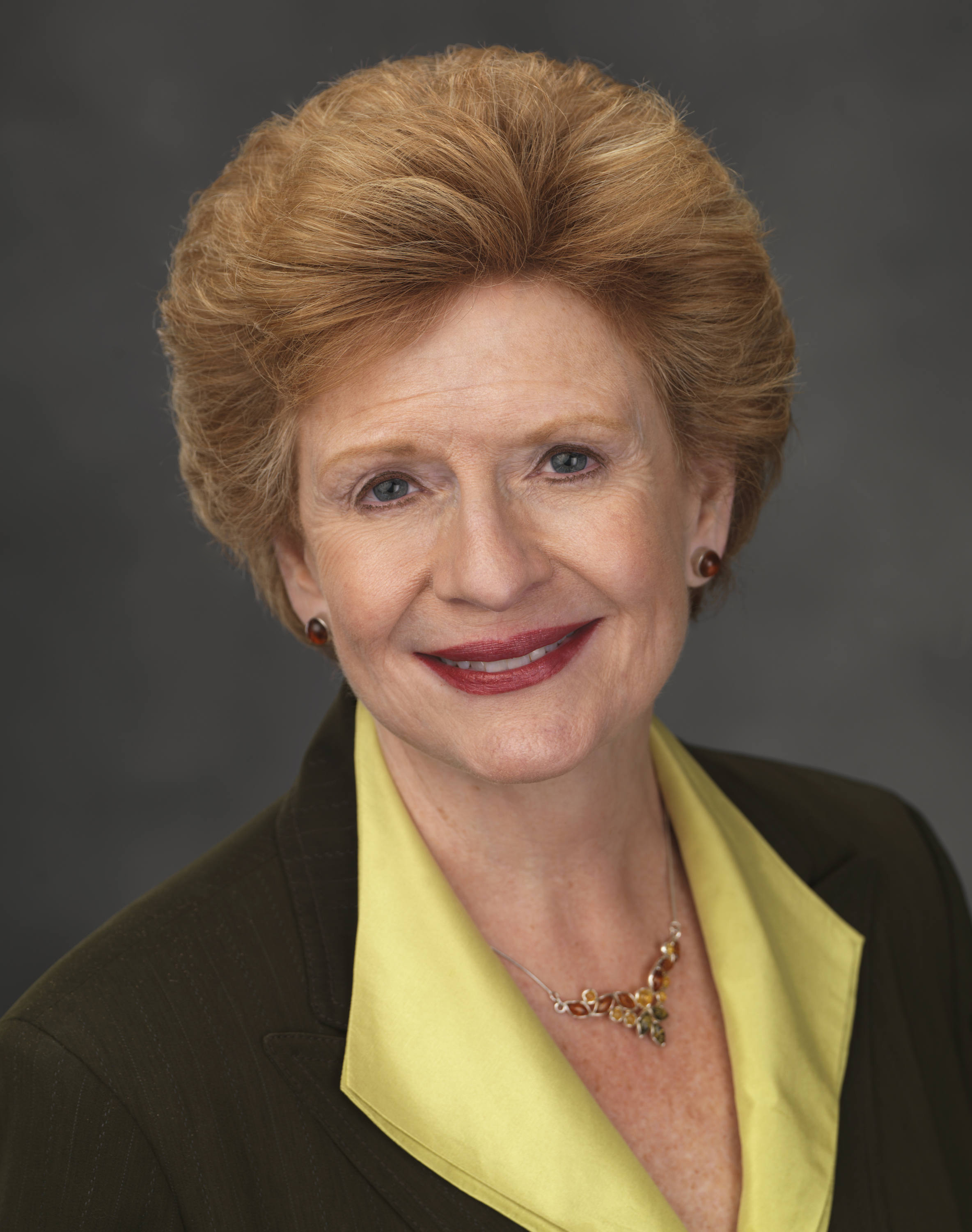
Debbie Stabenow

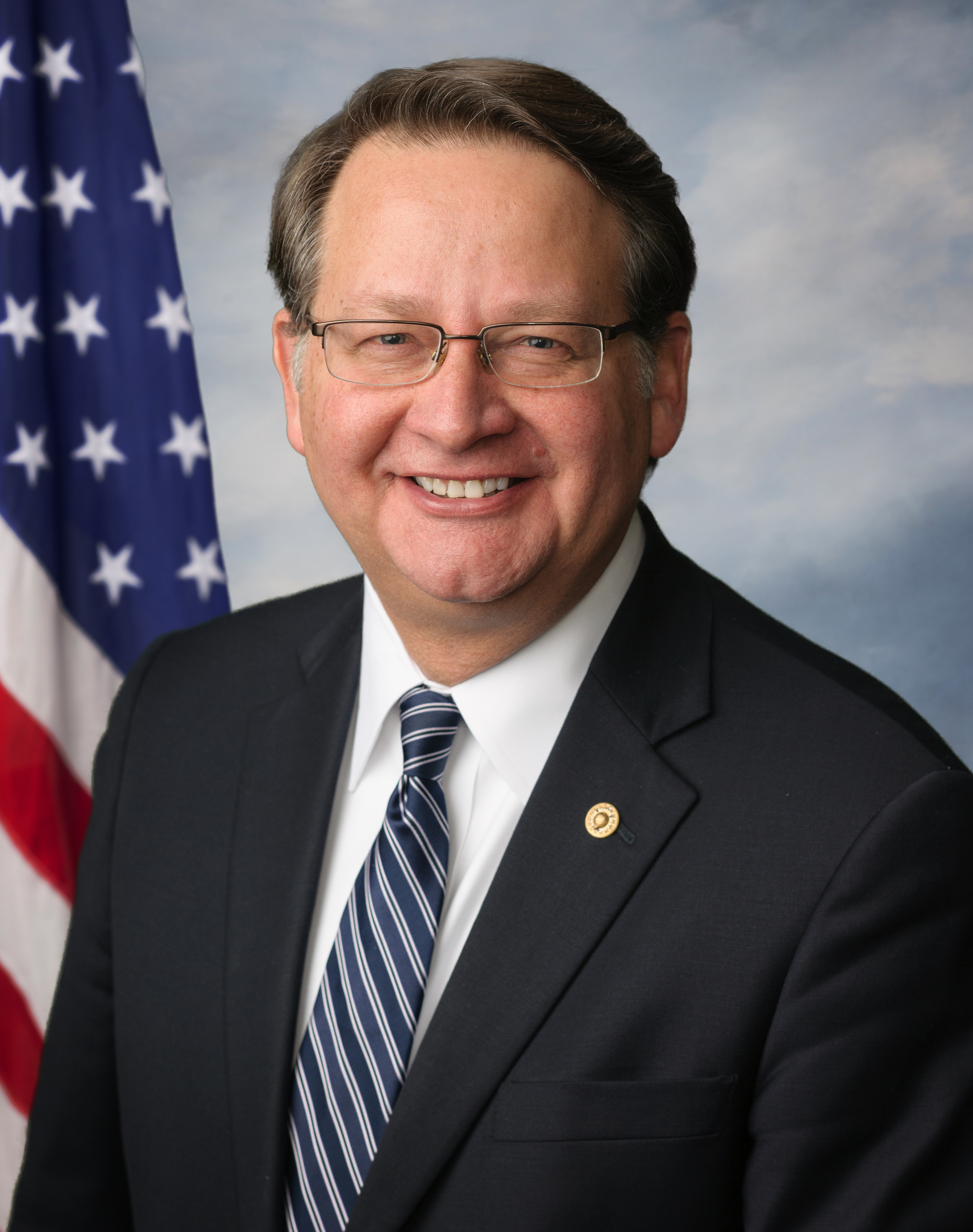
Gary Peters

- U.S. Senator from Michigan: Debbie Stabenow (Democrat)
- U.S. Senator from Michigan: Gary Peters (Democrat)
- House District 1: Jack Bergman (Republican)
- House District 2: Bill Huizenga (Republican)
- House District 3: Justin Amash (Republican)
- House District 4: John Moolenaar (Republican)
- House District 5: Dan Kildee (Democrat)
- House District 6: Fred Upton (Republican)
- House District 7: Tim Walberg (Republican)
- House District 8: Mike Bishop (Republican)
- House District 9: Sander Levin (Democrat)
- House District 10: Paul Mitchell (Republican)
- House District 11: David Trott (Republican)
- House District 12: Debbie Dingell (Democrat)
- House District 13: Vacant
- House District 14: Brenda Lawrence (Democrat)

== Population ==
In the 2010 United States Census, Michigan was recorded as having a population of 9,883,640 persons, ranking as the eighth most populous state in the country. By 2018, the state's population was estimated at 9,995,915, and the state had become the 10th most populous state.

The state's largest cities, having populations of at least 75,000 based on 2016 estimates, were as follows:

2018 Rank	City	County	2010 Pop.	2018 Pop.	Change 2010–18
1	Detroit	Wayne	713,777	672,662	−5.7% ▼
2	Grand Rapids	Kent	188,040	200,217	6.5% ▲
3	Warren	Macomb	134,056	134,587	0.4% ▲
4	Sterling Heights	Macomb	129,699	132,964	2.5% ▲
5	Ann Arbor	Washtenaw	113,934	121,890	7.0% ▲
6	Lansing	Ingham	114,297	118,427	3.6% ▲
7	Flint	Genesee	102,434	95,943	−6.3% ▼
8	Dearborn	Wayne	98,153	94,333	−3.9% ▼
9	Livonia	Wayne	96,942	93,971	−3.1% ▼
10	Troy	Oakland	80,980	84,272	4.1% ▲
11	Westland	Wayne	84,094	81,720	−2.8% ▼
12	Farmington Hills	Oakland	79,740	81,093	1.7% ▲
13	Kalamazoo	Kalamazoo	74,262	76,545	3.1% ▲
14	Wyoming	Kent	72,125	75,820	5.1% ▲

== Sports ==
=== Baseball ===
- 2018 Detroit Tigers season – In their first season under manager Ron Gardenhire, the Tigers compiled a 64–98 (.395) record and finished third in the American League Central. The team's statistical leaders included Nick Castellanos with a .298 batting average, 23 home runs, and 89 RBIs, Matthew Boyd with nine wins, and Alex Wilson with a 3.36 earned run average. The team's attendance at Comerica Park was 1,856,970.

=== American football ===
- 2018 Detroit Lions season – In their first season under head coach Matt Patricia, the Lions compiled a 6–10 record.
- 2018 Michigan Wolverines football team - In their fourth season under head coach Jim Harbaugh, the Wolverines compiled a 10–3 record.
- 2018 Michigan State Spartans football team - In their 12th season under head coach Mark Dantonio, the Spartans compiled a 7–6 record.
- 2018 Western Michigan Broncos football team - In their second season under head coach Tim Lester, the Broncos compiled a 7–6 record.
- 2018 Eastern Michigan Eagles football team - In their fifth season under head coach Chris Creighton, the Eagles compiled a 7–6 record.
- 2018 Central Michigan Chippewas football team - In their fourth season under head coach John Bonamego, the Chippewas compiled a 1–11 record.

=== Basketball ===
- 2017–18 Detroit Pistons season – In their fourth season under head coach Stan Van Gundy, the Pistons played for the first time in Little Caesars Arena. The team compiled a 39–43 (.476) record and finished fourth in the NBA's Central Division. The team's statistical leaders included Andre Drummond with 1,171 points and 1,247 total rebounds, and Ish Smith with 360 assists.
- 2017–18 Michigan Wolverines men's basketball team - In their 11th season under head coach John Beilein, the Wolverines compiled a 33–8 (13–5 Big Ten), won the Big Ten Conference tournament championship, and advanced to the Final Four. The team's statistical leaders included Mo Wagner with 570 points and 278 rebounds and Zavier Simpson with 150 assists.
- 2017–18 Michigan State Spartans men's basketball team - In their 23rd season under head coach Tom Izzo, the Spartans compiled a 30–5 (16–2 Big Ten) record, won the Big Ten regular season championship, and lost to Syracuse in the second round of the NCAA tournament. The team's statistical leaders included Miles Bridges with 582 points, Nick Ward with 249 rebounds, and Cassius Winston with 241 assists.
- 2017–18 Michigan Wolverines women's basketball team - In their sixth season under head coach Kim Barnes Arico, the Wolverines compiled a 23–10 (10–6 Big Ten) record, finished sixth in the Big Ten, and lost to Baylor in the second round of the NCAA women's tournament.
- 2017–18 Michigan State Spartans women's basketball team - In their 11th season under head coach Suzy Merchant, the Spartans compiled a 19–14 (7–9 Big Ten) record, tied for ninth place in the Big Ten, and lost in the third round of the Women's National Invitation Tournament.

=== Ice hockey ===
- 2017–18 Detroit Red Wings season – In their third season under head coach Jeff Blashill, the Red Wings played for the first time in Little Caesars Arena. The team compiled a 30–39–13 record and finished fifth in the NHL's Atlantic Division. The team's statistical leaders included Anthony Mantha with 24 goals and Dylan Larkin with 47 assists and 63 points. Jimmy Howard was the team's starting goalie in 57 games and had a goals against average of 2.85.
- 2017–18 Michigan Wolverines men's ice hockey season - Under first-year head coach Mel Pearson, the Wolverines compiled a 22–14–3 record and advanced to the Frozen Four.

== Music and culture ==
- February 8 - Diana Ross began a mini-residency at The Wynn Las Vegas Hotel & Casino
- March 16 - PRhyme 2, the second studio album from PRhyme, was released.
- March 23 - Boarding House Reach, the third studio album from Jack White, was released. The album reached No. 1 on the US Billboard 200 upon release.
- August 16 - Aretha Franklin died.
- August 17 - Motor City Muscle, a festival in downtown Detroit, features seven stages of music and an exhibition of muscle cars.
- August 31 - Eminem's 10th studio album Kamikaze was released. The album reached No. 1 on the US Billboard 200.
- September 14 - The feature film White Boy Rick, based on the true story of undercover police informant and drug dealer Richard Wershe Jr., was released.
- September 21 - Greatest Hits: You Never Saw Coming from Kid Rock was released.

== Chronology of events ==
=== January ===
- January 1 - The 2017 Michigan Wolverines football team lost to South Carolina, 26–19, in the 2018 Outback Bowl.
- January 1 - Jim Caldwell was fired as the head coach of the Detroit Lions.
- January 9 - Mike Duggan was sworn in for his second term as Mayor of Detroit.
- January 11 - Fiat Chrysler announced that it would invest more than $1 billion to modernize its Warren Truck Plant. The company also announced $2,000 bonuses to be paid to 60,000 U.S. employees and credited the federal tax legislation passed in December made the moves possible.
- January 15 - Jorge Garcia of Lincoln Park, a 30-year resident, father, and landscaper with no criminal record, was deported to Mexico. Garcia's story was selected as the No. 1 story of 2018 by the Detroit Free Press based on its page views on the newspaper's web site.
- January 16 - Larry Nassar's sentencing hearing began in Lansing, Michigan.
- January 17 - The Michigan Legislature overrode Gov. Rick Snyder's veto of a bill granting a sales tax break to persons trading in old vehicles.
- January 17 - Matt Patricia was hired as the new head coach of the Detroit Lions.
- January 20–28 - The North American International Auto Show was held at Cobo Center in Detroit.
- January 20 - Candice Diaz and Brad Fields were arraigned for felony murder, child abuse and torture in connection with the January 1 death of Diaz's four-year-old daughter, Gabrielle Barrett of Sumpter Township.
- January 23 - Michigan State University confirmed receipt of a letter from the NCAA opening a probe into the conduct of Larry Nassar.
- January 23 - Gov. Rick Snyder delivered his eighth and final State of the State address.
- January 25 - Larry Nassar was sentenced by Ingham County Judge Rosemarie Aquilina to 40 to 175 years following his conviction in the USA Gymnastics sex abuse scandal.
- January 25 - Michigan State University president Lou Anna Simon resigned amid criticism and controversy in the Larry Nassar scandal.
- January 26 - Michigan State students rally in support of victims of sexual assault.
- January 26 - Michigan State athletic director Mark Hollis resigned in the wake of the Nassar scandal.
- January 27 - The Detroit Free Press reports on its investigation into four alleged cases of sexual assault involving Michigan State football players.
- January 27 - Michigan attorney general Bill Schuette appointed a special prosecutor to investigate allegations of sexual abuse at Michigan State.
- January 29 - The Detroit Pistons engage in a trade that brings Blake Griffin to Detroit.
- January 30 - Former Michigan Governors John Engler and James Blanchard were named as interim president and senior adviser, respectively, at Michigan State.

=== February ===
- February 2- Special agents of the Michigan State Police and the Michigan Attorney General's office arrived without warning at Michigan State's administration building and removed records as part of the Attorney General's investigation into the Nassar scandal. Acting MSU president John Engler called the move a "political stunt".
- February 5 - Larry Nassar received a further sentence of 40 to 125 years in an Eaton County court.
- February 16 - Michigan State extended the contract for football coach Mark Dantonio through 2024.
- February 21 - Ford's North America president, Raj Nair, left his position after admitting to "inappropriate behavior". Kumar Galhotra was named as his replacement the following day.

=== March ===
- March 2 - Central Michigan University sophomore James Eric Davis Jr. shot and killed his mother and father when they came to campus to take him home for spring break. After the shooting, Davis fled and the campus was placed on lockdown. Around 15 hours later, police arrested him and took him to a local hospital. The shooting was selected as the No. 10 story of 2018 by the Detroit Free Press based on its page views on the newspaper's web site.
- March 2 - Michigan State Senator Bert Johnson of Highland Park resigned his seat and pled guilty to theft for putting a woman on the payroll at a salary of $23,000 in order to repay a loan he had received from her.
- March 4 - The Michigan Wolverines men's basketball team won the Big Ten Conference tournament.
- March 6 - WXYZ-TV anchor Malcolm Maddox was taken off air after a suit was filed by a former reporter accusing him of sexual harassment.
- March 7 - Wayne County reached agreement with Dan Gilbert's Rock Ventures to build a new $553-million jail in Detroit.
- March 11 - Education Secretary Betsy DeVos appeared on 60 Minutes and struggled to answer questions about under-performing Michigan schools.
- March 13 - FBI crime statistics were released showing Grosse Ile to be the safest city (greater than 10,000 population) in the United States. Of the 25 safest cities in the state, 19 were in Oakland County.
- March 16 - The National Park Service announced that it would introduce 20 to 30 wolves to the Isle Royale National Park over three years to bolster the population and assist in controlling the moose herd.
- March 27 - A judge in Port Huron ousted the Tea Party's Karen Spranger as Macomb County clerk/register of deeds, ruling that she was not legally elected in November 2016 due to the fact that she had lied about her residency in Macomb County. The Court ordered her to be removed immediately from office.

=== April ===
- April 5 - Hazel Park Raceway closed for business after 70 years.

=== June ===
- June 4 - The Michigan Attorney General filed charges against Joseph Hattey, a Michigan State University physicist, for bestiality involving sexual conduct with a dog.
- June 4 - The Detroit Tigers selected Casey Mize with the No. 1 overall pick in the 2018 Major League Baseball draft.
- June 11 - The U.S. Department of Justice filed a statement of interest in a federal suit challenging the University of Michigan's free speech code.
- June 11 - Ford Motor Company announced its acquisition of Detroit's Michigan Central Station and plans to convert the building into a campus for advanced automotive technology.
- June 11 - The Detroit Pistons hired Dwane Casey as their new head coach.
- June 14 - U.S. Senator Debbie Stabenow and several state legislators called for John Engler to resign as interim president of Michigan State University. Emails were published the prior day in which Engler accused a survivor of the USA Gymnastics sex abuse scandal of taking kickbacks from attorneys.

=== August ===
- August 7 - During the Democratic primary for a Michigan Senate seat, state representative Bettie Cook Scott drew fire after calling her opponent, Stephanie Chang, "ching chong" or "ching chang" and accusing one of Chang's campaign volunteers of being an "immigrant," saying "you don't belong here" and "I want you out of my country."
- August 9 - Rashida Tlaib won the Democratic primary to take over the Congressional seat previously occupied by John Conyers. She became the first Muslim woman and the first Palestinian-American woman in Congress.
- August 10 - The Detroit Red Wings signed Dylan Larkin to a five-year, $30.5 million contract.
- August 12 - The Detroit Tigers held a ceremony at Comerica Park to retire Jack Morris's jersey No. 47.
- August 14 - The University of Michigan Hospital was ranked as the No. 5 hospital in the United States by U.S. News & World Report.
- August 15 - The Detroit Free Press reported that Michigan State interim president John Engler censored the cover of the school's alumni magazine featuring imagery used by sexual assault victims. The replacement issue featured a more positive spin on the Nassar scandal and a less controversial cover.
- August 16 - Aretha Franklin died.
- August 18 - The annual Woodward Dream Cruise was held along Woodward Avenue in Metro Detroit.
- August 20 - Democrat Gretchen Whitmer announced her selection of Garlin Gilchrist as her running mate in the 2018 Michigan gubernatorial election.
- August 24 - Former Michigan State gymnastics coach Kathie Klages was charged with lying to police in connection with the USA Gymnastics sex abuse scandal. Klages was alleged to have lied to Michigan State Police about having been told about Larry Nassar's sexual misconduct. Witnesses came forward stating that Klages had received reports of sexual abuse some 20 years earlier.
- August 26 - The Detroit Tigers held a ceremony at Comerica Park to retire Alan Trammell's jersey No. 3.
- August 27 - Fiat Chrysler executive Al Iacobelli was sentenced to 5 1/2 years in prison for diverting $4.5 million intended for worker training to himself and UAW officials.
- August 31 - The funeral of Aretha Franklin was broadcast on national television and held at Greater Grace Temple in Detroit. The ceremony included speeches and musical performances by Stevie Wonder, Ariana Grande, Jesse Jackson, Bill Clinton, and others. A 50-minute eulogy by Jasper Williams Jr., critical of black families, was deemed offensive by Franklin's family.

=== September ===
- September 7 - The U.S. Circuit Court of Appeals ruled that the University of Michigan must allow students accused of sexual assault to cross-examine their accusers at a live hearing.
- September 12 - The Detroit Free Press reported on a lawsuit alleging that former Michigan State athletic director George Perles forced the school's field hockey coach in 1992 to (a) return a videotape of a sexual assault by Larry Nassar against a field hockey player, (b) resign, and (c) sign a non-disclosure agreement.
- September 14 - Detroit Red Wings captain Henrik Zetterberg announced his retirement.

=== November ===
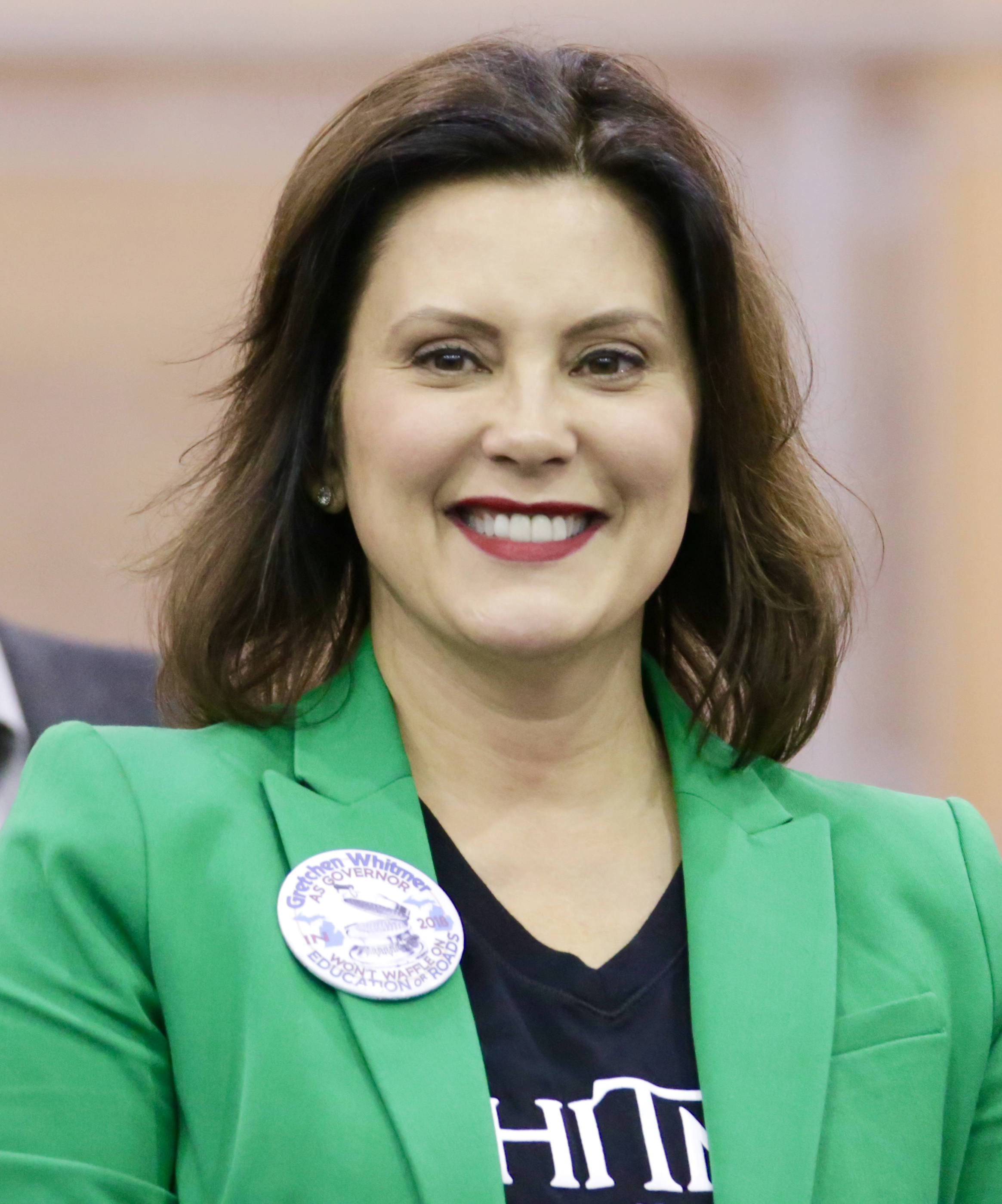
Gretchen Whitmer

- November 6 - Women of the Democratic party dominated the November 6 elections. Key results included the following:

- Democrat Gretchen Whitmer of East Lansing received 2,149,014 votes to defeat Republican Bill Schuette who received 1,801,878 votes in the gubernatorial election.
- Incumbent Democratic U.S. Senator Debbie Stabenow received 2,098,244 votes to defeat Republican challenger John E. James who received 1,878,260 votes.
- Democrat Dana Nessel received 1,921,947 votes to defeat Republican Tom Leonard who received 1,855,529 votes for Michigan Attorney General.
- Democrat Jocelyn Benson received 2,096,301 votes to defeat Republican Mary Lang who received 1,782,577 votes for Michigan Secretary of State.
- Democrat Elissa Slotkin received 172,880 votes (50.6%) to defeat incumbent Republican Mike Bishop who received 159,782 votes (46.8%) in Michigan's 8th Congressional District (northern Oakland, Livingston, and Ingham Counties).
- Democrat Haley Stevens received 181,912 votes (51.8%) to defeat Republican Lena Epstein who received 158,463 votes (45.2%) in Michigan's 11th Congressional District (western Wayne and southern Oakland Counties). The seat had previously been held by Republican Dave Trott.
- Incumbent Democrat Debbie Dingell received 68% of the votes to defeat Republican Jeff Jones (29%) in Michigan's 12th Congressional District (downriver, parts of Wayne and Washtenaw Counties).
- Democrat Rashida Tlaib received 83% of the votes with no Republican adversary in Michigan's 13th Congressional District (central Detroit, parts of western Wayne County). She won the seat that had been occupied by Democrat John Conyers since 1965.
- Incumbent Democrat Brenda Lawrence received 95% of the votes to win reelection in Michigan's 14th Congressional District (part of Detroit, Grosse Pointes, Oakland County).

- November 6 - Proposal 1, a.k.a. the Michigan Regulation and Taxation of Marihuana Act, a statewide ballot proposal, passed by a margin of 56% to 44%, making Michigan became the first state in the Midwest to legalize marijuana for adult recreational use. (Medicinal use of marijuana had been legalized in Michigan pursuant to an earlier 2008 ballot initiative.) Proposal 1 was selected as the No. 2 story of 2018 by the Detroit Free Press based on its page views on the newspaper's web site.

=== December ===
- December 13 - Jessica Starr, meteorologist for Fox 2 Detroit (WJBK-TV) died by suicide. She was out of work for several weeks after an October lasik procedure resulted in complications. Starr's suicide was selected as the No. 3 story of 2018 by the Detroit Free Press based on its page views on the newspaper's web site.

== Deaths ==
- January 29 - Julia Reyes Taubman, photographer, author and co-founder of the Museum of Contemporary Art Detroit, at age 50 in Bloomfield Hills, Michigan
- February 1 - Dennis Edwards, frontman in The Temptations, at age 74 in Chicago
- February 12 - Art Van Elslander, founder of Art Van furniture, at age 87
- February 23 - Ron Ilitch, son of Mike Ilitch, in a Troy hotel room of an apparent drug overdose at age 61
- March 1 - Dorne Dibble, wide receiver for Detroit Lions (1951–1957), at age 88 in Northville
- March 7 - William J. Pulte, Detroit area builder whose company became the country's largest home builder, at age 85 in Naples, Florida
- March 29 - Rusty Staub, DH for Detroit Tigers (1976–1979), at age 73 in Florida
- April 3 - Ron Dunbar, Motown songwriter ("Give Me Just a Little More Time", "Band of Gold", and "Patches"), at age 78
- April 14 - Daedra Charles, Women's Basketball Hall of Fame and Detroit native, at age 49
- April 21 - Verne Troyer, Michigan native and actor best known for playing Mini-Me, at age 49 in Los Angeles
- June 28 - Mike Kilkenny, pitcher for Detroit Tigers (1969–1972), at age 73 in London, Ontario
- July 6 - Bruce Maher, defensive back for University of Detroit and Detroit Lions (1960–1967), at age 80
- July 10 - Darryl Rogers, head football coach at Michigan State (1976–1979) and Detroit Lions (1985–1988), at age 84 in California
- August 16 - Aretha Franklin, at age 76 in Detroit
- August 17 - Paul Naumoff, linebacker for Detroit Lions (1967–1978), at age 73 in Tennessee
- August 20 - Eddie Willis, guitarist in Motown's Funk Brothers, at age 82 in Gore Springs, Mississippi
- September 6 - Richard DeVos, billionaire founder of Amway, at age 92 in Ada Township, Michigan
- September 6 - Burt Reynolds, actor and native of Lansing, at age 82 in Florida
- September 28 - Thomas E. Brennan, Michigan Supreme Court (1967–1973), at age 89 in Lansing
- November 8 - Wallace Triplett, third African-American selected in an NFL Draft (by the Lions in 1949), at age 92 in Detroit
- November 10 - Ron Johnson, Michigan halfback who set an NCAA record with 347 rushing yards in a game, at age 71 in New Jersey

=== Gallery of 2018 deaths ===
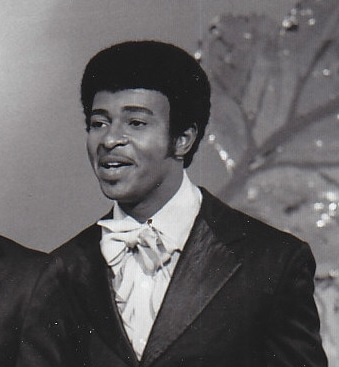
Dennis Edwards

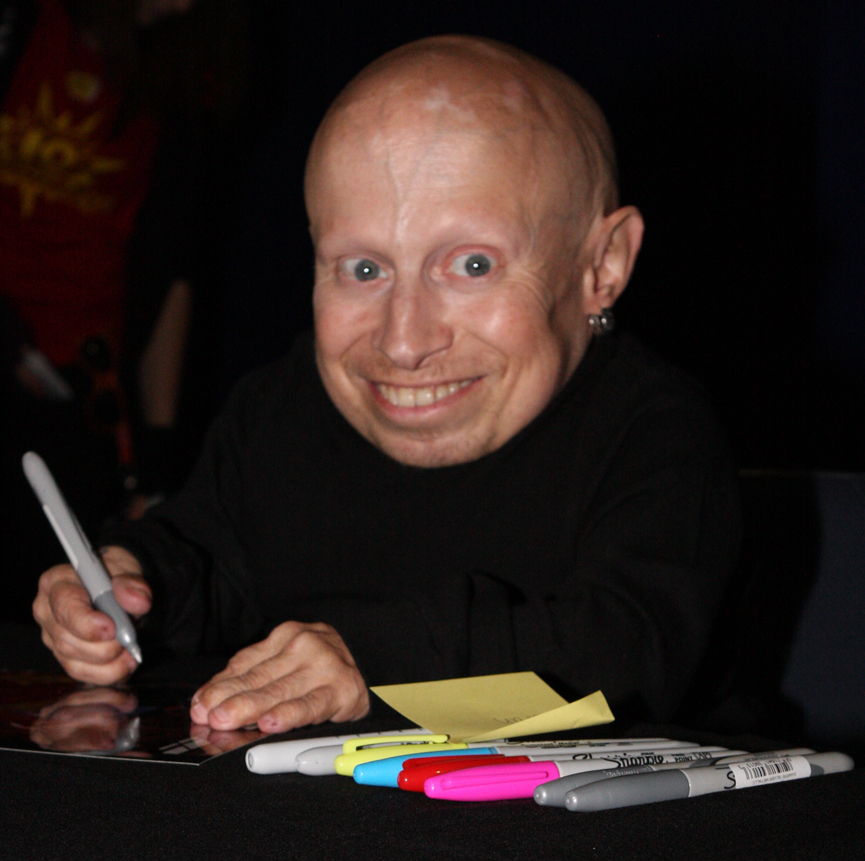
Verne Troyer

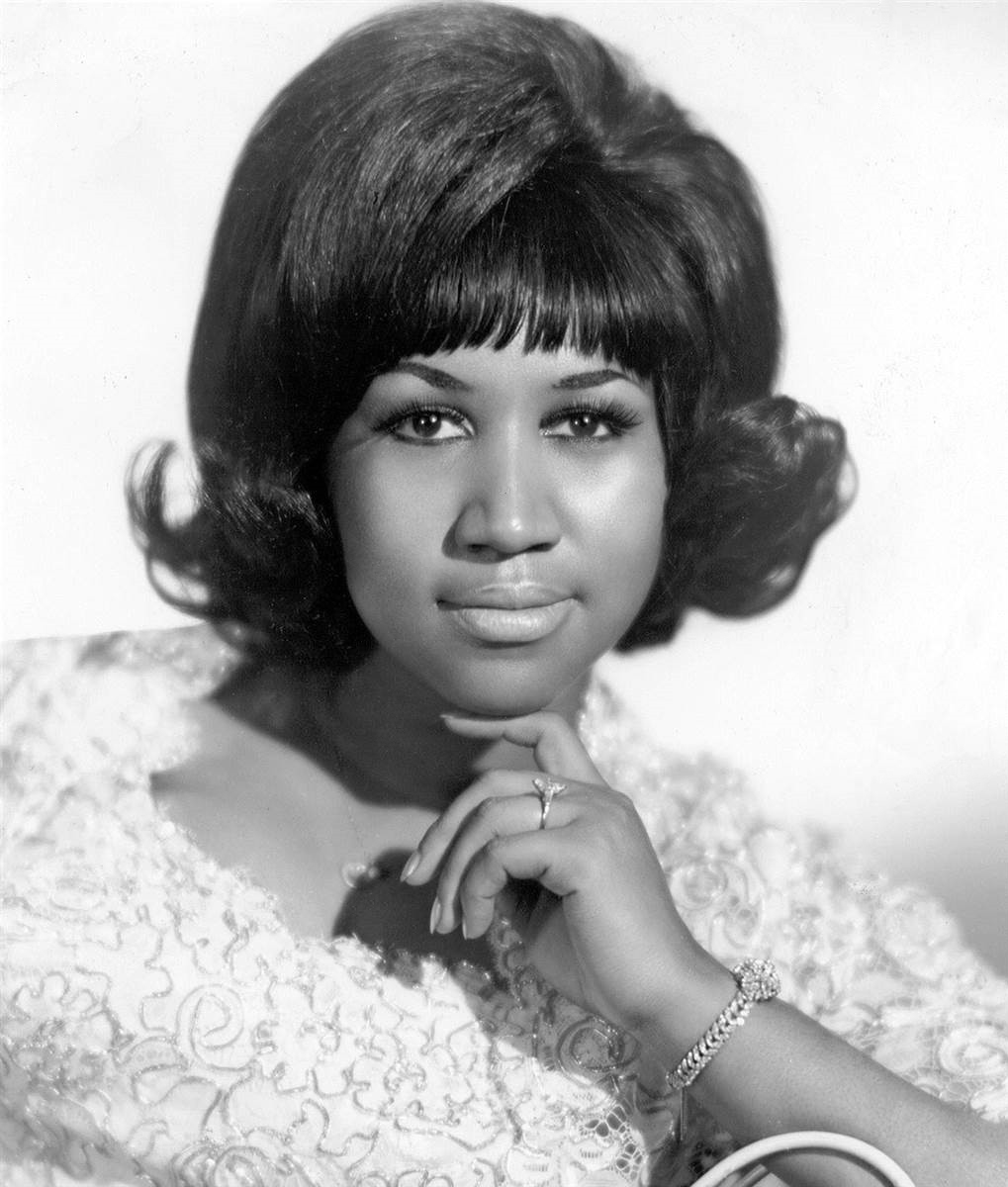
Aretha Franklin

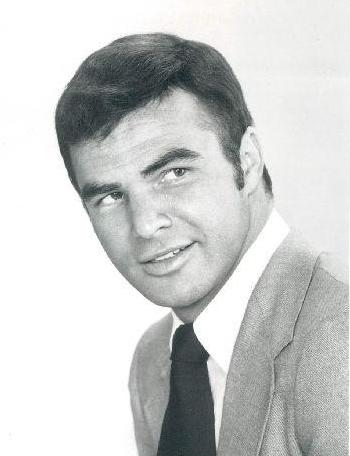
Burt Reynolds

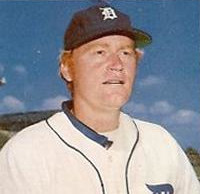
Rusty Staub

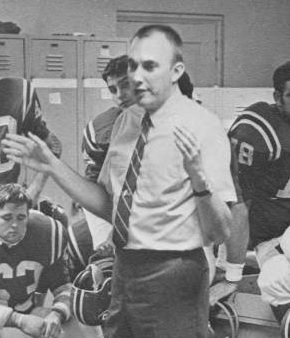
Darryl Rogers

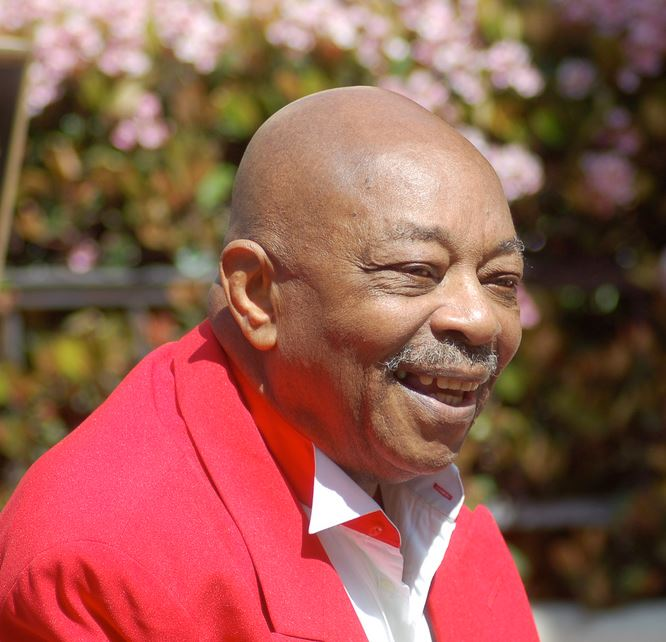
Eddie Willis

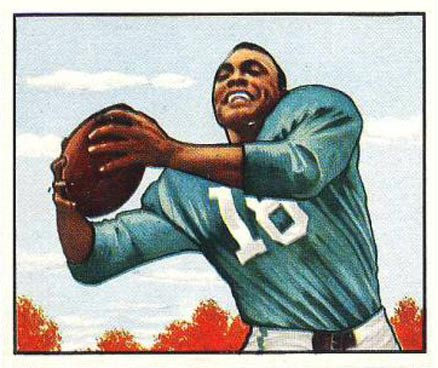
Wallace Triplett

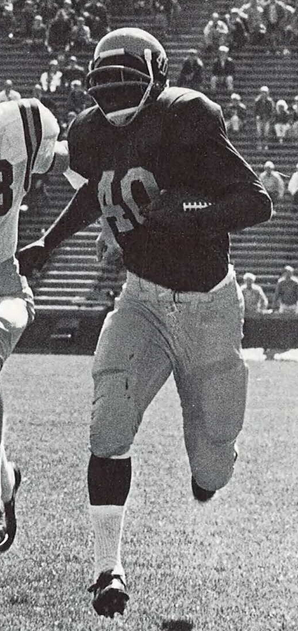
Ron Johnson

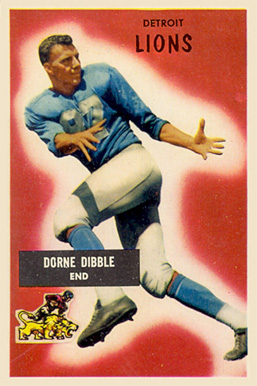
Dorne Dibble

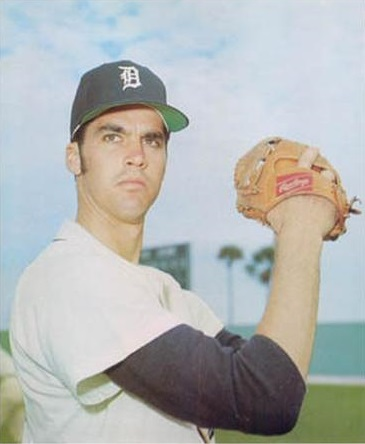
Mike Kilkenny

== See also ==
- History of Michigan
- History of Detroit
