= 2016 in Michigan =

- Decades: 1990s; 2000s; 2010s; 2020s
- See also: History of Michigan; Historical outline of Michigan; List of years in Michigan; 2016 in the United States

Events from the year 2016 in Michigan.

The Detroit Free Press (DFP) and Lansing State Journal (LSJ) both published year-end recaps of the year's top news stories. The only story to appear on both lists was Donald Trump's narrow electoral victory in Michigan by 11,000 votes (and the recount requested by Green Party candidate Jill Stein). Other top stories included:

- Criminal charges against four city officials in the Flint water crisis (DFP);
- The USA Gymnastics sex abuse scandal involving former Michigan State doctor Larry Nassar (LSJ);
- The 2016 Kalamazoo shootings in which an Uber driver killed 6 persons (DFP);
- A massacre in which Gregory Green of Dearborn Heights killed his four children and step-children and tortured his wife (DFP);
- A federal criminal investigation into Detroit's blight demolition program (DFP);
- Investments by Detroit's Big Three in self-driving automobiles (DFP);
- The Detroit Pistons' return to Detroit and the opening of Little Caesars Arena (DFP);
- Conviction of Detroit TV anchor and city council president Charles Pugh for having sex with a minor (DFP);
- Death of 12 persons in a Flint outbreak of Legionnaire's disease (DFP);
- A corruption scandal involving officials in Macomb County and trash giant Rizzo Environmental Services.

== Office holders ==
=== State office holders ===
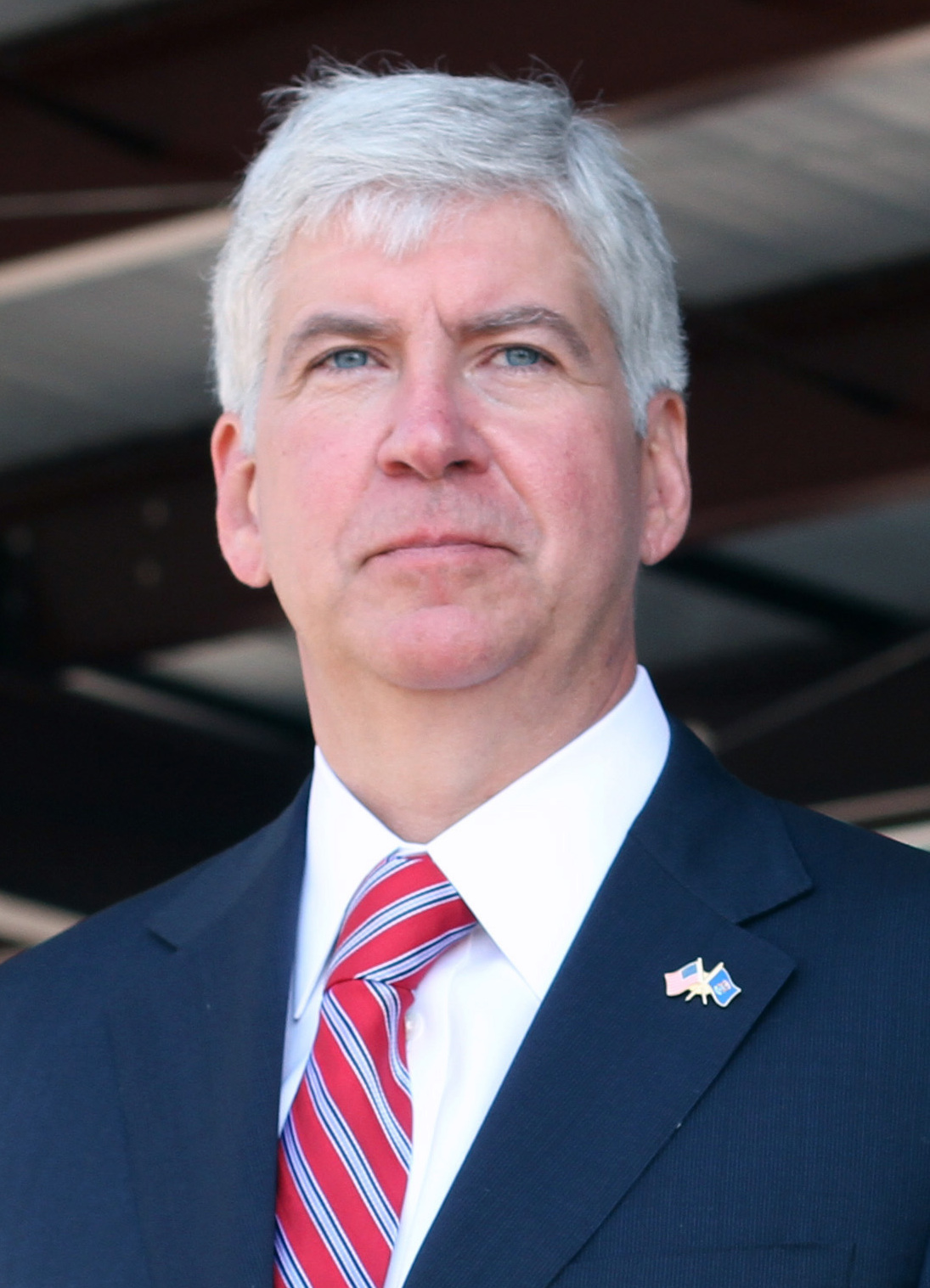
Rick Snyder

- Governor of Michigan: Rick Snyder (Republican)
- Lieutenant Governor of Michigan: Brian Calley (Republican)
- Michigan Attorney General: Bill Schuette (Republican)
- Michigan Secretary of State: Ruth Johnson (Republican)
- Speaker of the Michigan House of Representatives: Kevin Cotter (Republican)
- Majority Leader of the Michigan Senate: Arlan Meekhof (Republican)
- Chief Justice, Michigan Supreme Court: Robert P. Young Jr.

=== Mayors of major cities ===
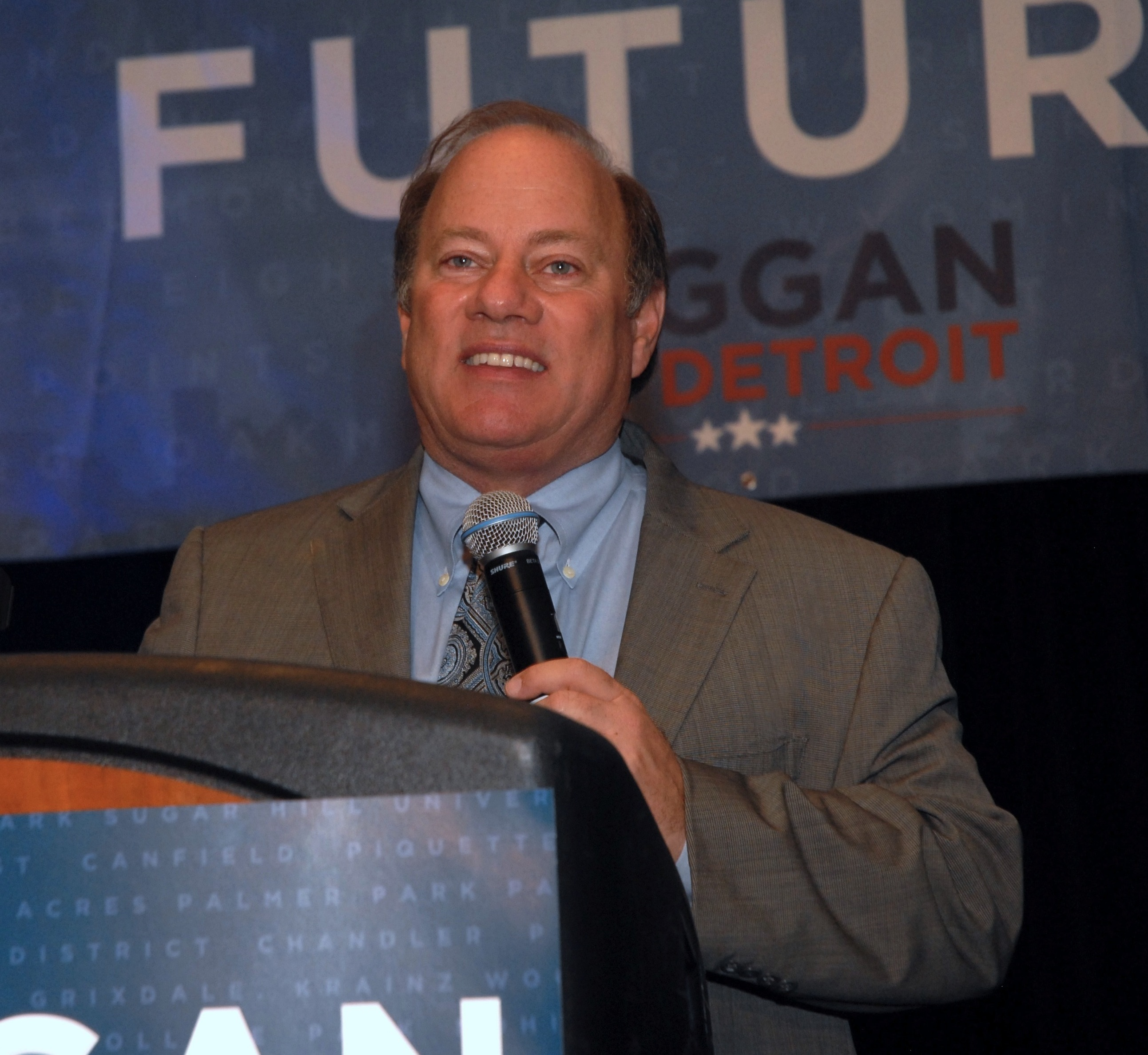
Mike Duggan

- Mayor of Detroit: Mike Duggan (Democrat)
- Mayor of Grand Rapids: George Heartwell/Rosalynn Bliss
- Mayor of Warren, Michigan: James R. Fouts
- Mayor of Sterling Heights, Michigan: Michael C. Taylor
- Mayor of Ann Arbor: Christopher Taylor (Democrat)
- Mayor of Dearborn: John B. O'Reilly Jr.
- Mayor of Lansing: Virgil Bernero
- Mayor of Flint: Dayne Walling/Karen Weaver
- Mayor of Saginaw: Dennis Browning

=== Federal office holders ===
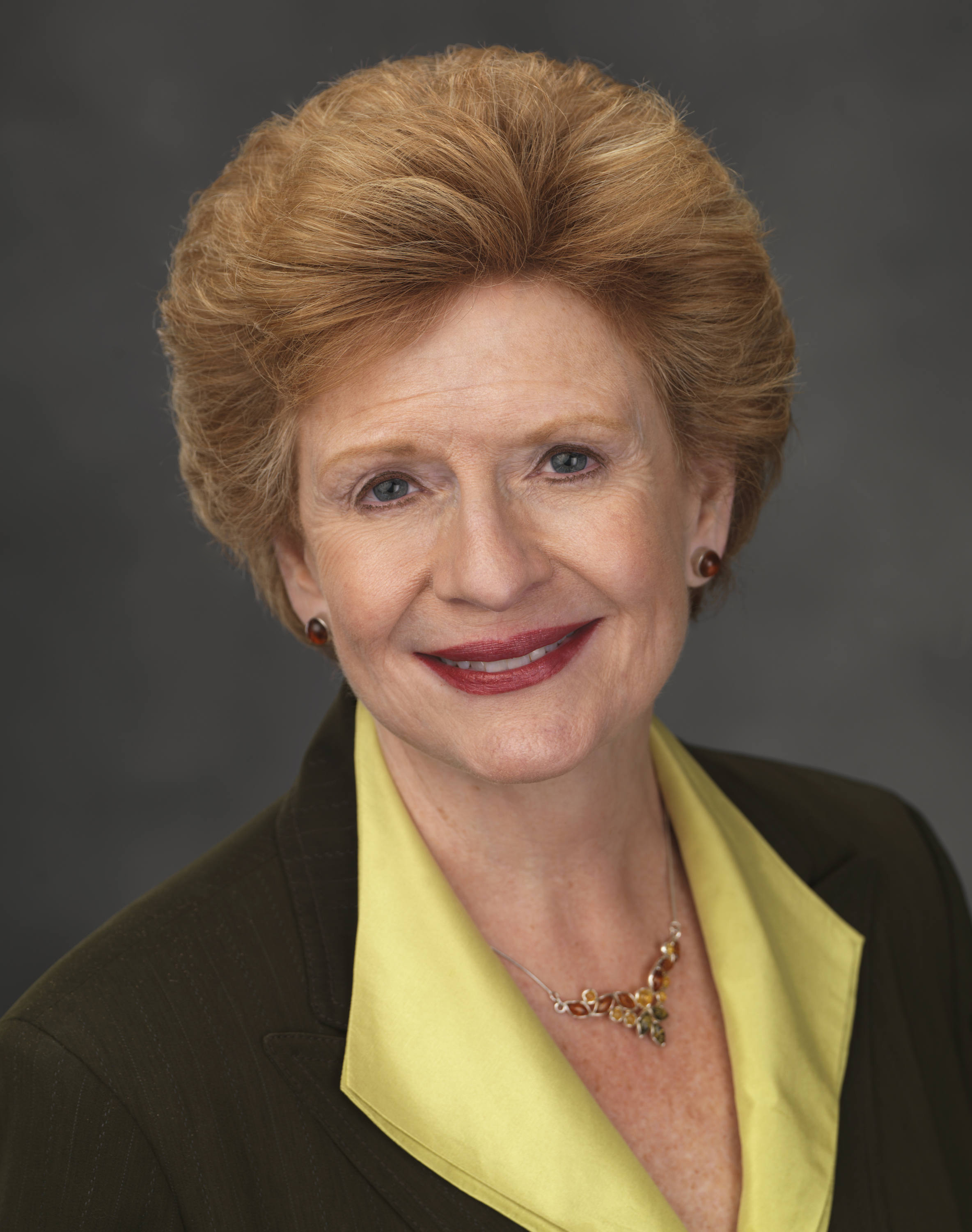
Debbie Stabenow

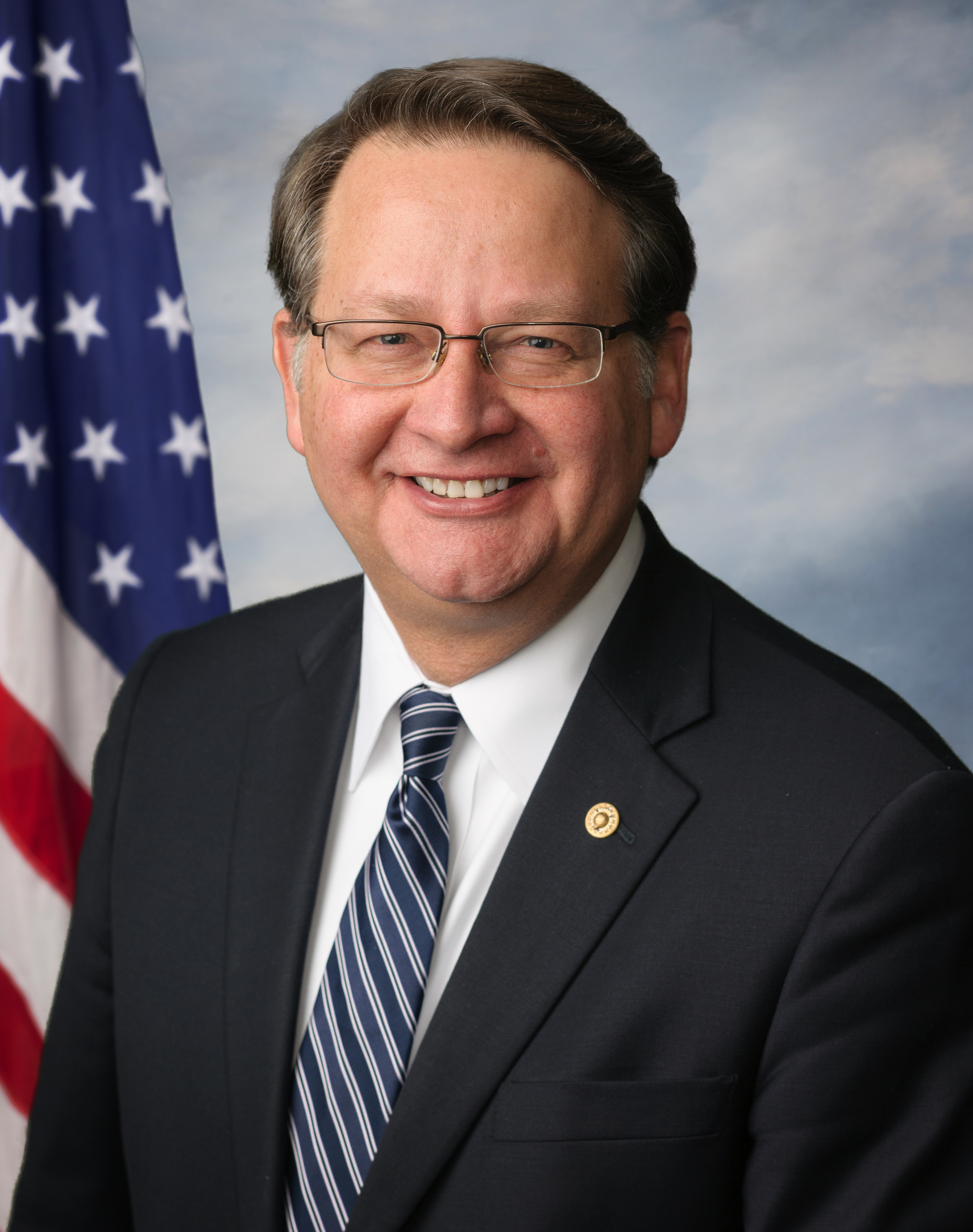
Gary Peters

- U.S. Senator from Michigan: Debbie Stabenow (Democrat)
- U.S. Senator from Michigan: Gary Peters (Democrat)
- House District 1: Dan Benishek (Republican)
- House District 2: Bill Huizenga (Republican)
- House District 3: Justin Amash (Republican)
- House District 4: John Moolenaar (Republican)
- House District 5: Dan Kildee (Democrat)
- House District 6: Fred Upton (Republican)
- House District 7: Tim Walberg (Republican)
- House District 8: Mike Bishop (Republican)
- House District 9: Sander Levin (Democrat)
- House District 10: Candice Miller (Republican)
- House District 11: David Trott (Republican)
- House District 12: Debbie Dingell (Democrat)
- House District 13: John Conyers (Democrat)
- House District 14: Brenda Lawrence (Democrat)

== Population ==
In the 2010 United States Census, Michigan was recorded as having a population of 9,883,640 persons, ranking as the eighth most populous state in the country. By 2017, the state's population was estimated at 9,962,311, and the state had become the 10th most populous state.

The state's largest cities, having populations of at least 75,000 based on 2016 estimates, were as follows:

2017 Rank	City	County	2010 Pop.	2016 Pop.	Change 2010-16
1	Detroit	Wayne	713,777	672,795	−5.7% ▼
2	Grand Rapids	Kent	188,040	196,445	4.5% ▲
3	Warren	Macomb	134,056	135,125	0.8% ▲
4	Sterling Heights	Macomb	129,699	132,427	2.1% ▲
5	Ann Arbor	Washtenaw	113,934	120,782	6.0% ▲
6	Lansing	Ingham	114,297	116,020	1.5% ▲
7	Flint	Genesee	102,434	97,386	−4.9% ▼
8	Dearborn	Wayne	98,153	94,444	−3.8% ▼
9	Livonia	Wayne	96,942	94,041	−3.0% ▼
10	Troy	Oakland	80,980	83,641	3.3% ▲
11	Westland	Wayne	84,094	81,545	−3.0% ▼
12	Farmington Hills	Oakland	79,740	81,129	1.7% ▲
13	Kalamazoo	Kalamazoo	74,262	75,984	2.3% ▲
14	Wyoming	Kent	72,125	75,567	4.8% ▲

== Sports ==
=== Baseball ===
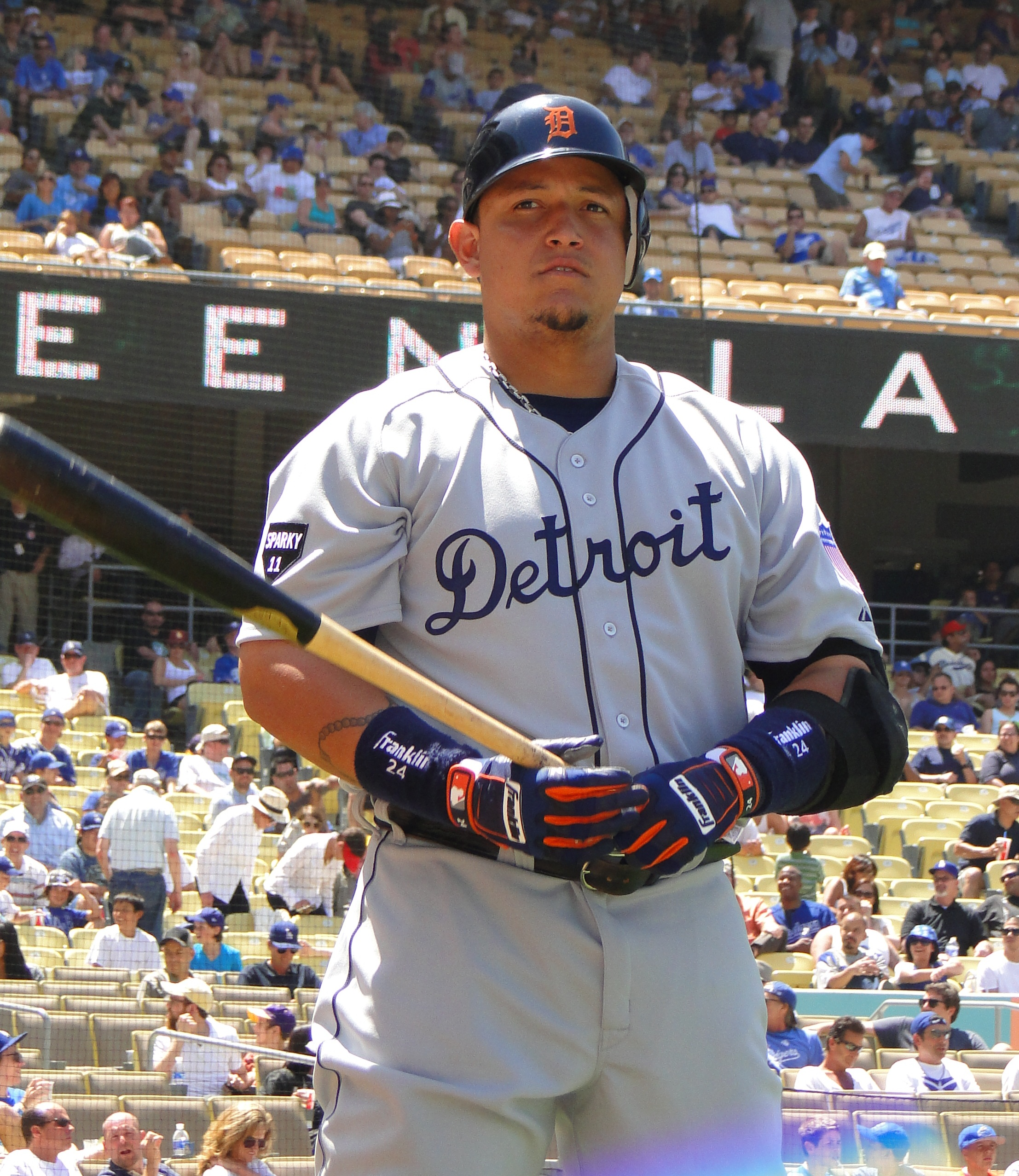
Miguel Cabrera

- 2016 Detroit Tigers season – Under manager Brad Ausmus, the Tigers compiled a 86–75 record and finished second in American League Central Division. The team's statistical leaders included Miguel Cabrera with a .316 batting average, 38 home runs, and 108 RBIs, and Justin Verlander with 16 wins and a 2.96 earned run average.
- 2016 Michigan Wolverines baseball team - Under head coach Erik Bakich, the Wolverines compiled a 36–21 record.
- 2016 Michigan Wolverines softball team - Under head coach Carol Hutchins, the Wolverines compiled a 52–7 record.

=== American football ===
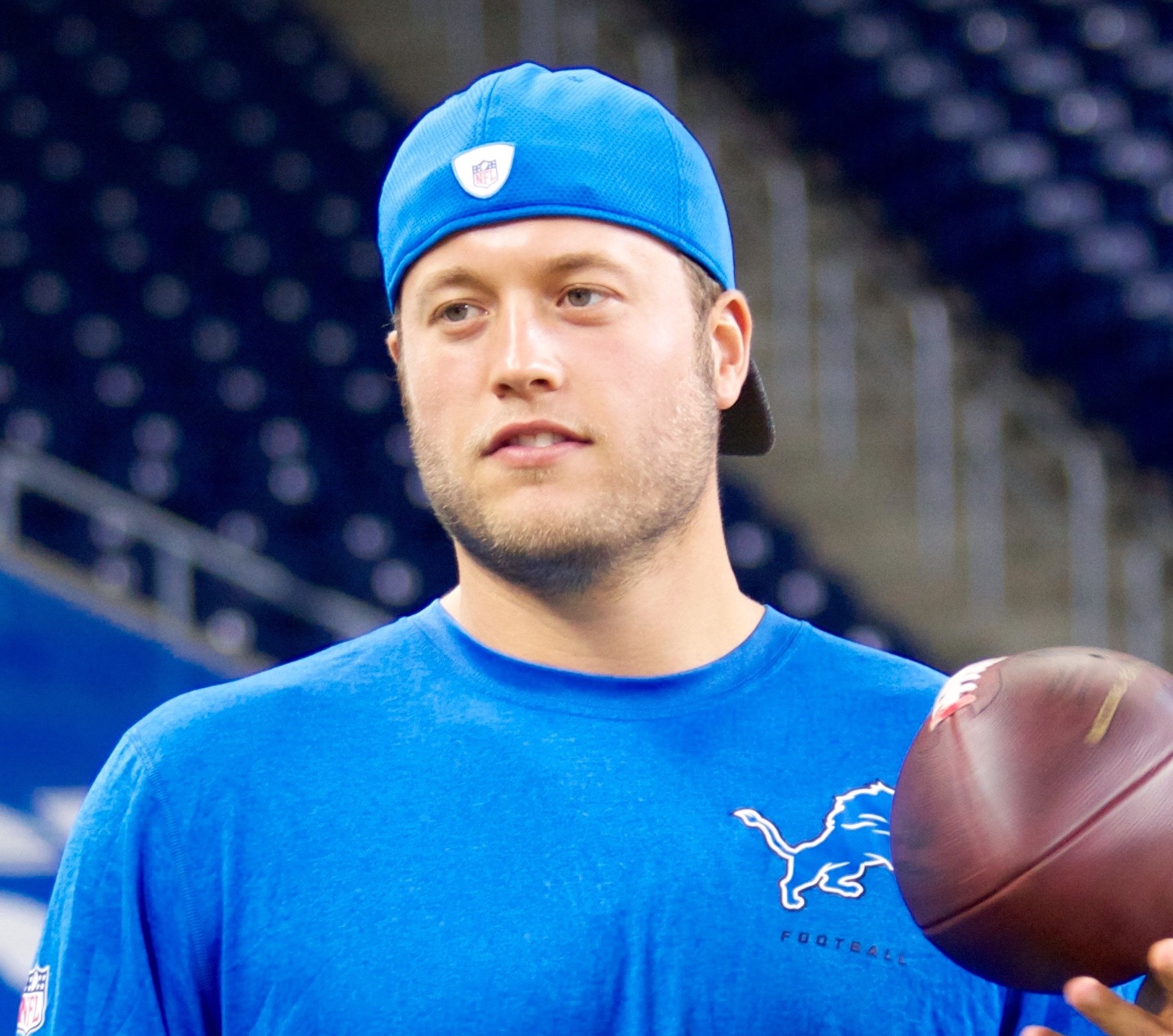
Matthew Stafford

- 2016 Detroit Lions season – Under head coach Jim Caldwell, the Lions compiled a 9–7 record and finished second in the NFC North Division. The team's statistical leaders included Matthew Stafford with 4,327 passing yards, Theo Riddick with 357 rushing yards, Golden Tate with 1,077 receiving yards, and Matt Prater with 124 points scored.
- 2016 Michigan Wolverines football team - Under head coach Jim Harbaugh, the team compiled a 10–3 and was ranked No. 10 in the final AP Poll. The team's statistical leaders included Wilton Speight with 2,538 passing yards, De'Veon Smith with 846 rushing yards, Amara Darboh with 862 receiving yards, and Kenneth Allen with 110 points scored.
- 2016 Western Michigan Broncos football team - Under head coach P. J. Fleck, the Broncos compiled a 13–0 record in the regular season before losing to Wisconsin in the Cotton Bowl Classic. The Broncos were ranked No. 15 in the final AP Poll.
- 2016 Michigan State Spartans football team - Under head coach Mark Dantonio, the Spartans compiled a 3–9 record.
- 2016 Central Michigan Chippewas football team - Under head coach John Bonamego, the Chippewas compiled a 6–7 record.
- 2016 Eastern Michigan Eagles football team - Under head coach Chris Creighton, the Eagles compiled a 5–7 record.

=== Basketball ===
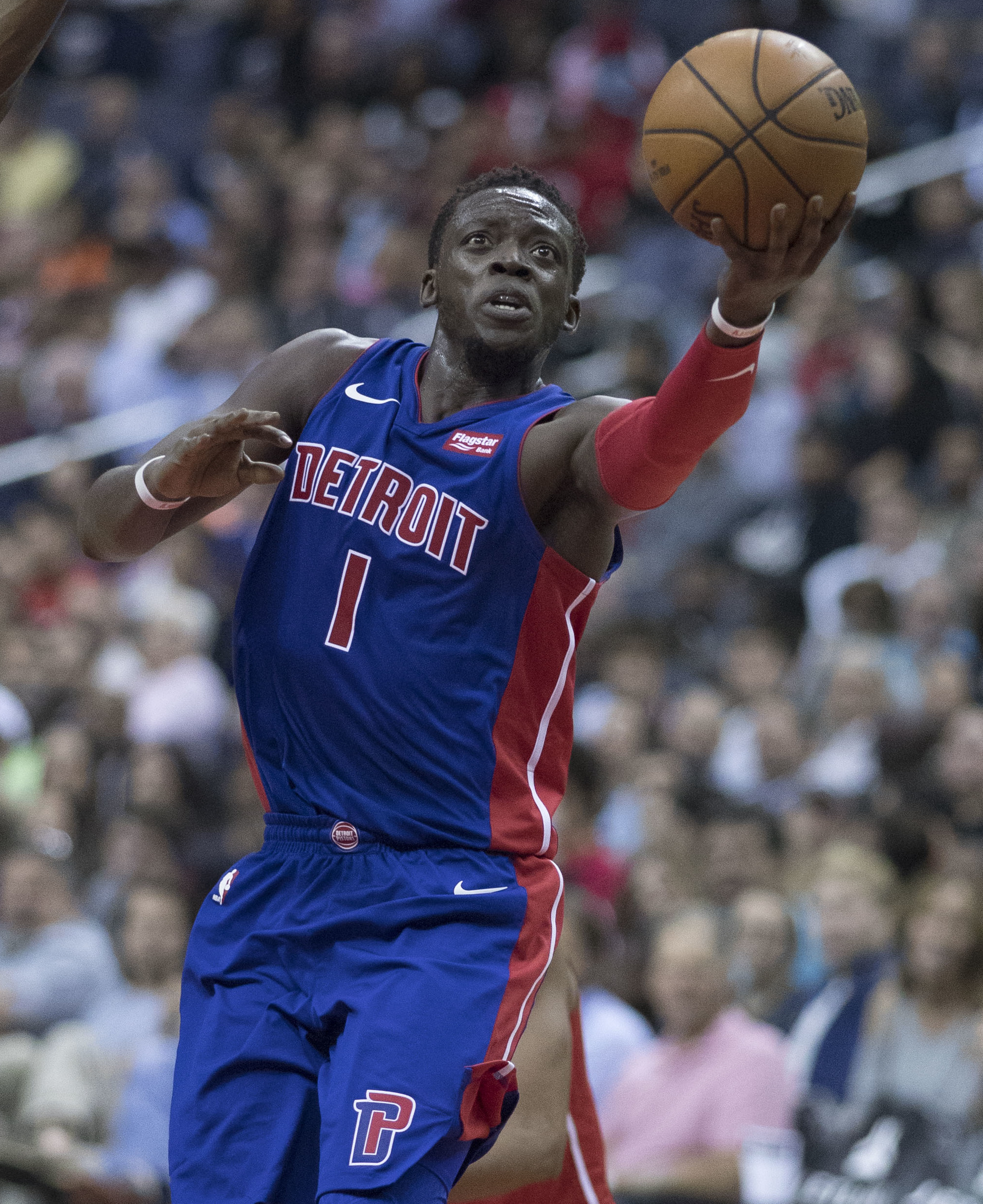
Reggie Jackson

- 2015–16 Detroit Pistons season – Under head coach Stan Van Gundy, the Pistons compiled a 44–38 record. The team's statistical leaders included Reggie Jackson with 1,489 points and with 492 assists and Andre Drummond with 1,198 rebounds.
- 2015–16 Michigan State Spartans men's basketball team - Under head coach Tom Izzo, the Spartans compiled a 29–6 record and won the Big Ten championship. The team's statistical leaders included Denzel Valentine with 595 points and 241 assists and Matt Costello with 288 rebounds.
- 2015–16 Michigan Wolverines men's basketball team - Under head coach John Beilein, the Wolverines compiled a 23–13 record. The team's statistical leaders included Zak Irvin with 412 points and Derrick Walton with 180 rebounds and 147 assists.
- 2015–16 Detroit Titans men's basketball team - Under head coach Ray McCallum, the Titans compiled a 16–15 record.
- 2015–16 Michigan State Spartans women's basketball team - Under head coach Suzy Merchant, the Spartans compiled a 25–9 record and was ranked No. 16 in the final AP Poll.
- 2015–16 Michigan Wolverines women's basketball team - Under head coach Kim Barnes, the Wolverines compiled a 21–14 record.

=== Ice hockey ===
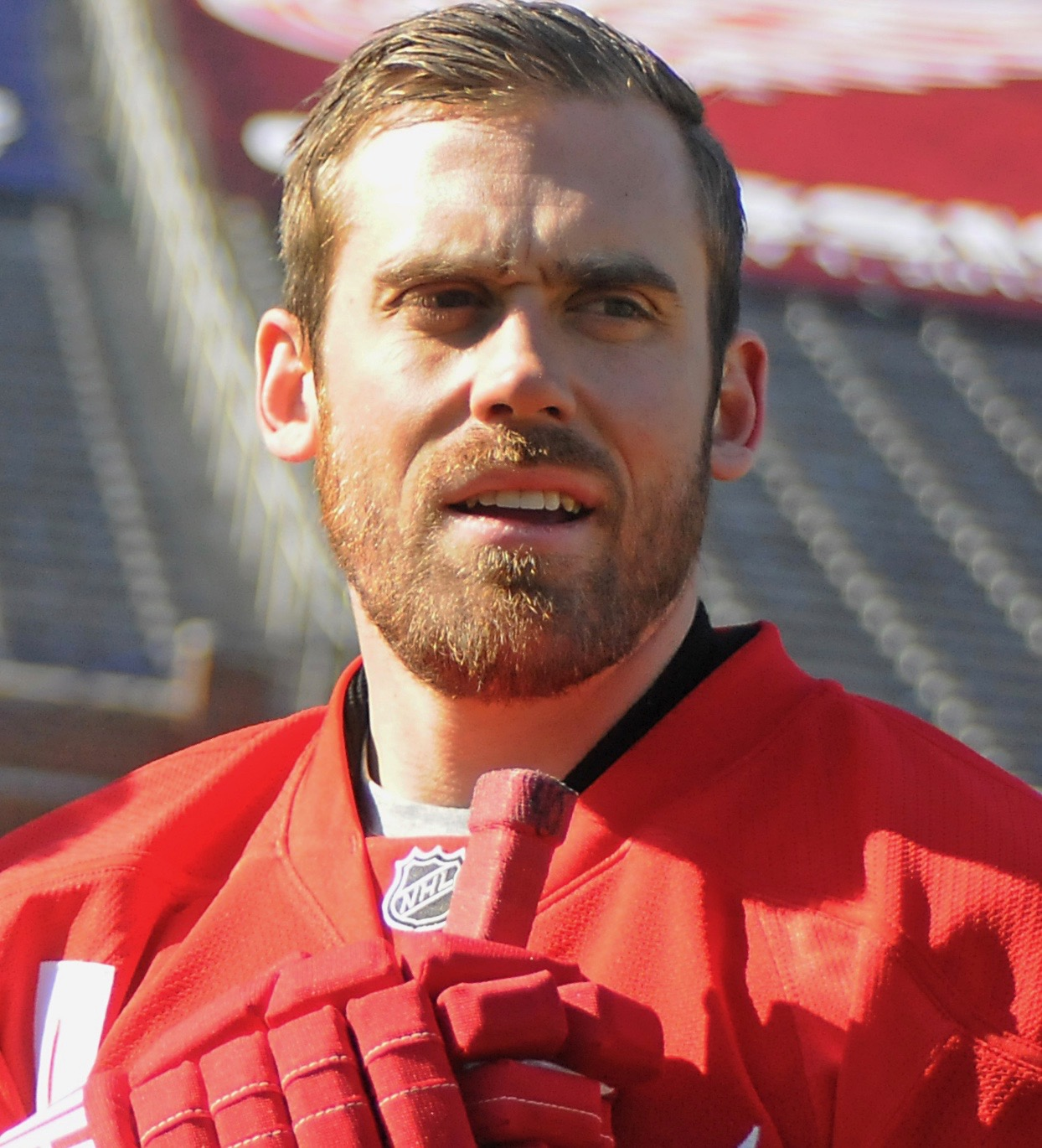
Henrik Zetterberg

- 2015–16 Detroit Red Wings season – Under head coach Jeff Blashill, the Red Wings compiled a 41–30–11 record and finished third in the NHL Atlantic Division. The team statistical leaders included Henrik Zetterberg with 37 assists and 50 points and Dylan Larkin with 23 goals. The team's goaltenders were Petr Mrázek (54 games) and Jimmy Howard (37 games started).
- 2015–16 Michigan Wolverines men's ice hockey team - In their 29th season under head coach Red Berenson, the Wolverines compiled a 25-8-5 record.
- 2016–17 Michigan State Spartans men's ice hockey team - Under head coach Tom Anastos, the Spartans compiled a 10–23–4 record.

=== Racing ===
- Port Huron to Mackinac Boat Race -
- Pure Michigan 400 - Dale Jarrett was the winner
- Detroit Grand Prix - not held

=== Other ===
- Michigan Open - Jeff Bronkema was the winner

== Music ==
- March 18 - Post Pop Depression by Iggy Pop was released
- April 15 - The Diary by J Dilla was released
- April 15 - Layers by Royce da 5'9" was released
- September 27 - Atrocity Exhibition by Danny Brown was released
- 2016 - Omar-S The Best by Omar-S was released
- 2016 - Lead Poison by Elzhi was released
- 2016 - "Slow Motion" by Stef Chura is picked as one of the five best songs of 2016 by Detroit Music Magazine

== Chronology of events ==
=== February ===
- February 20 - an Uber driver in Kalamazoo goes on a shooting spree (2016 Kalamazoo shootings), killing six persons and injuring two others

=== March ===
- A special election is held in three districts of the Michigan House of Representatives.

=== June ===
- June 7 - a pickup truck plowed into a group of bicyclists north of Kalamazoo, killing five and injuring four others

=== July ===
- July 11 - an escaped prisoner grabbed a gun and killed two bailiffs in a courthouse in St. Joseph, Michigan

== Deaths ==
- January 16 - Ted Marchibroda, University of Detroit quarterback and NFL coach, at age 84 in Virginia
- January 18 - Glenn Frey, singer, songwriter, and member of The Eagles, at age 67 in New York
- February 17 - Tony Phillips, Detroit Tigers (1990–1994), at age 56 in Scottsdale, Arizona
- February 29 - Gil Hill, Detroit city councilman and actor known for role in Beverly Hills Cop, at age 84 in Detroit
- March 5 - Al Wistert, football player at Michigan and in NFL, at age 95 in Oregon
- March 27 - Curtis Hertel, Speaker of Michigan House of Representatives, at age 63
- April 5 - Roman Gribbs, Mayor of Detroit (1970–1974), at age 90 in Northville
- April 12 - Paul Carey, radio play-by-play announcer for Detroit Tigers (1973–1991), at age 88 in Rochester, Michigan
- April 19 - Milt Pappas, MLB pitcher and Detroit native, at age 76 in Illinois
- May 8 - Shirley E. Schwartz, automotive scientist, at age 80 in Ann Arbor
- May 13 - Dick McAuliffe, second baseman for Detroit Tigers (1960–1973), at age 76 in Connecticut
- June 10 - Gordie Howe, Mr. Hockey played for Detroit Red Wings (1946–1971), at age 88 in Sylvania, Ohio
- June 13 - Ron Mason, Michigan State hockey coach (1979–2002), at age 76 in Haslett, Michigan
- July 2 - Michael Cimino, Academy Award-winning movie director and Michigan State alumnus, at age 77 in California
- July 25 - James M. Nederlander, theatre owner and producer and Detroit native, at age 94 in New York
- August 20 - Harry Gilmer, Detroit Lions quarterback (1955–56), at age 90 in St. Louis
- September 7 - Norbert Schemansky, Gold medalist in weightlifting at 1952 Olympics and Detroit native, at age 92 in Dearborn, Michigan
- September 27 - David Hahn, the "Radioactive Boy Scout", at age 39 in Shelby Charter Township
- October 20 - Gail Cogdill, 3x All-Pro receiver for Detroit Lions (1960–1968), at age 79 in Spokane, Washington
- October 23 - Tom Hayden, political activist and Royal Oak native, at age 76 in California

=== Gallery of 2016 deaths ===
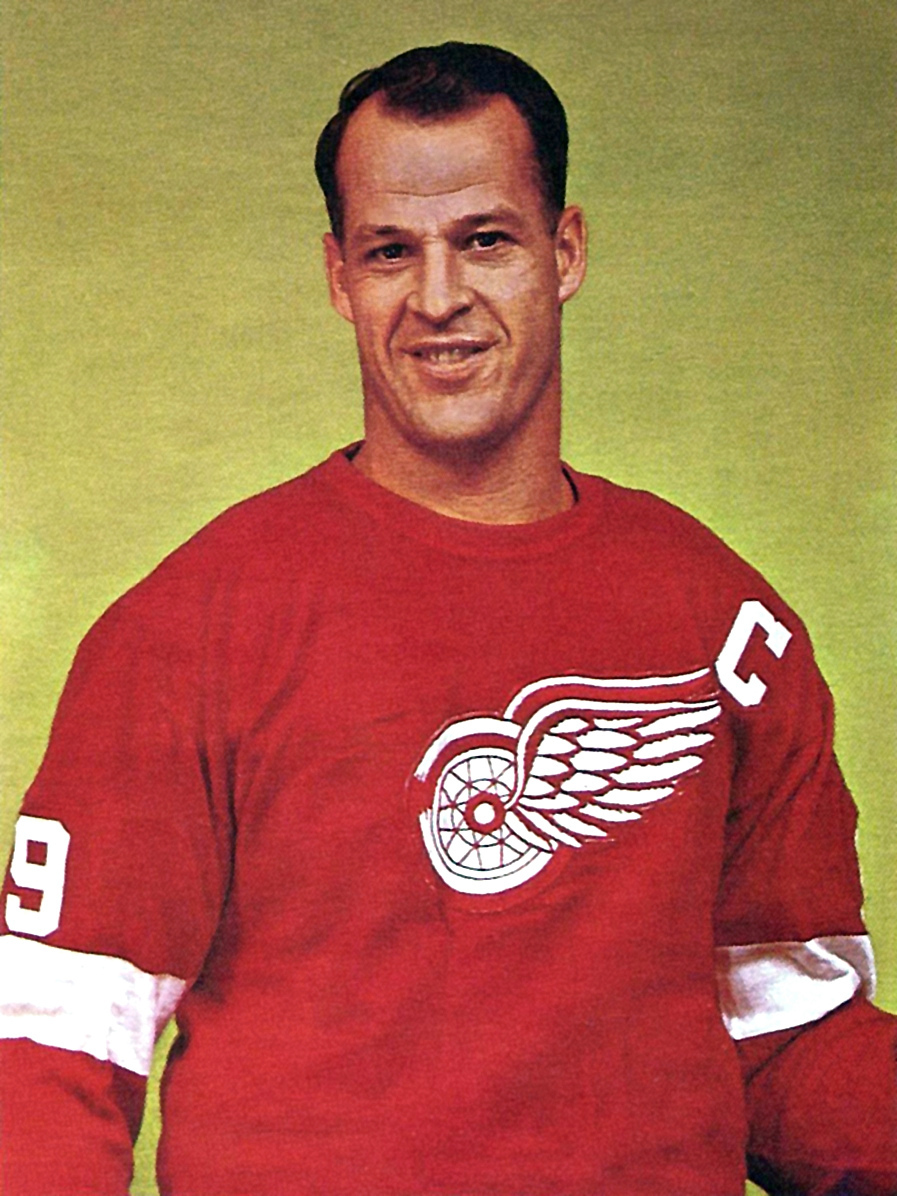
Gordie Howe

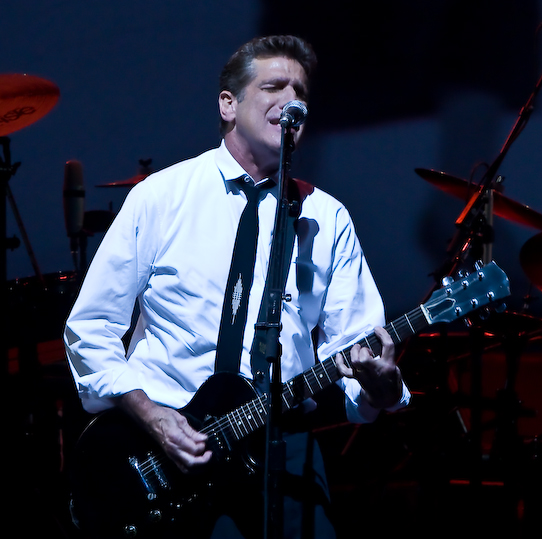
Glenn Frey

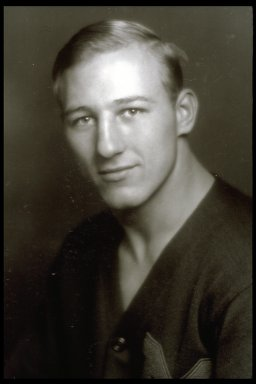
Al Wistert

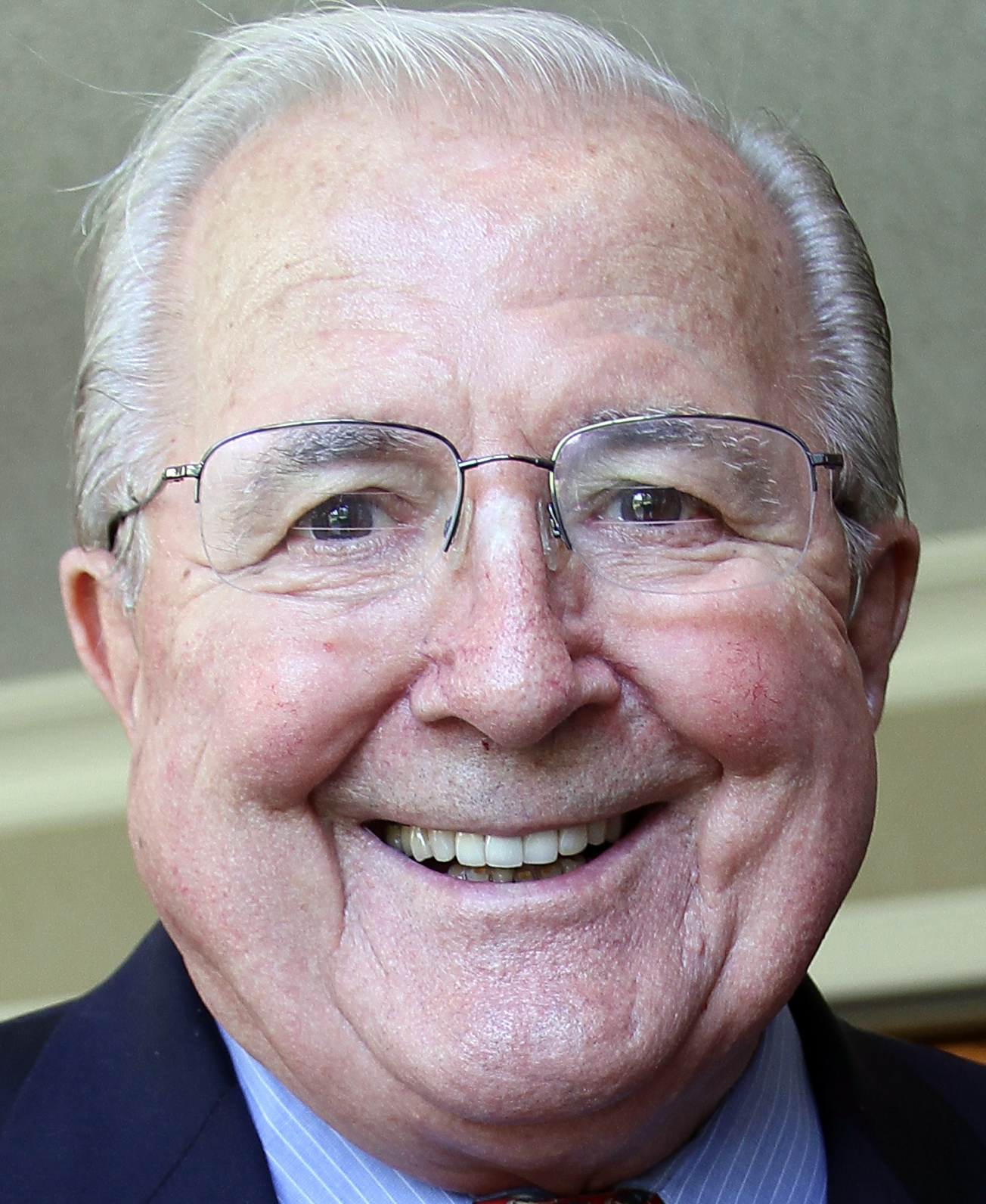
Roman Gribbs

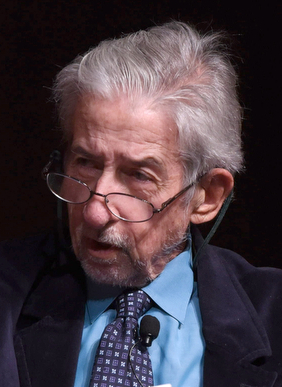
Tom Hayden

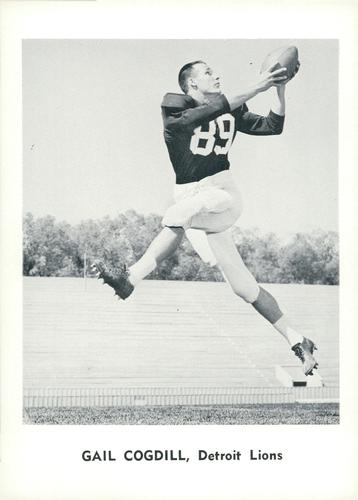
Gail Cogdill

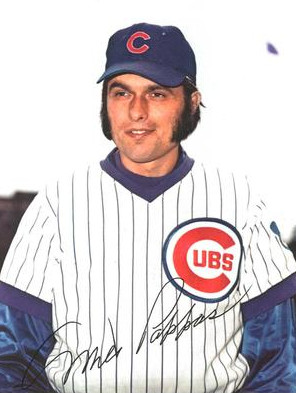
Milt Pappas

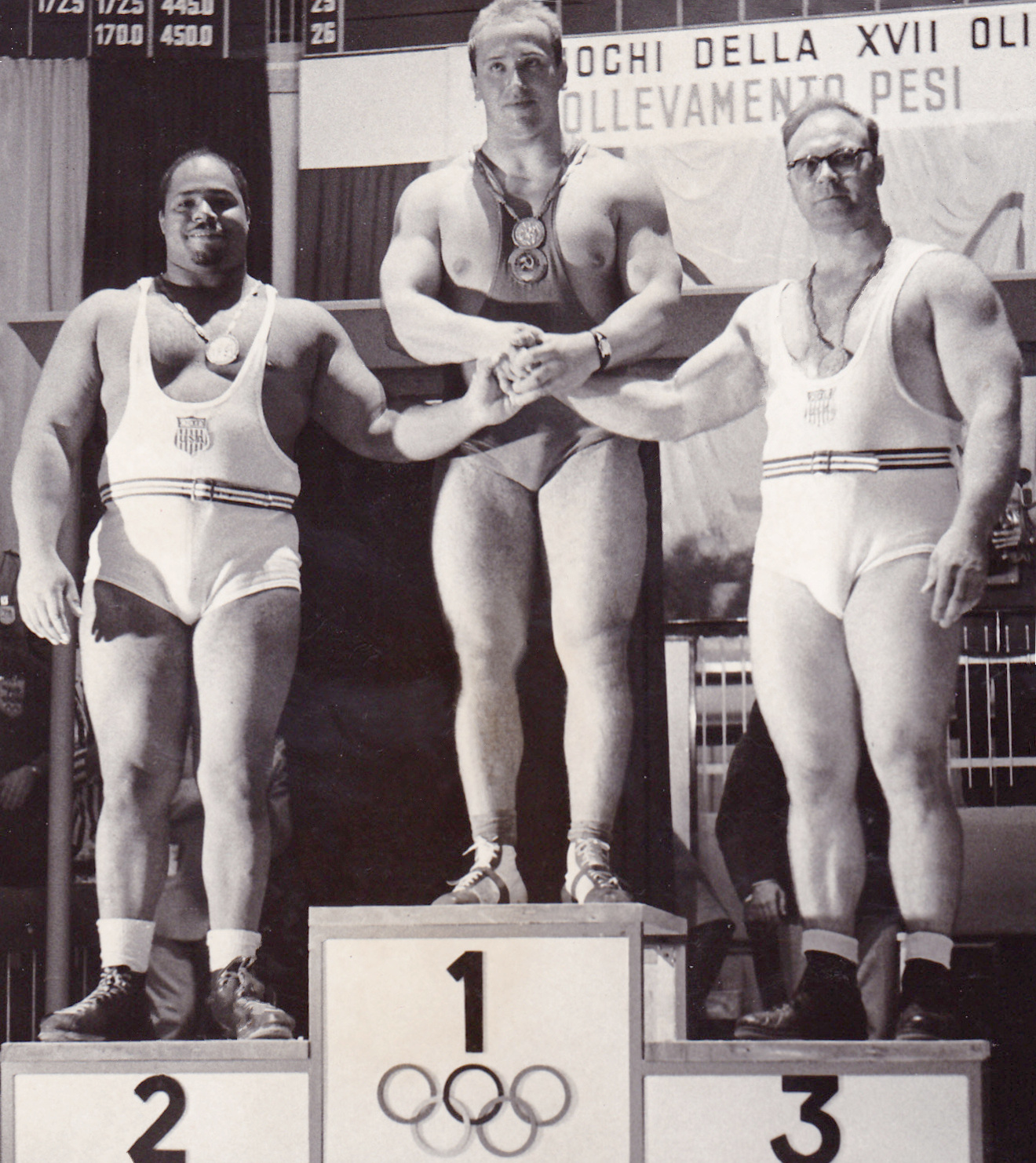
Norbert Schemansky (right)

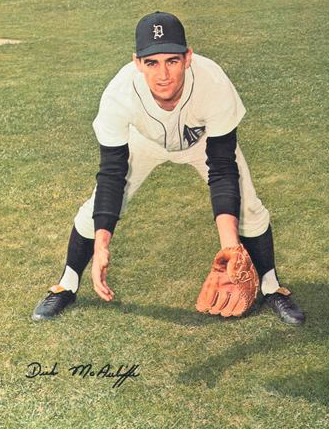
Dick McAuliffe

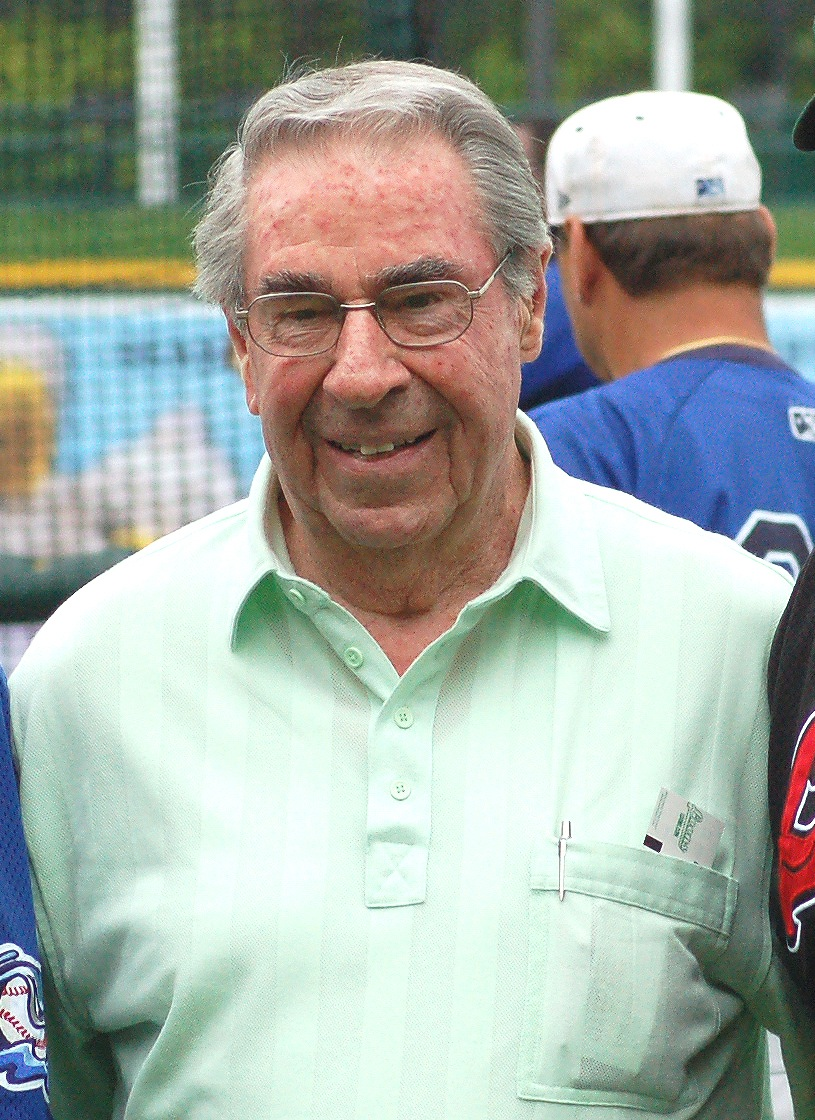
Paul Carey

== See also ==
- History of Michigan
- History of Detroit
