= E. J. (given name) =

The initials E. J. are used by several noted people. This is often an abbreviation for their first and middle names, but can also be used when their first name starts with E, and the 'J' stands for Junior suffix (as in E. J. Junior), or can even be the legal first name. As it is often an abbreviation, it has no actual meaning.

== Notable people with the given name "E. J." ==
=== A ===
- E. J. Alagoa (born 1933), Nigerian academic
- E. J. Altbacker, American screenwriter
- E. J. André (1908–1984), American writer

=== B ===
- E. J. Babille (1883–1970), American film director
- E. J. Barthel (born 1985), American football player
- E. J. Bellocq (1873–1949), American photographer
- E. J. Bibbs (born 1991), American football player
- E. J. Biggers (born 1987), American football player
- E. J. Bonilla (born 1988), American actor
- E. J. Bowen (1898–1980), British chemist
- E. J. Brady (1869–1952), Australian journalist
- E. J. Brooks (born 1985), American mixed martial artist
- E. J. Burt (born 1977), American football player

=== C ===
- E. J. Carroll (1874–1931), Australian entrepreneur
- E. J. Conway (1894–1968), Irish biochemist
- E. J. Cooray (1915–2016), Sri Lankan politician
- E. J. H. Corner (1906–1996), English botanist

=== D ===
- E. J. Davis (disambiguation), multiple people
- E. J. Dawne (1844–1885), American priest
- E. J. Dillon (1854–1933), Irish author
- E. J. Dionne (born 1952), American journalist
- E. J. Drayton (born 1982), American basketball player

=== E ===
- E. J. Ejiya (born 1995), American football player

=== F ===
- E. J. Feihl (born 1970), Filipino basketball player
- E. J. Flanagan (1883–1957), American politician

=== G ===
- E. J. Gaines (born 1992), American football player

=== H ===
- E. J. Harnden (born 1983), Canadian curler
- E. J. Harrison (disambiguation), multiple people
- E. J. Henderson (born 1980), American football player
- E. J. Henneberry (1890–1953), Canadian politician
- E. J. Hill (disambiguation), multiple people
- E. J. Hopple (1881–1941), American politician
- E. J. Hughes (1913–2007), Canadian painter

=== J ===
- E. J. Jenkins (born 1998), American football player
- EJ Johnson (born 1992), American television personality
- EJ Johnson (soccer) (born 2003), American soccer player
- E. J. Jones (born 1962), American football player
- E. J. P. Jorissen (1829–1912), Dutch lawyer and politician
- E. J. Josey (1924–2009), American librarian
- E. J. Junior (born 1959), American football player
- E. J. Justice, American politician

=== K ===
- E. J. Khaile, South African politician
- E. J. Kneen (1867–1947), American politician
- E. J. Koh (born 1988), Korean-American author

=== L ===
- E. J. Miller Laino (1948–2021), American poet
- EJ Laure (born 1997), Filipino volleyball player
- E. J. Lawrence (1877–1947), American football player
- E. J. Lennox (1854–1933), Canadian architect
- E. J. Lenzi, American racing driver
- E. J. Levy, American academic
- E. J. Liddell (born 2000), American basketball player
- E. J. Lonnen (1860–1901), English actor
- E. J. Lowe (disambiguation), multiple people

=== M ===
- EJ Manuel (born 1990), American football player
- E. J. Mather (1887–1928), American football and basketball coach
- E. J. May (1853–1941), English architect
- E. J. McGuire (1952–2011), American ice hockey player
- E. J. Mills (American football), American football coach
- E. J. Milner-Gulland (born 1967), British professor
- E. J. Mishan (1917–2014), English economist
- E. J. Montgomery (born 1999), American basketball player
- E. J. C. Morton (1856–1902), British politician

=== N ===
- E. J. H. Nash (1898–1982), English cleric
- E. J. Nduka (born 1988), American bodybuilder and football player
- E. J. C. Neep (1900–1980), British judge
- E. J. Nemeth (born 1983), American football player

=== O ===
- EJ Onu (born 1999), American basketball player

=== P ===
- E. J. Pay (??–1931), British activist
- E. J. Peaker (born 1942), American actress
- E. J. Pennington (1858–1911), American inventor
- E. J. Perry (artist) (1880–1946), American artist
- E. J. Perry (American football) (born 1998), American football player
- E. J. Pipkin (born 1956), American politician
- E. J. G. Pitman (1897–1993), Australian mathematician
- E. J. Poole-Connor (1872–1962), British preacher
- E. J. Potter (1941–2012), American writer
- E. J. Pratt (1882–1964), Canadian poet

=== R ===
- E. J. Rapson (1861–1937), British philologist
- E. J. Ratcliffe (1863–1948), English actor
- E. J. Rath (1885–1912), American writer
- E. J. Richmond (1825–1918), American author
- E. J. Rowland (born 1983), American basketball player

=== S ===
- E. J. Salcines, American attorney
- E. J. Scovell (1907–1999), English poet
- E. J. Singler (born 1990), American basketball player
- E. J. Smith (American football) (born 2002), American football player
- EJ Snyder (born 1965), American television personality
- E. J. Speed (born 1995), American football player
- E. J. Stewart (1877–1929), American athletic coach
- E. J. Su, Taiwanese-American comic book artist
- E. J. Sullivan (1869–1933), English illustrator

=== T ===
- E. J. Tackett (born 1992), American bowler
- E. J. Thomas, American humanitarian
- E. J. Trivette (born 1936), American racing driver

=== U ===
- E. J. Underwood (born 1983), American football player

=== V ===
- E. J. Viso (born 1985), Venezuelan racing driver

=== W ===
- E. J. Wells, American musician
- E. J. Westlake (born 1965), American playwright
- E. J. White, American professor
- E. J. Whitley (born 1982), American football player
- E. J. Williams (1918–2021), Canadian politician
- E.J. Williams Jr. (born 2001), American football player
- E. J. Wilson (born 1987), American football player
- E. J. Woods (1839–1916), Australian architect
- E. J. Workman (1899–1982), American physicist

== Fictional characters ==
- EJ DiMera, a character on the American soap opera Days of Our Lives

== See also ==
- EJ (disambiguation), a disambiguation page for "EJ"
