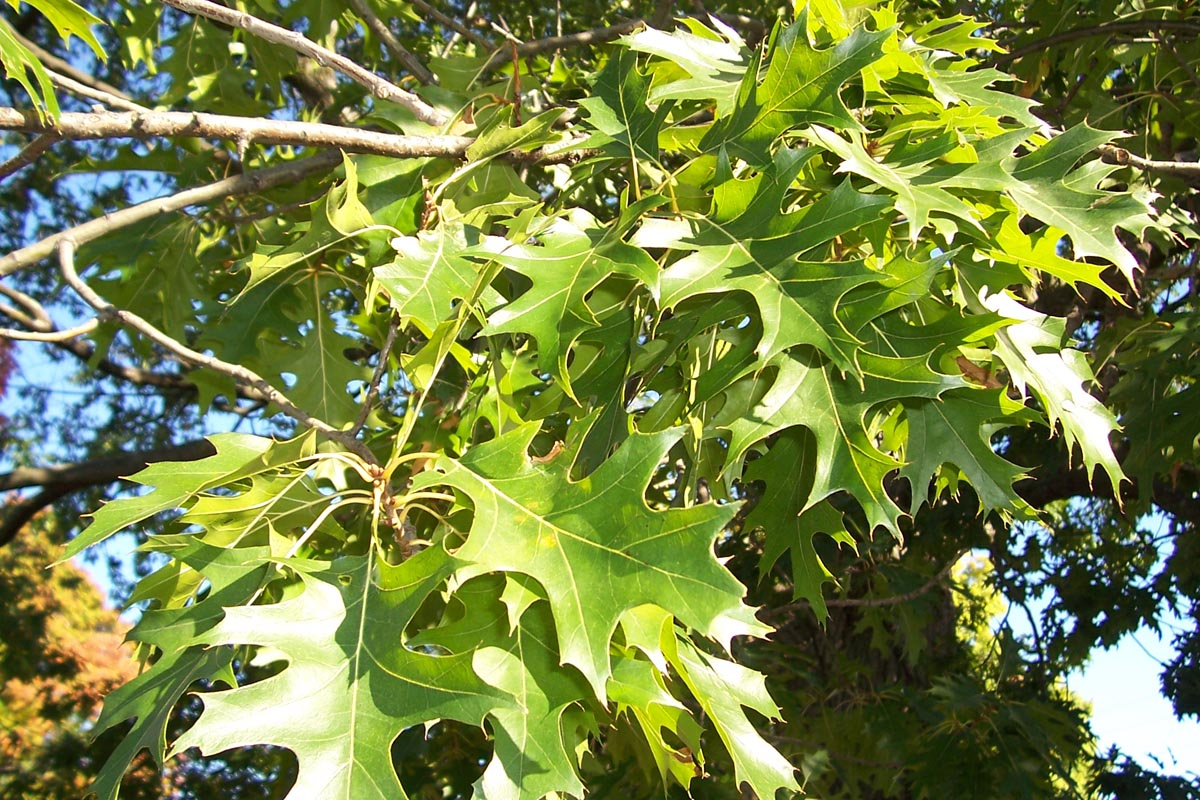

Conservation status
- Least Concern (IUCN 3.1)

- Secure (NatureServe)

Scientific classification
- Kingdom: Plantae
- Clade: Embryophytes
- Clade: Tracheophytes
- Clade: Angiosperms
- Clade: Eudicots
- Clade: Rosids
- Order: Fagales
- Family: Fagaceae
- Genus: Quercus
- Subgenus: Quercus subg. Quercus
- Section: Quercus sect. Lobatae
- Species: Q. ellipsoidalis

Binomial name
- Quercus ellipsoidalis E.J.Hill
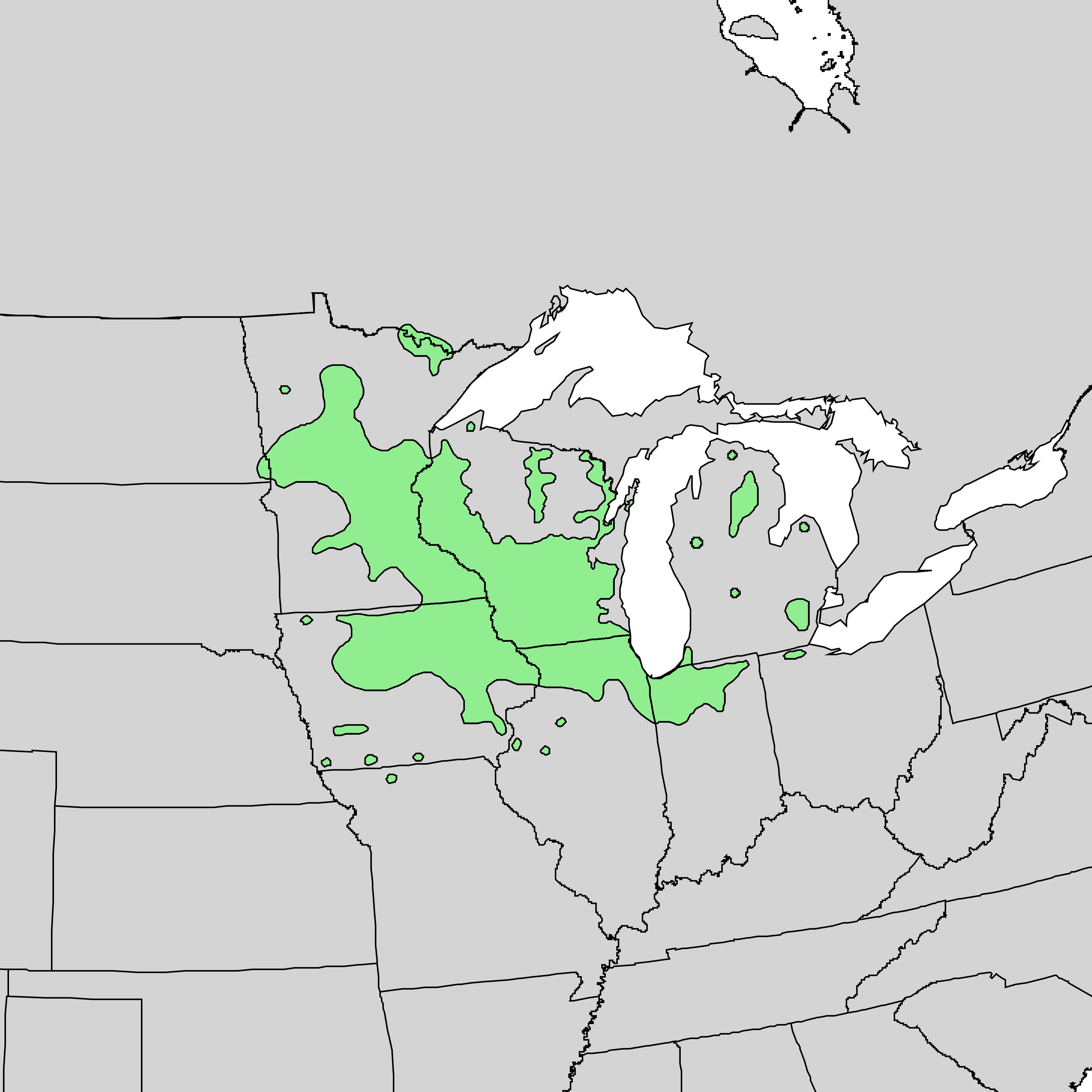
- Natural range (in the US)

= Quercus ellipsoidalis =

Northern pin oak

Species of oak tree

Quercus ellipsoidalis, the northern pin oak or Hill's oak, is a North American species of oak tree native to the north-central United States and south-central Canada, primarily in the Great Lakes region and the Upper Mississippi Valley. It most commonly occurs on dry, sandy soils.

== Description ==
Quercus ellipsoidalis is a medium-sized deciduous tree growing to 20 meters (66 feet) tall with an open, rounded crown. The leaves are glossy green, 7–13 centimeters (2 3/4–5 inches) long and 5–10 cm (2–4 in) broad, lobed, with five or seven lobes, and deep sinuses between the lobes. Each lobe has 3–7 bristle-tipped teeth. The leaf is nearly hairless, except for small tufts of pale orange-brown down where the lobe veins join the central vein. The acorns tend to be ellipsoid (ellipse-shaped, from which its scientific name derives), though they tend to be highly variable and range to globose, 6–11 millimeters (1/4–7/16 in) long and 10–19 mm (13/32–3/4 in) broad, a third to a half covered in a deep cup, green maturing pale brown about 18 months after pollination; the kernel is very bitter. The inner surface of the acorn cap is glabrous (hairless) to sparsely or moderately pubescent, and the hairs if present tend to be kinky rather than straight.

== Taxonomy ==
Although the common name suggests a resemblance to the pin oak (Q. palustris), Q. ellipsoidalis has traditionally been thought to be closely related to the scarlet oak (Q. coccinea), and was in fact included in that species by many botanists. Recent work suggests that there is more gene flow between Hill's oak and black oak (Q. velutina), but the phylogenetic position of these species is still uncertain. The morphological similarity between Q. ellipsoidalis and Q. coccinea remains a source of confusion, especially in northwestern Indiana and southern Cook County, Illinois.

== Uses ==
Northern pin oak is planted as an ornamental tree, popular for its bright red fall color and tolerance of infertile sandy soils. The wood is used for fence posts, fuel and general construction. The cultivar 'Hemelrijk' has gained the Royal Horticultural Society's Award of Garden Merit.
