= Ejay (disambiguation) =

eJay is a series of musical arrangement software and video games.

Ejay may also refer to:

== People ==
- EJay Day (Earl Day; born 1981), American singer and songwriter
- Ejay Falcon (born 1989), Filipino actor and politician

== Places ==
- EJAY Theatre, one of the former names of Crystal Theatre, a historic theater and performing arts center in Crystal Falls, Michigan, USA

== See also ==
- EJ (disambiguation)
