= EJ =

EJ may refer to:

== Businesses and brands ==
- EJ (company), formerly East Jordan Iron Works
- eJay, a music software program
- New England Airlines (IATA code EJ)
- E & J Gallo Winery
- Holden EJ, an early Holden car
- Subaru EJ engine series, manufactured by Subaru

== Media ==
- Encyclopaedia Judaica
- The Economic Journal, the journal of the Royal Economic Society
- Edmonton Journal
- English Journal, the official publication of the Secondary Education section of the American National Council of Teachers of English

== Other uses ==
- East Jerusalem
- Electronic journalism, an old name for electronic news gathering
- Electro jockey, an individual who uses computers and MIDI devices to mix music as opposed to using records or CDs
- Elton John, a British singer-songwriter and pianist
- Environmental justice
- Exajoule (EJ), an SI unit of energy equal to 10^{18} joules
- External jugular vein
- Expansion joint, in architecture and structural mechanics
- E. J. (given name), a page for people with the given name "E. J."

== See also ==
- Ejay (disambiguation)
