= 2012 in Michigan =

- Decades: 1990s; 2000s; 2010s; 2020s
- See also: History of Michigan; Historical outline of Michigan; List of years in Michigan; 2012 in the United States

Events from the year 2012 in Michigan.

== Office holders ==
=== State office holders ===
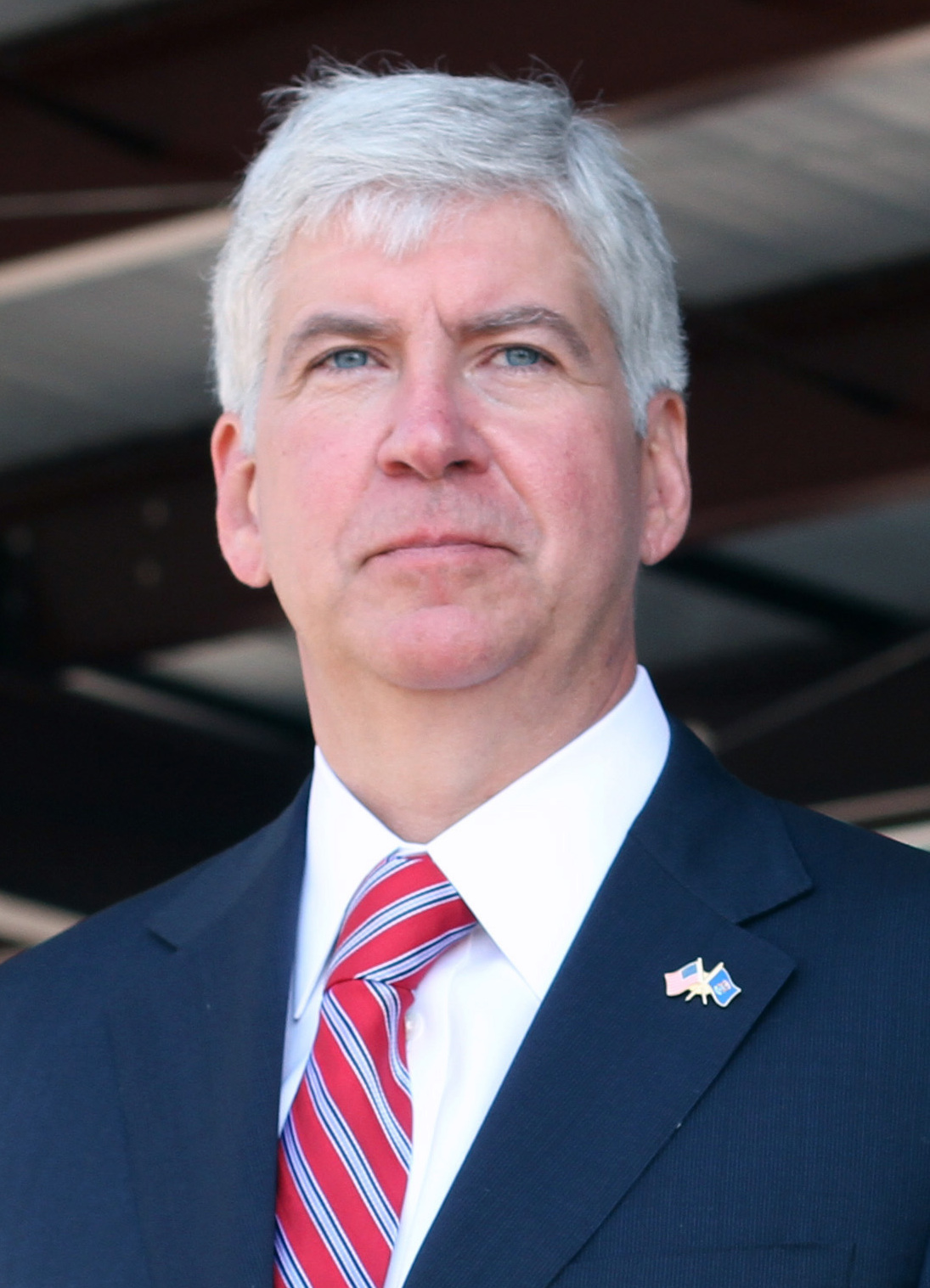
Rick Snyder

- Governor of Michigan: Rick Snyder (Republican)
- Lieutenant Governor of Michigan: Brian Calley (Republican)
- Michigan Attorney General: Bill Schuette (Republican)
- Michigan Secretary of State: Ruth Johnson (Republican)
- Speaker of the Michigan House of Representatives: Jase Bolger (Republican)
- Majority Leader of the Michigan Senate: Randy Richardville (Republican)
- Chief Justice, Michigan Supreme Court: Robert P. Young Jr.

=== Mayors of major cities ===
- Mayor of Detroit: Dave Bing (Democrat)
- Mayor of Grand Rapids: George Heartwell
- Mayor of Warren, Michigan: James R. Fouts
- Mayor of Sterling Heights, Michigan: Richard J. Notte
- Mayor of Ann Arbor: John Hieftje (Democrat)
- Mayor of Dearborn: John B. O'Reilly Jr.
- Mayor of Lansing: Virgil Bernero
- Mayor of Flint: Dayne Walling
- Mayor of Saginaw: Greg Branch

=== Federal office holders ===
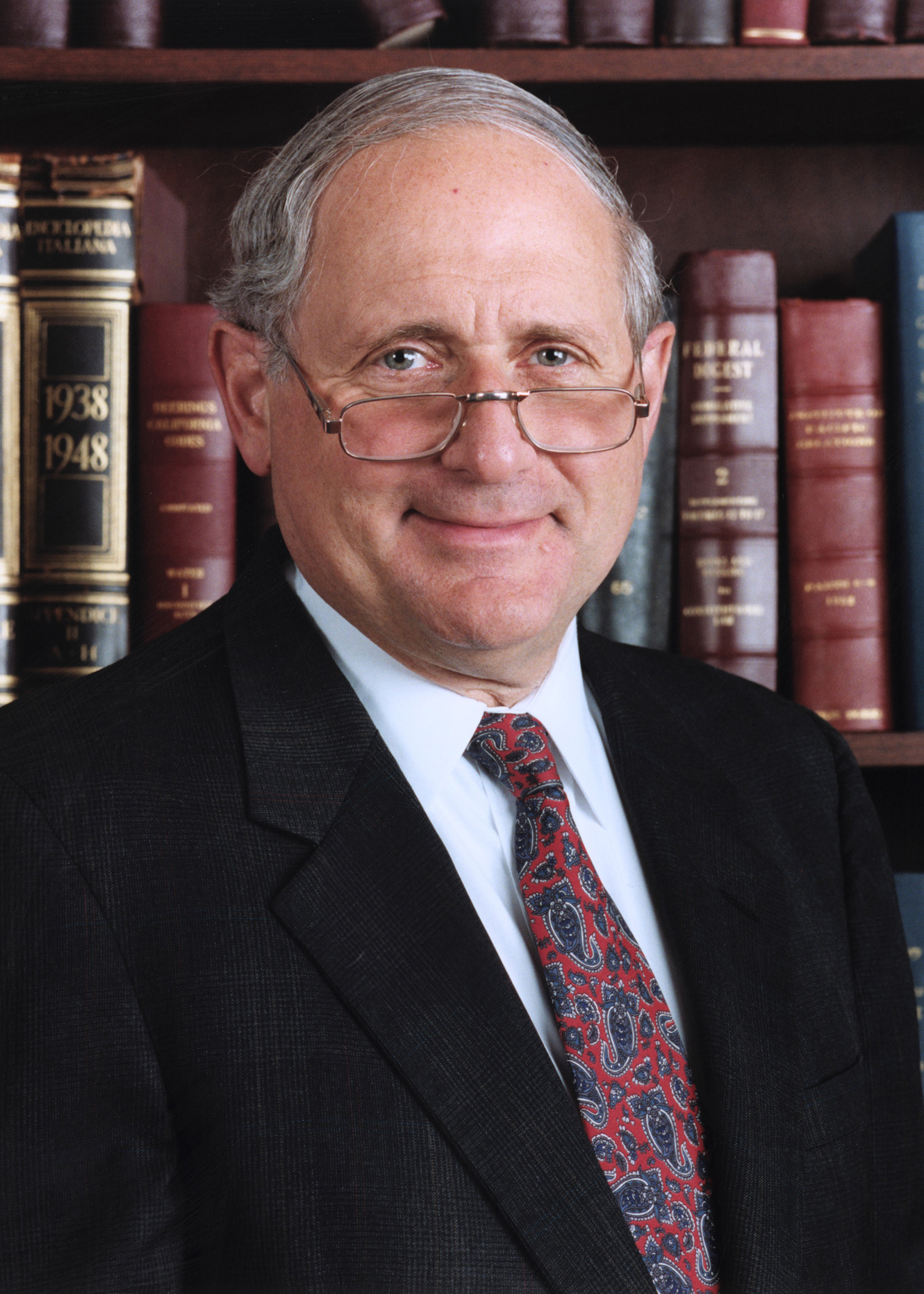
Carl Levin

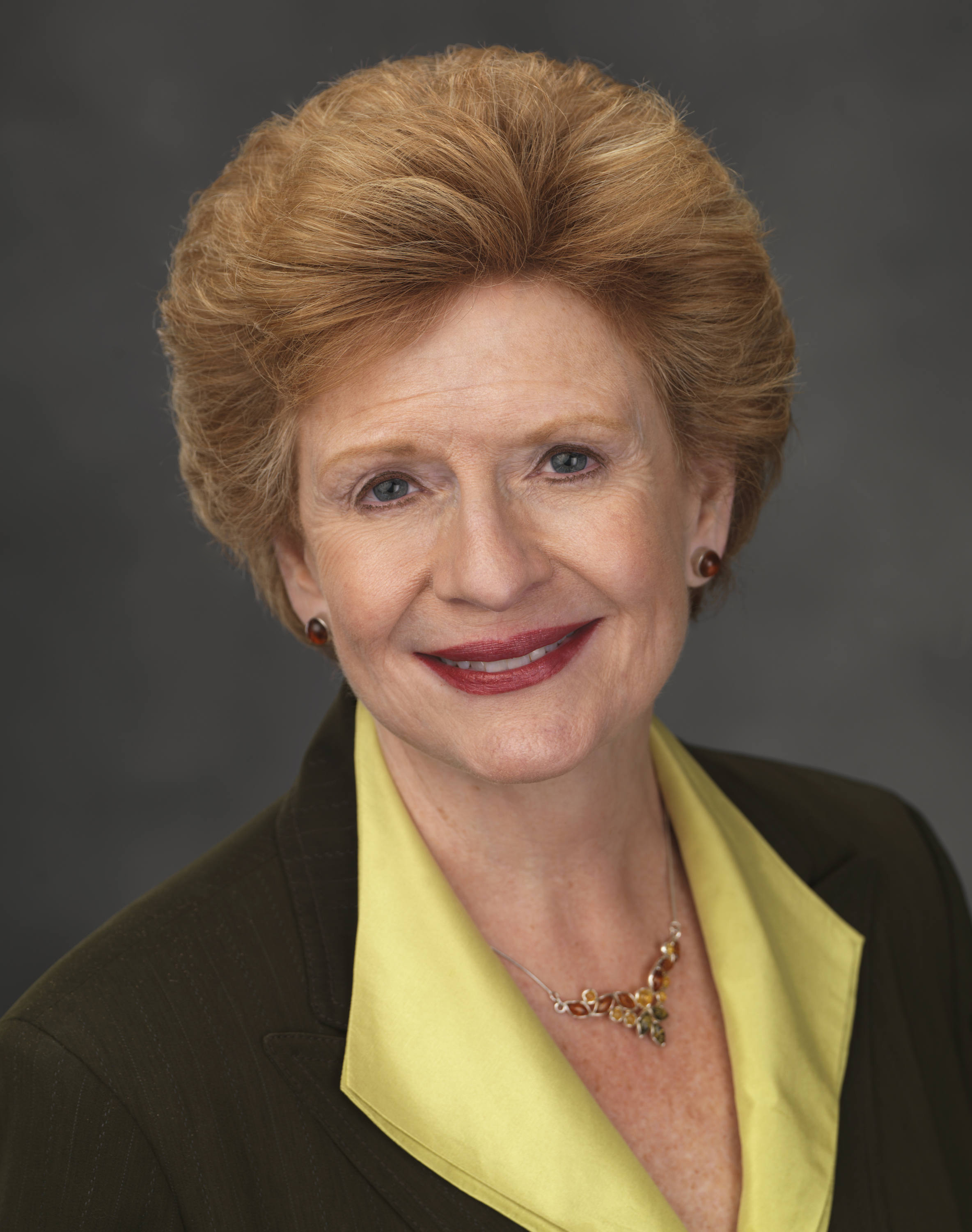
Debbie Stabenow

- U.S. Senator from Michigan: Debbie Stabenow (Democrat)
- U.S. Senator from Michigan: Carl Levin (Democrat)
- House District 1: Dan Benishek (Republican)
- House District 2: Bill Huizenga (Republican)
- House District 3: Justin Amash (Republican)
- House District 4: Dave Camp (Republican)
- House District 5: Dale Kildee (Democrat)
- House District 6: Fred Upton (Republican)
- House District 7: Tim Walberg (Republican)
- House District 8: Mike Rogers (Republican)
- House District 9: Sander Levin (Democrat)
- House District 10: Candice Miller (Republican)
- House District 11: David Curson (Democrat)
- House District 12: John Dingell (Democrat)
- House District 13: John Conyers (Democrat)
- House District 14: Gary Peters (Democrat)

== Population ==
In the 2010 United States Census, Michigan was recorded as having a population of 9,883,640 persons, ranking as the eighth most populous state in the country.

The state's largest cities, having populations of at least 75,000 based on 2016 estimates, were as follows:

2017 Rank	City	County	2010 Pop.	2016 Pop.	Change 2010-16
1	Detroit	Wayne	713,777	672,795	−5.7% ▼
2	Grand Rapids	Kent	188,040	196,445	4.5% ▲
3	Warren	Macomb	134,056	135,125	0.8% ▲
4	Sterling Heights	Macomb	129,699	132,427	2.1% ▲
5	Ann Arbor	Washtenaw	113,934	120,782	6.0% ▲
6	Lansing	Ingham	114,297	116,020	1.5% ▲
7	Flint	Genesee	102,434	97,386	−4.9% ▼
8	Dearborn	Wayne	98,153	94,444	−3.8% ▼
9	Livonia	Wayne	96,942	94,041	−3.0% ▼
10	Troy	Oakland	80,980	83,641	3.3% ▲
11	Westland	Wayne	84,094	81,545	−3.0% ▼
12	Farmington Hills	Oakland	79,740	81,129	1.7% ▲
13	Kalamazoo	Kalamazoo	74,262	75,984	2.3% ▲
14	Wyoming	Kent	72,125	75,567	4.8% ▲

== Sports ==
=== Baseball ===
- 2012 Detroit Tigers season – Under manager Jim Leyland, the Tigers compiled an 88-74 record, finished first in the American League Central, defeated Oakland in the divisional series and the Yankees in the American League Championship Series, and lost to the San Francisco Giants in the 2012 World Series. The team's statistical leaders included Miguel Cabrera with a .330 batting average, 44 home runs, and 139 RBIs, Justin Verlander with 17 wins, and Brayan Villarreal with a 2.63 earned run average
- 2012 Michigan Wolverines baseball team -
- 2012 Michigan Wolverines softball team -

=== American football ===
- 2012 Detroit Lions season – Under coach Jim Schwartz, the Lions compiles a 4-12 record. The team's statistical leaders included Matthew Stafford with 4,967 passing yards, Mikel Leshoure with 798 rushing yards, Calvin Johnson with 1,964 receiving yards, and Jason Hanson with 134 points scored.
- 2012 Michigan State Spartans football team - Under head coach Mark Dantonio, the Spartans compiled a 7-6 record. The team's statistical leaders included Andrew Maxwell with 2,606 passing yards, Le'Veon Bell with 1,793 rushing yards, Bennie Fowler with 524 receiving yards, and Dan Conroy with 94 points scored.
- 2012 Michigan Wolverines football team - Under head coach Brady Hoke, the Wolverines compiled an 8-5 record. The team's statistical leaders included Denard Robinson with 1,319 passing yards and 1,266 rushing yards, Jeremy Gallon with 829 receiving yards, and Brendan Gibbons with 93 points scored.
- 2012 Western Michigan Broncos football team - Under head coach Bill Cubit, the Broncos compiled a 4–8 record.
- 2012 Central Michigan Chippewas football team - Under head coach Dan Enos, the Chippewas compiled a 7–6 record.
- 2012 Eastern Michigan Eagles football team - Under head coach Ron English, the Eagles compiled a 2–10 record.

=== Basketball ===
- 2011–12 Detroit Pistons season – Under coach Lawrence Frank, the Pistons compiled a 25-41 record. The team's statistical leaders included Greg Monroe with 1,015 points scored and 637 rebounds and Brandon Knight with 251 assists.
- 2011–12 Michigan State Spartans men's basketball team - Under head coach Tom Izzo, the Spartans compiled a 29-8. The team's statistical leaders included Draymond Green with 601 points and 394 rebounds and Keith Appling with 144 assists.
- 2011–12 Michigan Wolverines men's basketball team - Under head coach John Beilein, the Wolverines compiled a 24-10 record. The team's statistical leaders included Trey Burke with 504 points and 156 assists and Jordan Morgan with 191 rebounds.
- 2011–12 Detroit Titans men's basketball team - Under head coach Ray McCallum, the team compiled a 22–14 record.
- 2011–12 Michigan State Spartans women's basketball team -
- 2011–12 Michigan Wolverines women's basketball team -

=== Ice hockey ===
- 2011–12 Detroit Red Wings season – Under head coach Mike Babcock, the Red Wings compiled a 48-28-6 record and lost to Nashville in the conference quarterfinals. The team's statistical leaders included Henrik Zetterberg with 69 points scored, Johan Franzen with 29 goals, and Pavel Datsyuk with 48 assists.
- 2011–12 Michigan Wolverines men's ice hockey team - In their 26th season under head coach Red Berenson, the Wolverines compiled a 24–13–4 record.
- 2011–12 Michigan State Spartans men's ice hockey team - Under head coach Tom Anastos, the Spartans compiled a 20–16–4 record.

=== Racing ===
- Port Huron to Mackinac Boat Race -
- Pure Michigan 400 -
- Detroit Grand Prix -

=== Other ===
- Michigan Open -

== Chronology of events ==
=== November ===
- November 6 – A number of elections occurred, including:
  - President of the United States - Incumbent President Barack Obama wins Michigan over Republican nominee Mitt Romney, with 54% of the vote.
  - United States Senate - Incumbent U. S. Senator Debbie Stabenow defeats Republican nominee Pete Hoekstra with 58% of the vote.
  - United States House of Representatives - Redistricting leaves Michigan with one less congressional district, with no congressional districts switching parties, leaving the Michigan's U.S. House delegation at 9 Republicans and 4 Democrats.
  - Michigan House of Representatives - The Michigan House of Representatives has its partisan make up changed from 63 Republicans and 47 Democrats to 59 Republicans and 51 Democrats.
  - State Ballot Proposals - Out of six state ballot proposals, none are adopted.

== Deaths ==
- February 19 - Vito Giacalone, organized crime figure, at age 78
- April 7 - Mike Wallace, journalist and University of Michigan alumnus, at age 93 in Connecticut
- April 30 - E. J. Potter, dragstrip proponent known as the "Michigan Madman", at age 61 in Ithaca, Michigan
- May 24 - George Ceithaml, Michigan quarterback 1941-42, at age 91 in California
- May 31 - Orlando Woolridge, played for Detroit Pistons (1991–1993), at age 52 in Louisiana
- June 14 - Bob Chappuis, University of Michigan football player finished second in 1947 Heisman voting, inducted into College Football Hall of Fame, at age 89 in Ann Arbor
- July 16 - James F. Goodrich, Under Secretary of the Navy (1981-1987) and native of Jackson, at age 99 in Maine
- July 24 - Chad Everett, actor and Dearborn native, at age 75 in Los Angeles
- August 8 - Fay Ajzenberg-Selove, physicist and Michigan alumnus who won 2007 National Medal of Science, at age 86 in Pennsylvania
- August 29 - Les Moss, manager of Detroit Tigers in 1979 prior to hiring of Sparky Anderson, at age 87 in Florida
- August 31 - Tom Keating, MVP of 1963 Michigan football team, at age 69 in Denver
- September 30 - Clara Stanton Jones, first African-American director of a major city public library, Detroit (1970–1978), at age 99 in California
- October 9 - Budd Lynch, play-by-play broadcaster and later public address announcer for Detroit Red Wings for more than 60 years starting in 1949, at age 95 in Dearborn, Michigan
- October 10 - Alex Karras, football player for Detroit Lions (1958–1970) and actor, inducted into Pro Football Hall of Fame, at age 77 in Los Angeles
- October 11 - Champ Summers, OF/DH for Detroit Tigers (1979–1981), at age 66 in Florida
- October 16 - Eddie Yost, third baseman for Detroit Tigers (1959–1960), at age 86 in Massachusetts
- October 25 - Emanuel Steward, boxing trainer associated with Kronk Gym, at age 68 in Chicago
- November 2 - Joe Ginsberg, catcher for Detroit Tigers (1948, 1950–1953), at age 86 in West Bloomfield, Michigan
- November 5 - Stalking Cat, Flint native known for extreme body modifications to resemble a tigress, at age 54 in Nevada
- November 16 - Helen Milliken, First Lady of Michigan (1969–1983) and women's rights activist, at age 89 in Traverse City
- November 22 - Bennie McRae, football and track star at Michigan, ranked one of the Chicago Bears greatest players, at age 72 in Maryland
- November 29 - Merv Pregulman, All-American player for Michigan in 1943, at age 90 in Tennessee
- December 12 - Eddie "Guitar" Burns, blues musician, at age 84

=== Gallery of 2012 deaths ===
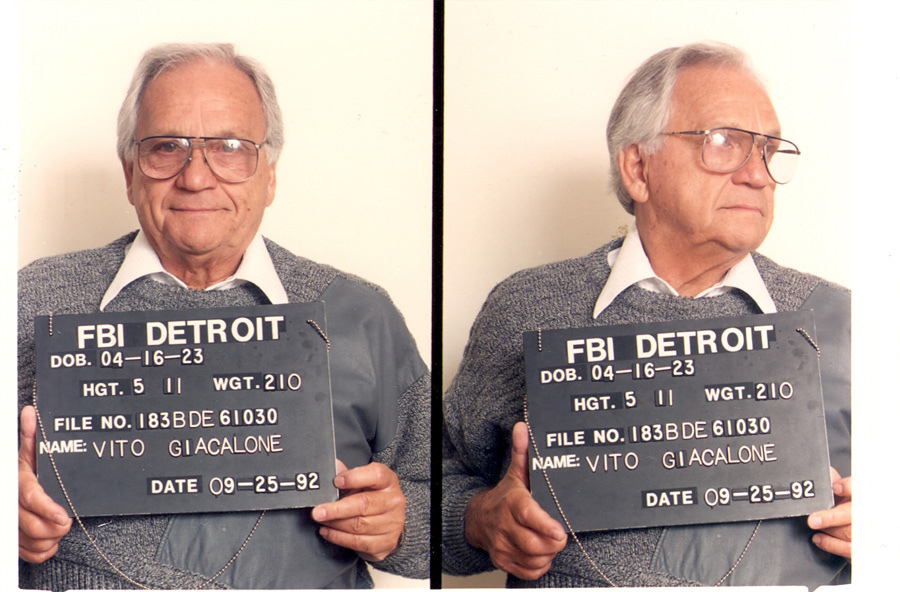
Vito Giacalone

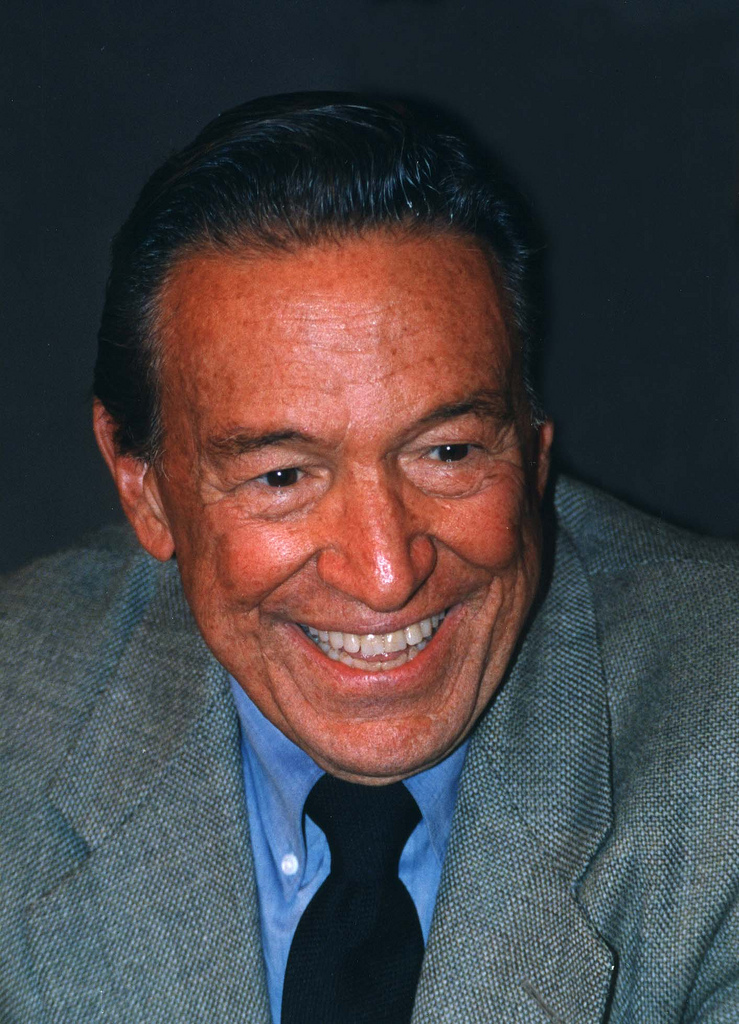
Mike Wallace

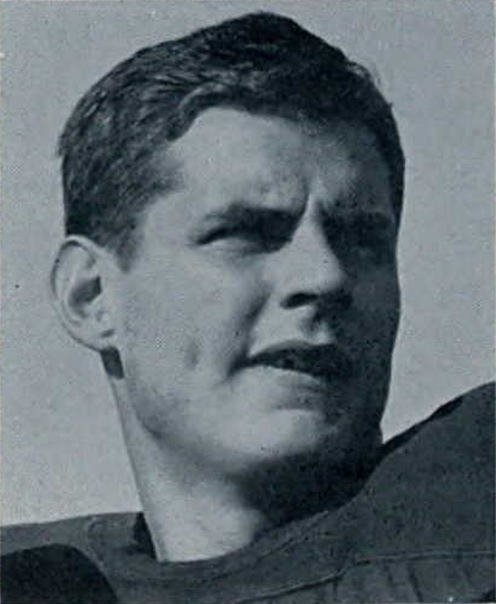
Bob Chappuis

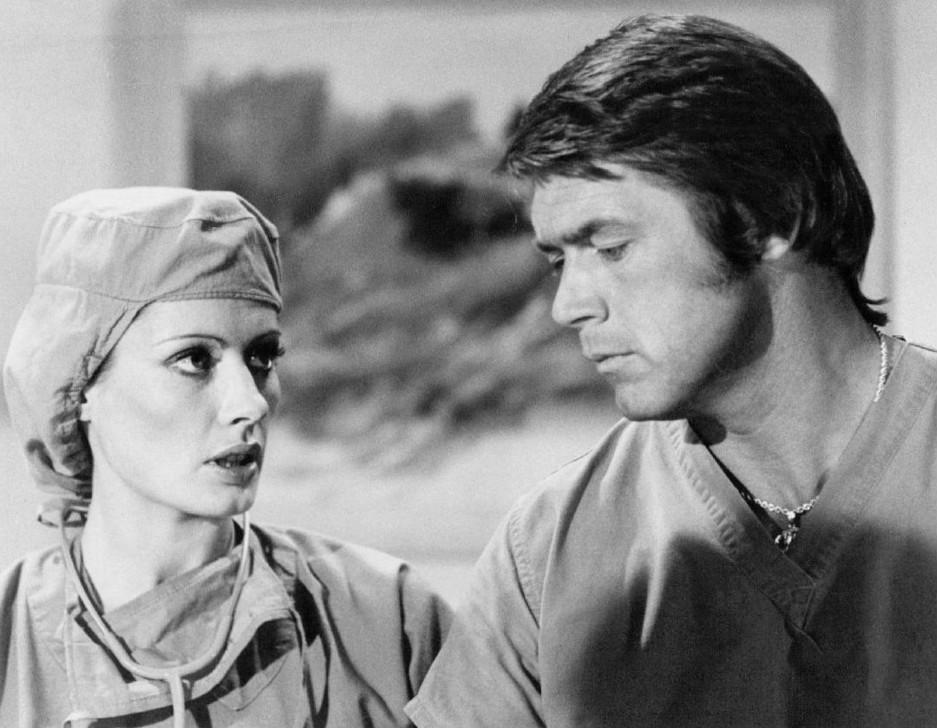
Chad Everett

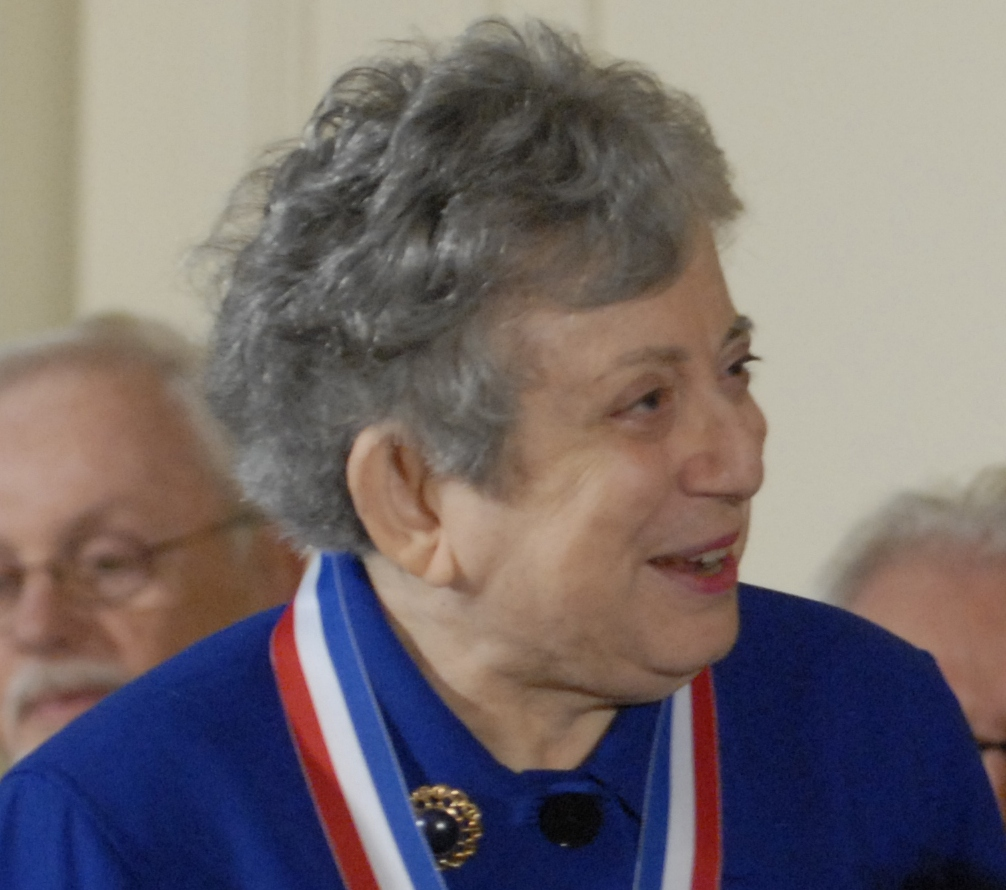
Fay Ajzenberg-Selove

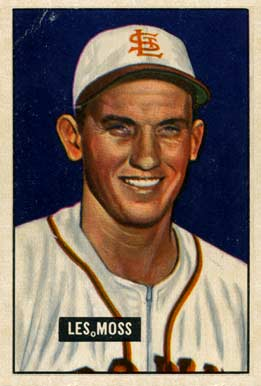
Les Moss

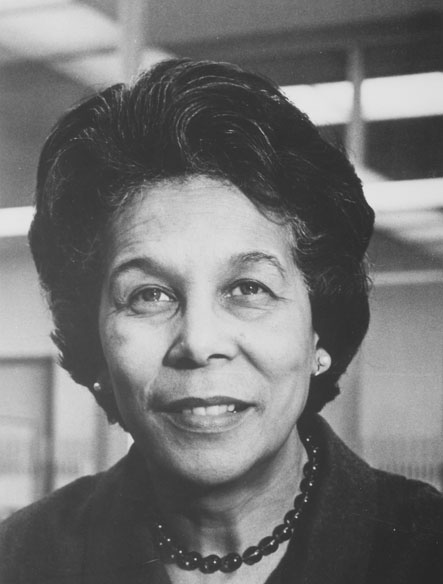
Clara Stanton Jones

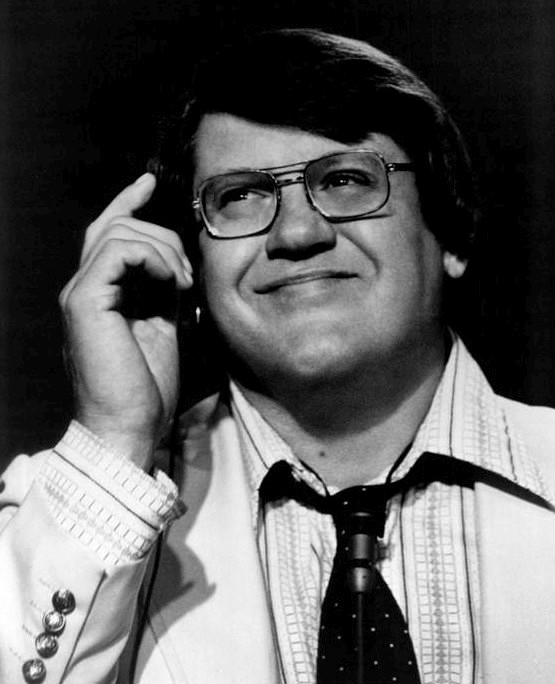
Alex Karras

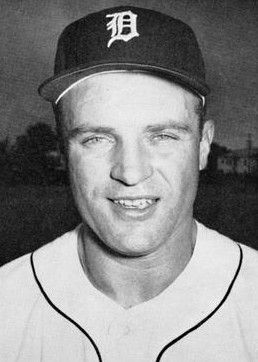
Eddie Yost

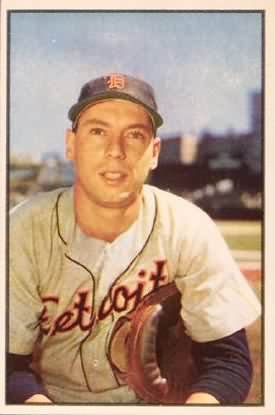
Joe Ginsberg

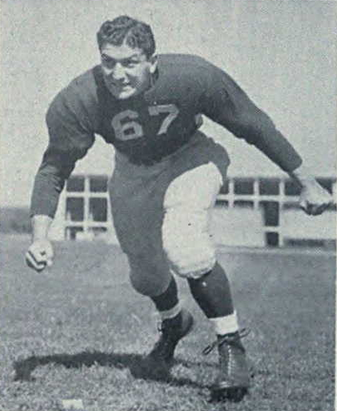
Merv Pregulman

== See also ==
- History of Michigan
- History of Detroit
