= Senator Flanagan (disambiguation) =

James W. Flanagan (1805–1887) was a U.S. Senator from Texas from 1870 to 1875. Senator Flanagan may also refer to:

- E. J. Flanagan (1883–1957), Washington State Senate
- Ed Flanagan (politician) (1950–2017), Vermont State Senator
- Jennifer Flanagan, Massachusetts State Senate
- John J. Flanagan (born 1961), New York State Senate
- Peggy Flanagan (born 1979), U.S. Senate-elect from Minnesota
- Webster Flanagan (1832–1924), Texas State Senate
