= E. J. Hill =

E. J. Hill may refer to:

- EJ Hill (born 1985), American artist
- Ellsworth Jerome Hill (1833–1917), an American botanist active in the Chicago region whose standard author abbreviation is E.J.Hill
- Ernest Joseph Hill (1985-), known as EJ Hill, a contemporary American artist from Los Angeles
