= 2014 in Michigan =

- Decades: 1990s; 2000s; 2010s; 2020s
- See also: History of Michigan; Historical outline of Michigan; List of years in Michigan; 2014 in the United States

Events from the year 2014 in Michigan.

== Office holders ==
=== State office holders ===
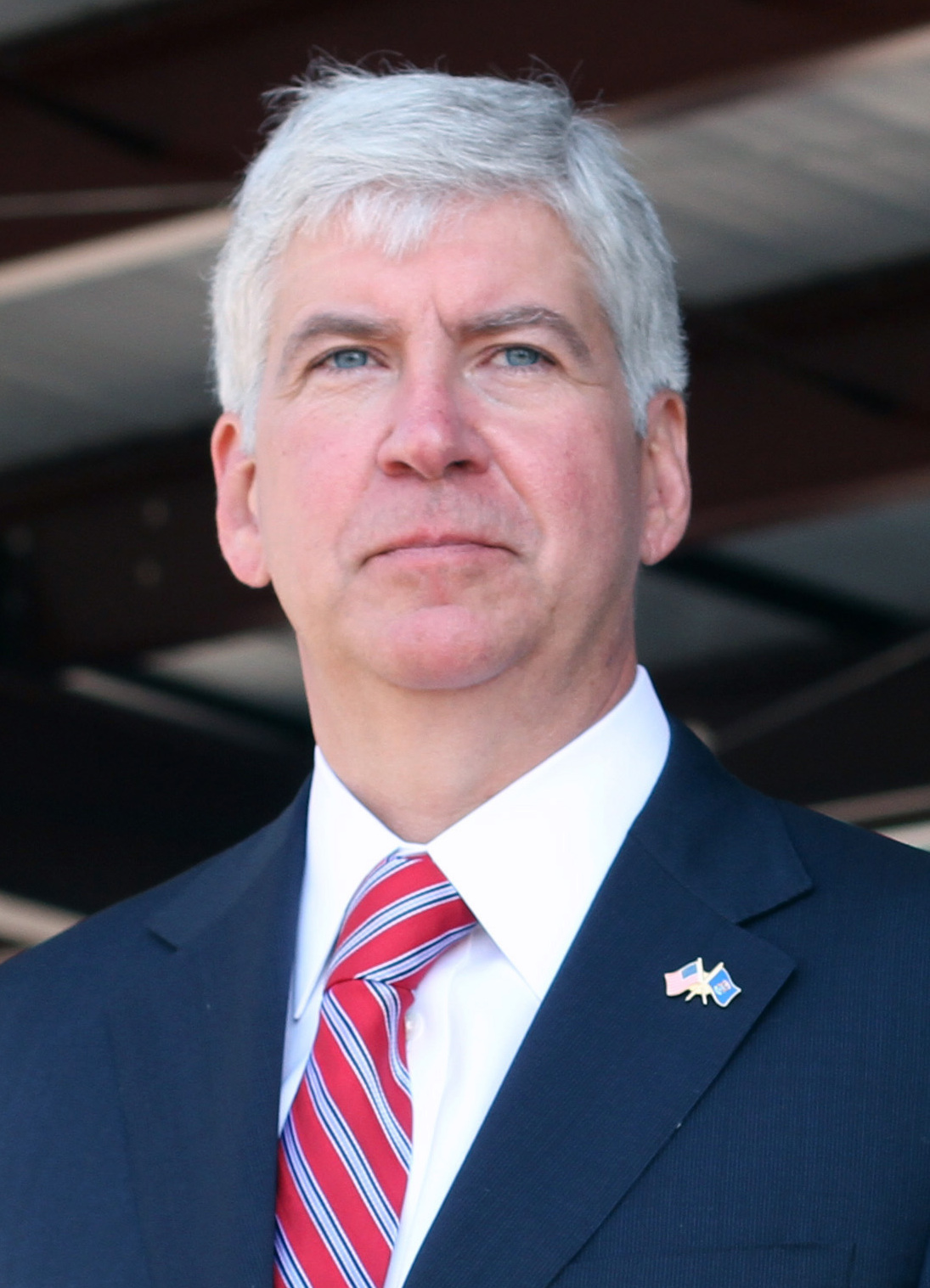
Rick Snyder

- Governor of Michigan: Rick Snyder (Republican)
- Lieutenant Governor of Michigan: Brian Calley (Republican)
- Michigan Attorney General: Bill Schuette (Republican)
- Michigan Secretary of State: Ruth Johnson (Republican)
- Speaker of the Michigan House of Representatives: Jase Bolger (Republican)
- Majority Leader of the Michigan Senate: Randy Richardville (Republican)
- Chief Justice, Michigan Supreme Court: Robert P. Young Jr.

=== Mayors of major cities ===
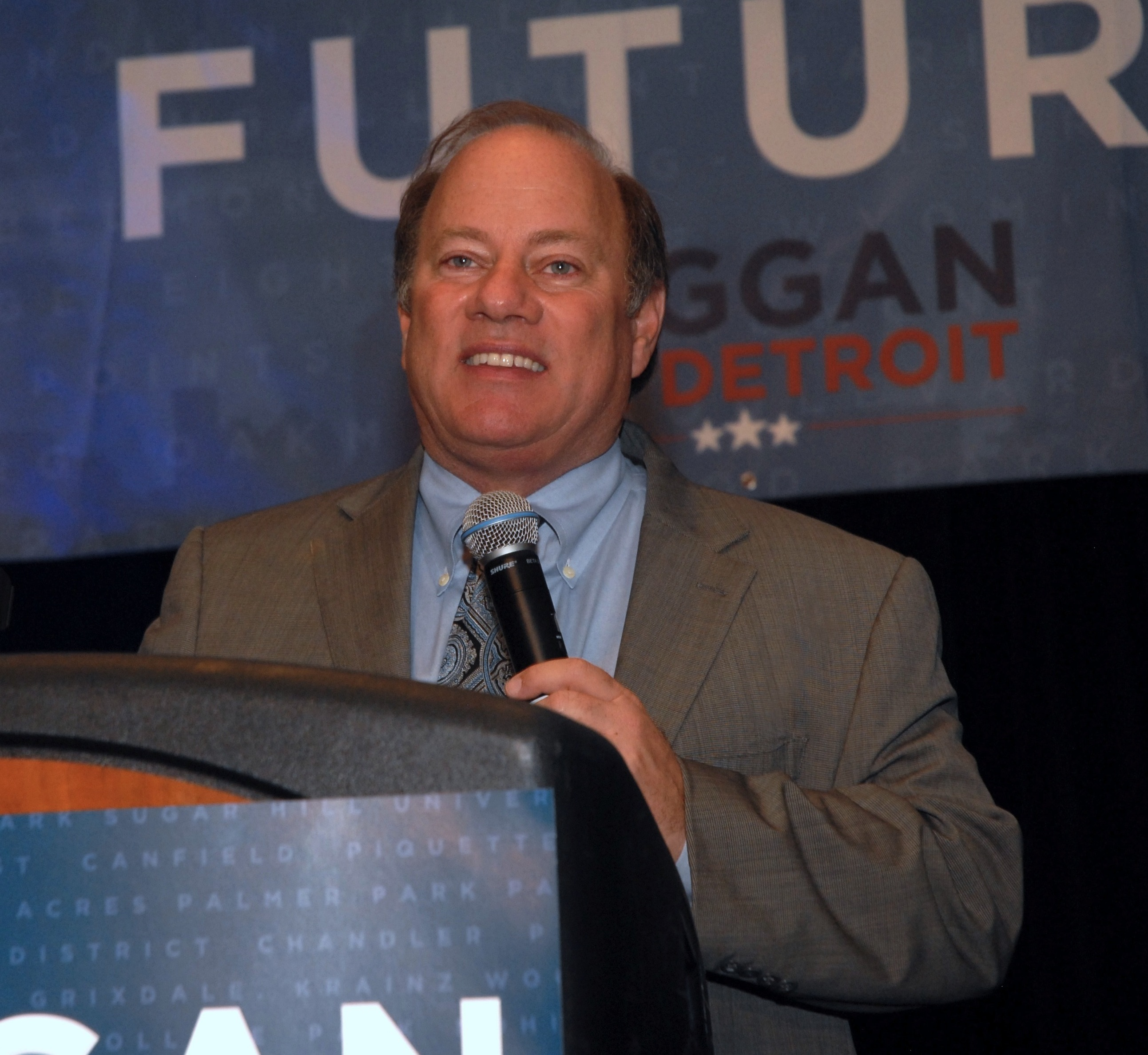
Mike Duggan

- Mayor of Detroit: Mike Duggan (Democrat)
- Mayor of Grand Rapids: George Heartwell
- Mayor of Warren, Michigan: James R. Fouts
- Mayor of Sterling Heights, Michigan: Richard J. Notte
- Mayor of Ann Arbor: John Hieftje/Christopher Taylor (Democrat)
- Mayor of Dearborn: John B. O'Reilly Jr.
- Mayor of Lansing: Virgil Bernero
- Mayor of Flint: Dayne Walling
- Mayor of Saginaw: Dennis Browning

=== Federal office holders ===
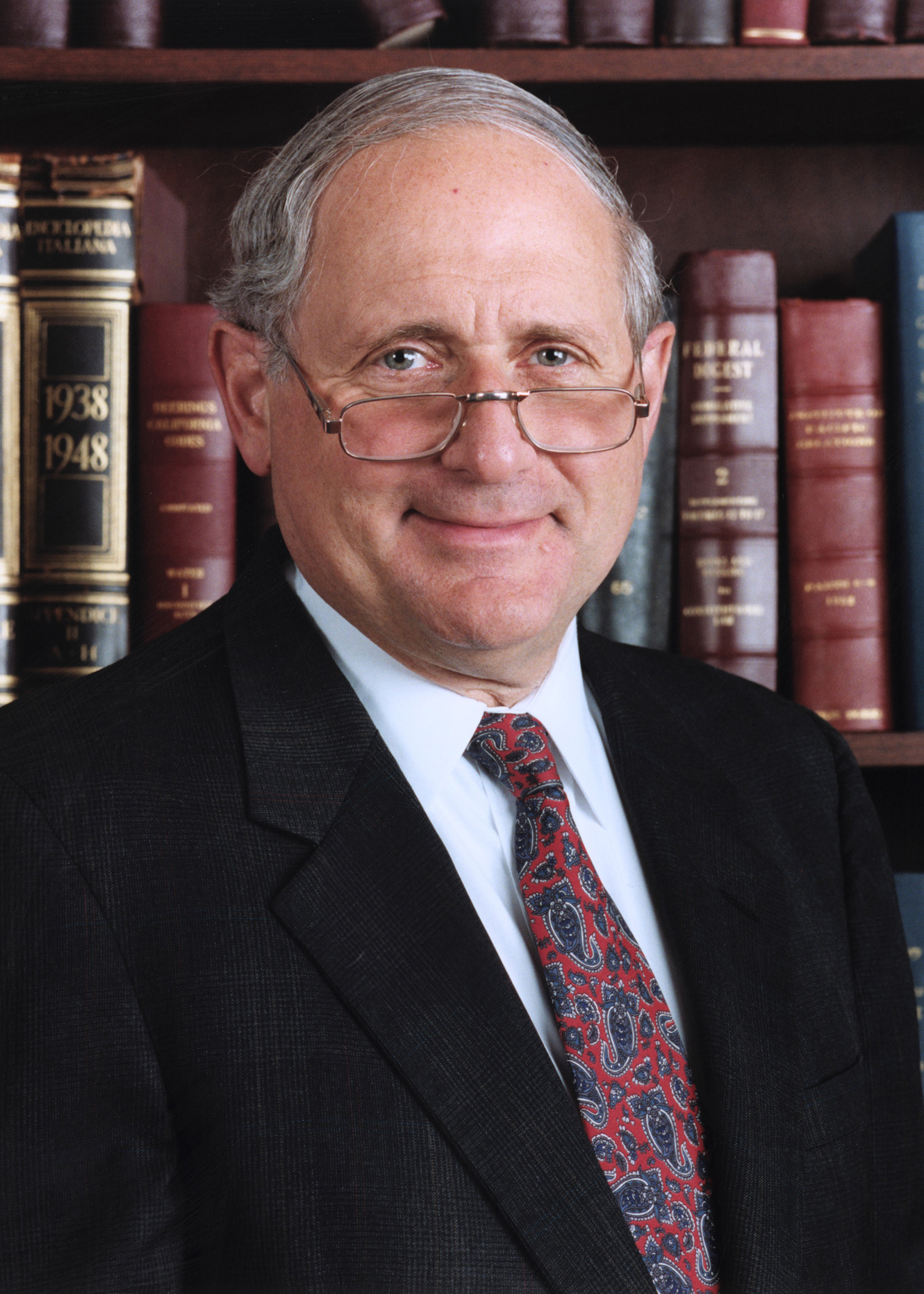
Carl Levin

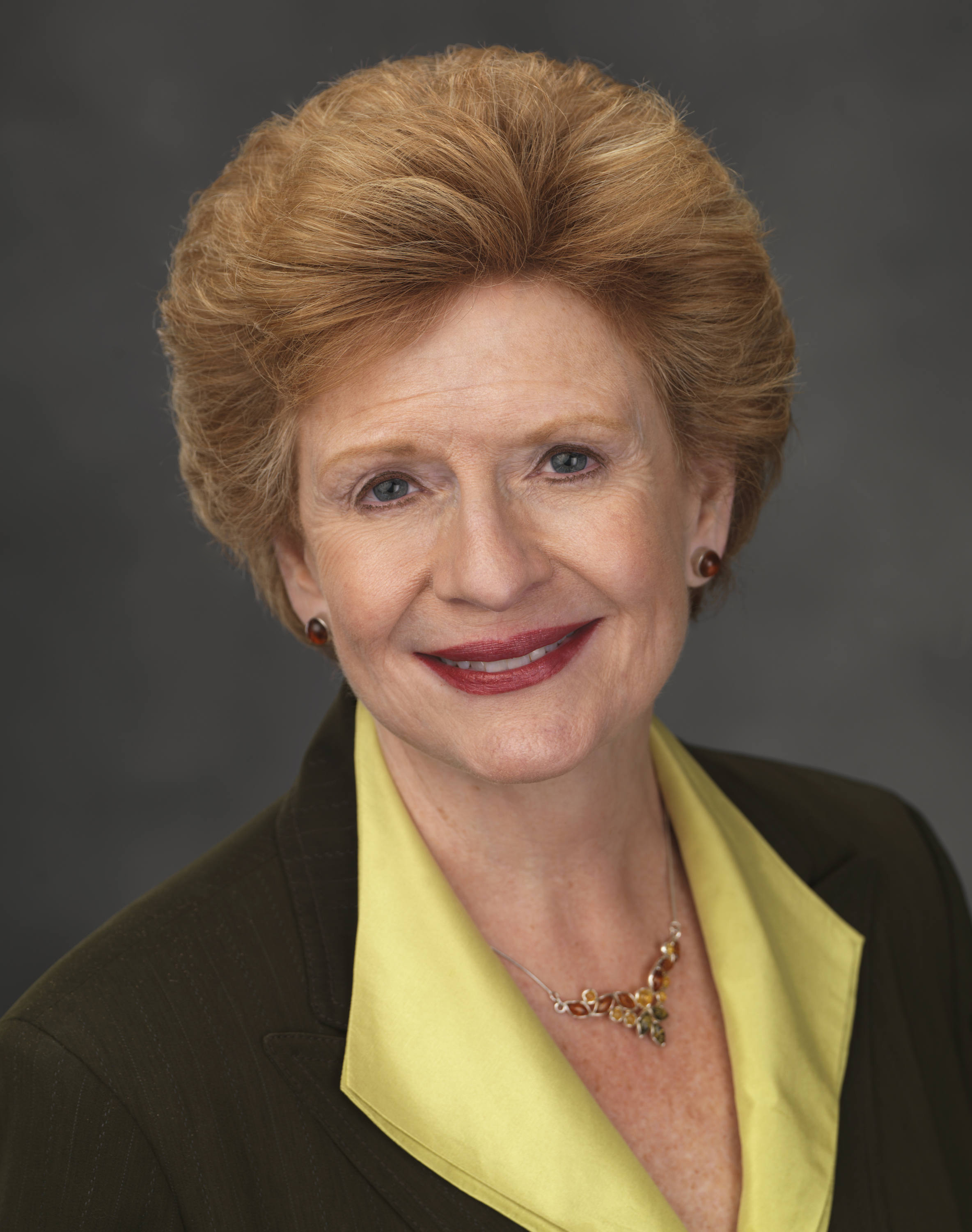
Debbie Stabenow

- U.S. Senator from Michigan: Debbie Stabenow (Democrat)
- U.S. Senator from Michigan: Carl Levin (Democrat)
- House District 1: Dan Benishek (Republican)
- House District 2: Bill Huizenga (Republican)
- House District 3: Justin Amash (Republican)
- House District 4: Dave Camp (Republican)
- House District 5: Dan Kildee (Democrat)
- House District 6: Fred Upton (Republican)
- House District 7: Tim Walberg (Republican)
- House District 8: Mike Rogers (Republican)
- House District 9: Sander Levin (Democrat)
- House District 10: Candice Miller (Republican)
- House District 11: Kerry Bentivolio (Republican)
- House District 12: John Dingell (Democrat)
- House District 13: John Conyers (Democrat)
- House District 14: Gary Peters (Democrat)

== Population ==
In the 2010 United States Census, Michigan was recorded as having a population of 9,883,640 persons, ranking as the eighth most populous state in the country.

The state's largest cities, having populations of at least 75,000 based on 2016 estimates, were as follows:

2017 Rank	City	County	2010 Pop.	2016 Pop.	Change 2010-16
1	Detroit	Wayne	713,777	672,795	−5.7% ▼
2	Grand Rapids	Kent	188,040	196,445	4.5% ▲
3	Warren	Macomb	134,056	135,125	0.8% ▲
4	Sterling Heights	Macomb	129,699	132,427	2.1% ▲
5	Ann Arbor	Washtenaw	113,934	120,782	6.0% ▲
6	Lansing	Ingham	114,297	116,020	1.5% ▲
7	Flint	Genesee	102,434	97,386	−4.9% ▼
8	Dearborn	Wayne	98,153	94,444	−3.8% ▼
9	Livonia	Wayne	96,942	94,041	−3.0% ▼
10	Troy	Oakland	80,980	83,641	3.3% ▲
11	Westland	Wayne	84,094	81,545	−3.0% ▼
12	Farmington Hills	Oakland	79,740	81,129	1.7% ▲
13	Kalamazoo	Kalamazoo	74,262	75,984	2.3% ▲
14	Wyoming	Kent	72,125	75,567	4.8% ▲

== Sports ==
=== Baseball ===
- 2014 Detroit Tigers season –
- 2014 Michigan Wolverines baseball team -
- 2014 Michigan Wolverines softball team -

=== American football ===
- 2014 Detroit Lions season –
- 2014 Michigan Wolverines football team -
- 2014 Michigan State Spartans football team -
- 2014 Western Michigan Broncos football team -
- 2014 Central Michigan Chippewas football team -
- 2014 Eastern Michigan Eagles football team -

=== Basketball ===
- 2013–14 Detroit Pistons season –
- 2013–14 Michigan State Spartans men's basketball team -
- 2013–14 Michigan Wolverines men's basketball team -
- 2013–14 Detroit Titans men's basketball team -
- 2013–14 Michigan State Spartans women's basketball team -
- 2013–14 Michigan Wolverines women's basketball team -

=== Ice hockey ===
- 2013–14 Detroit Red Wings season –
- 2013–14 Michigan Wolverines men's ice hockey team - In their 27th season under head coach Red Berenson, the Wolverines compiled an 18–13–4 record.
- 2013–14 Michigan State Spartans men's ice hockey team - Under head coach Tom Anastos, the Spartans compiled a 15–19–2 record.

=== Racing ===
- Port Huron to Mackinac Boat Race -
- Pure Michigan 400 -
- Detroit Grand Prix -

=== Other ===
- Michigan Open -

== Chronology of events ==
=== March ===
- March 21 - Judge Bernard A. Friedman issued a ruling in DeBoer v. Snyder finding unconstitutional Michigan's ban on adoption by same-sex couples. The decision was later reversed by the Sixth Circuit, but went before the Supreme Court in the landmark decision Obergefell v. Hodges

== Deaths ==
- January 12 - Connie Binsfeld, Lieutenant Governor (1991-1999), at age 89 at Glen Lake, Michigan
- January 25 - Dave Strack, University of Michigan basketball coach (1960–1968), at age 90 in Arizona
- January 31 - Anna Gordy Gaye, record executive and songwriter, at age 92 in Los Angeles
- March 9 - William Clay Ford Sr., chairman/owner of Detroit Lions, at age 88 in Grosse Pointe Shores
- March 15 - Scott Asheton, drummer and co-founder of The Stooges, at age 64 in Ann Arbor
- April 25 - Earl Morrall, quarterback for Michigan State and Detroit Lions (1958–1964), at age 79 in Florida
- May 25- Herb Jeffries, actor, singer and Detroit native, at age 100 in California
- June 1 - Ann B. Davis, University of Michigan alumnus and actress known for role as Alice on The Brady Bunch, at age 88 in San Antonio
- June 9 - Bob Welch, MLB pitcher and Detroit native, at age 57 in California
- June 15 - Casey Kasem, disc jockey and Detroit native, at age 82 in Washington
- July 9 - Tom Veryzer, shortstop for Detroit Tigers (1973–1977), at age 61 in New York
- July 17 - Elaine Stritch, actress and singer, at age 89 in Birmingham, Michigan
- August 8 - Red Wilson, catcher for Detroit Tigers (1954–1960), at age 85 in Wisconsin
- August 11 - Robin Williams, actor and comedian who grew up in Bloomfield Hills, at age 63 in California
- August 20 - Edmund Szoka, bishop of Gaylord (1971-1981), Archbishop of Detroit (1981-1990), at age 86 in Novi, Michigan
- September 10 - Richard Kiel, actor and Detroit native best known as "Jaws" in two James Bond movies, at age 74 in Fresno
- November 17 - Jimmy Ruffin, Motown soul singer ("What Becomes of the Brokenhearted"), at age 78 in Las Vegas
- December 10 - Don Dufek Sr., fullback at University of Michigan, at age 85 in Ann Arbor
- December 13 - Bill Bonds, TV news anchorman, at age 82 in Bloomfield Hills
- December 18 - Donald J. Albosta, U.S. Congress (1979-1985), at age 89 in St. Charles, Michigan
- December 25 - Alberta Adams, blues singer, at age 97 in Dearborn

=== Gallery of 2014 deaths ===
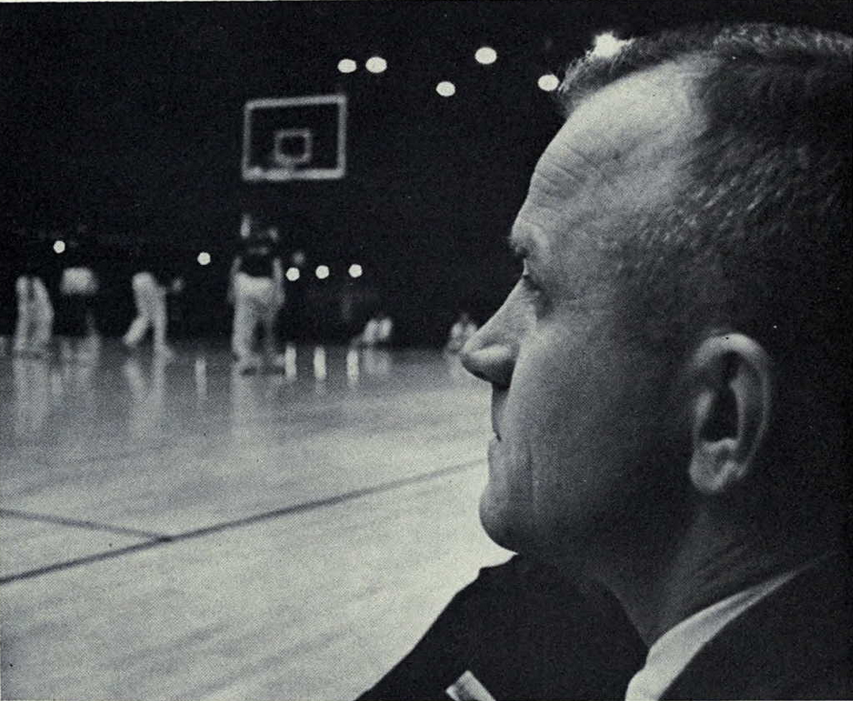
Dave Strack

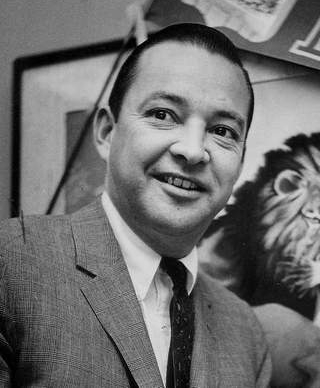
William Clay Ford Sr.

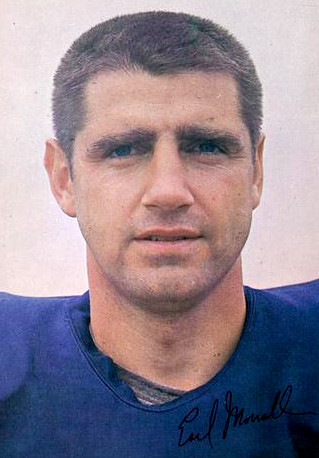
Earl Morrall

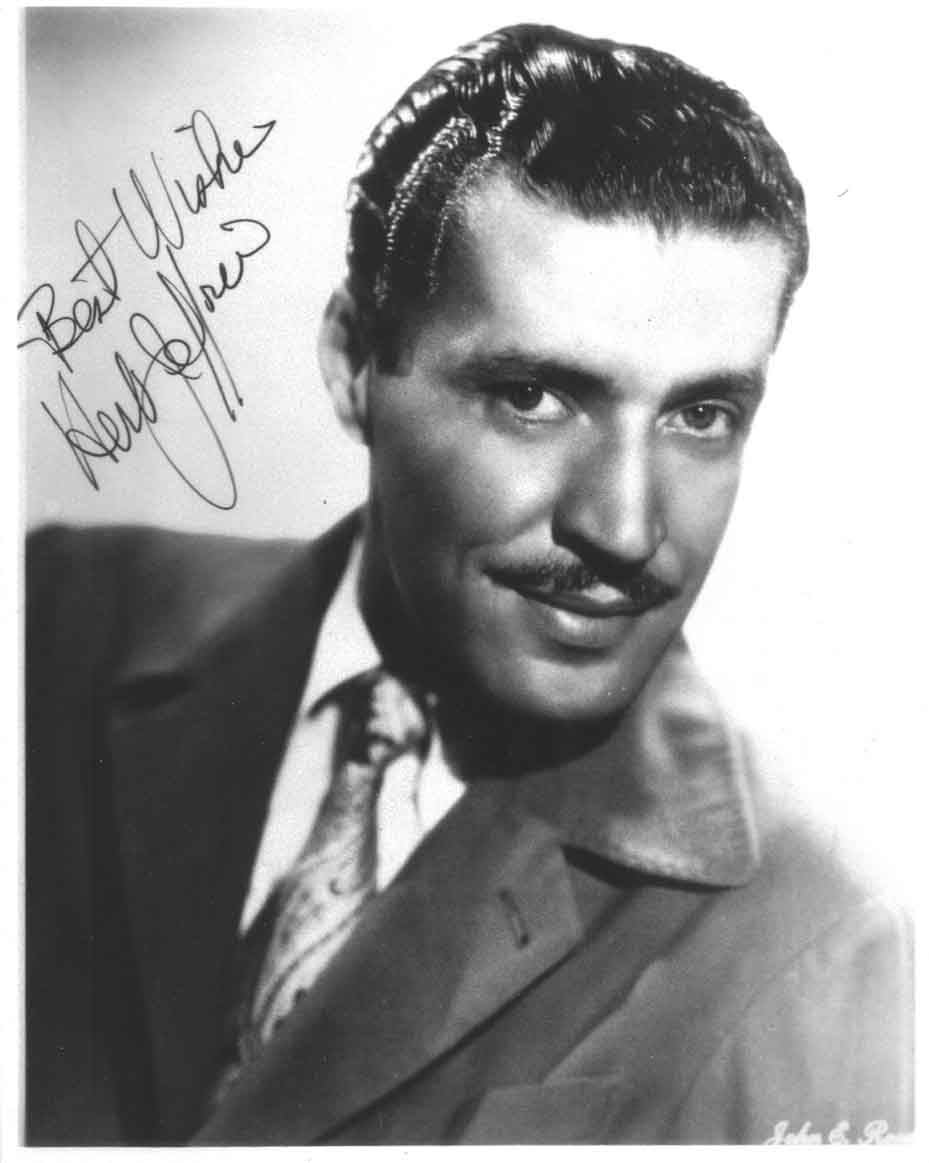
Herb Jeffries

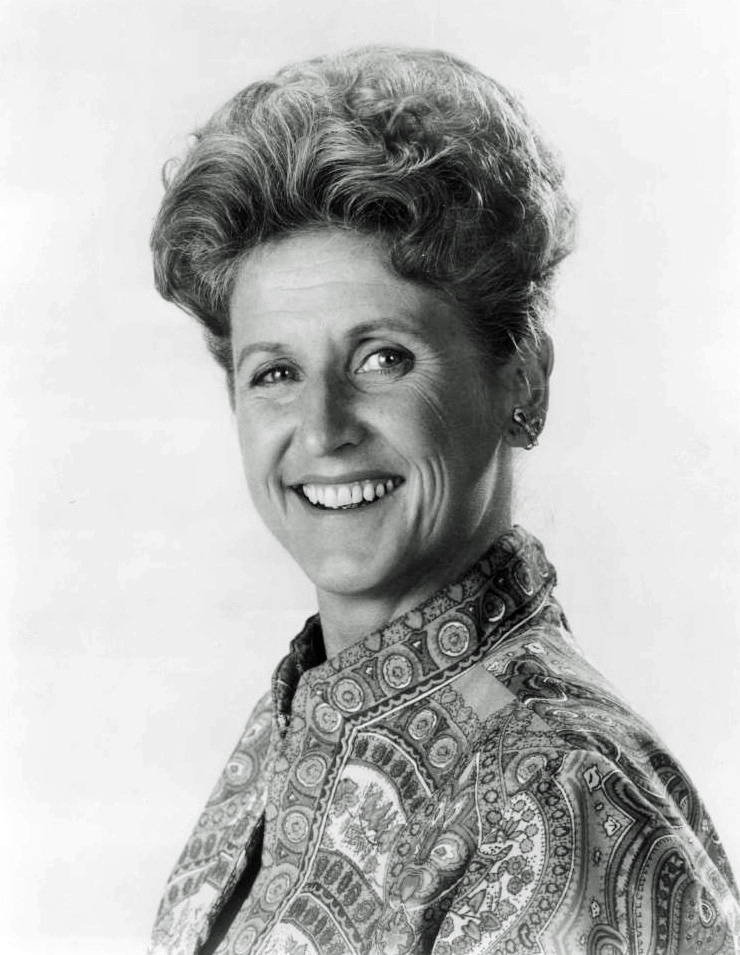
Ann B. Davis

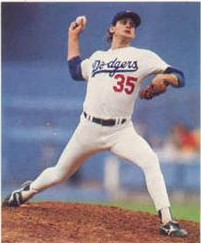
Bob Welch

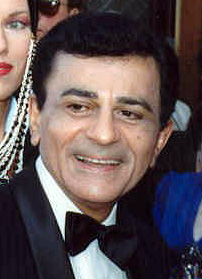
Casey Kasem

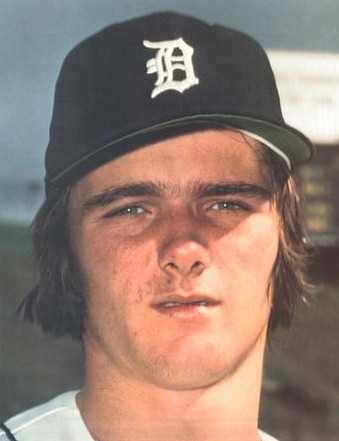
Tom Veryzer

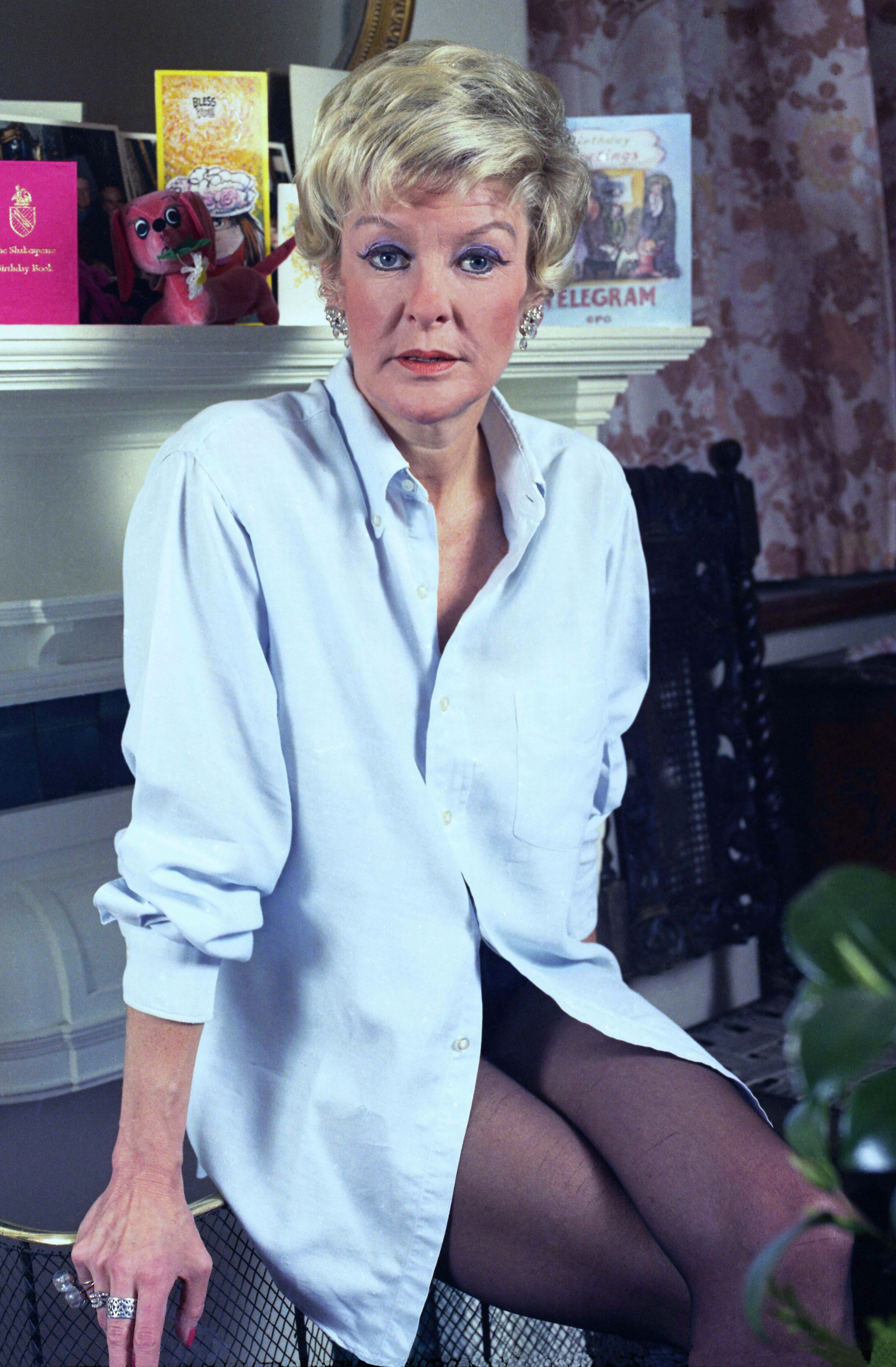
Elaine Stritch

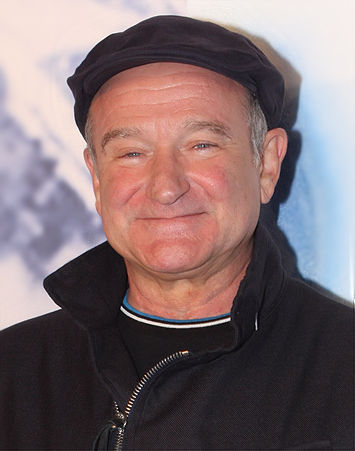
Robin Williams

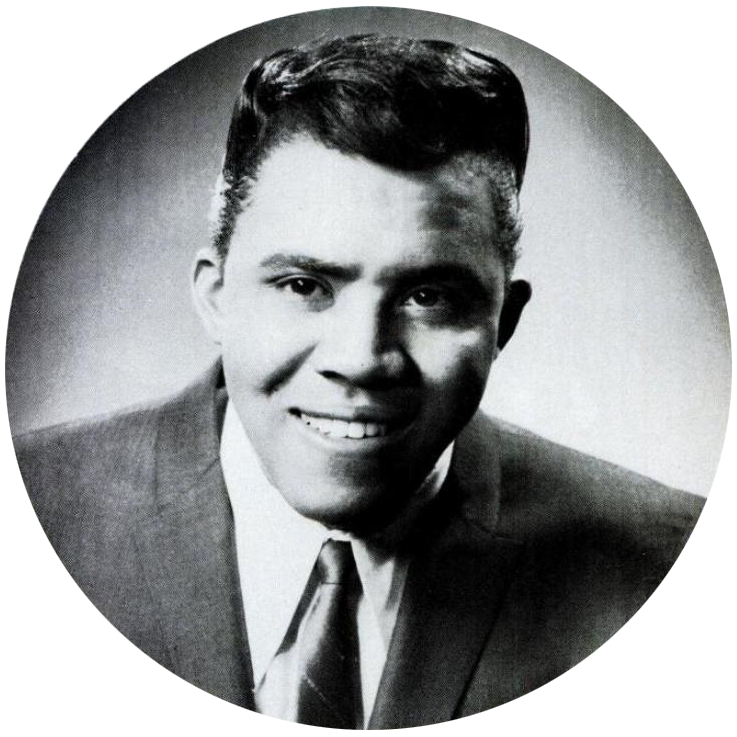
Jimmy Ruffin

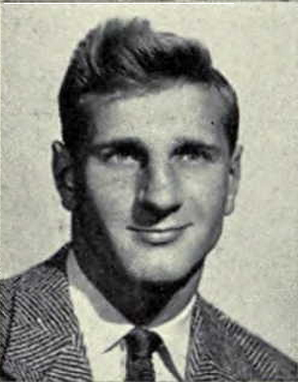
Don Dufek Sr.

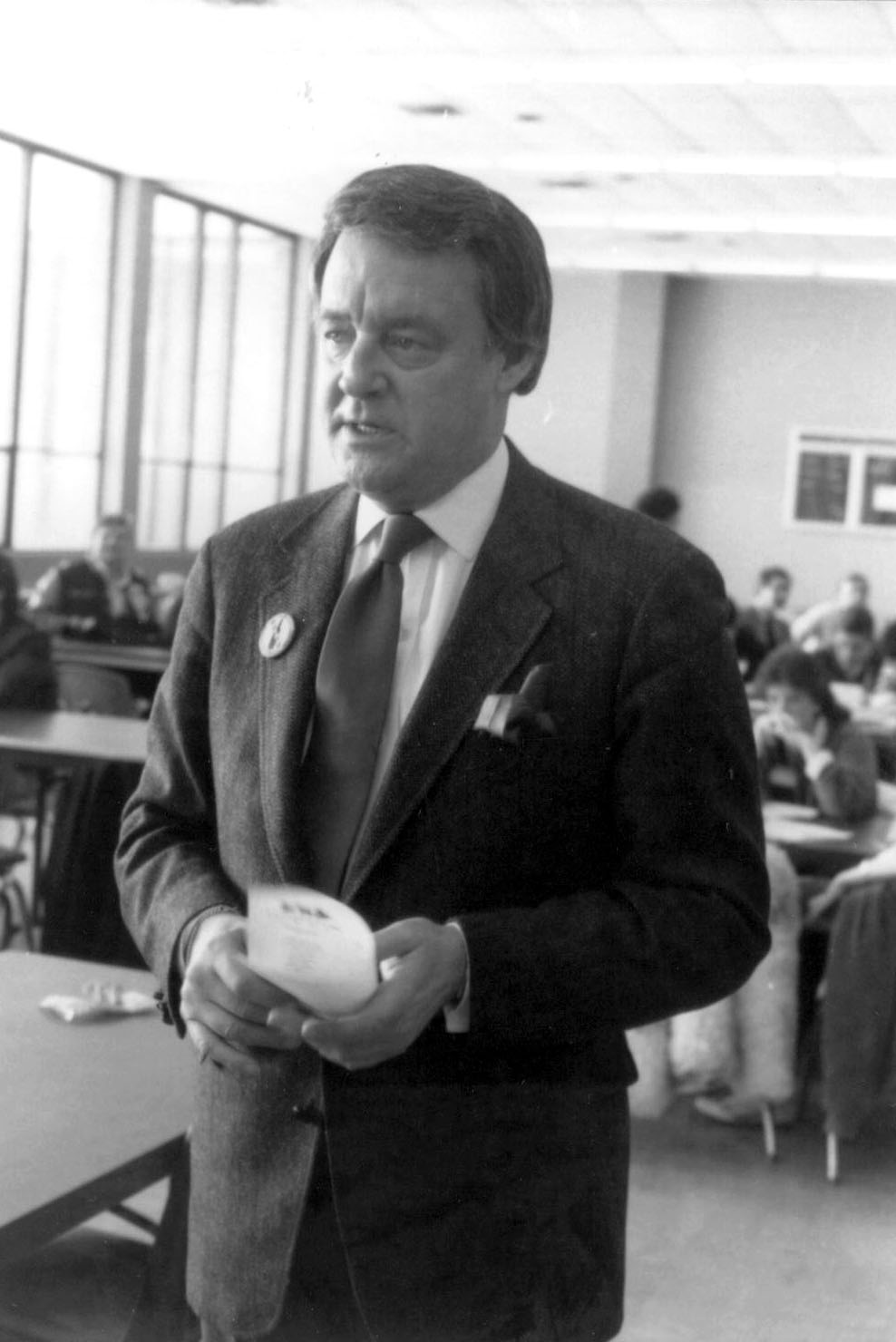
Bill Bonds

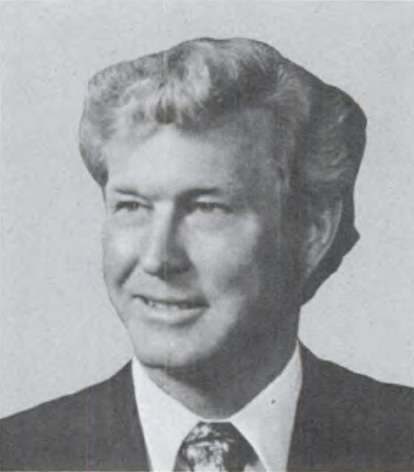
Donald J. Albosta

== See also ==
- History of Michigan
- History of Detroit
