= 2015 in Michigan =

- Decades: 1990s; 2000s; 2010s; 2020s
- See also: History of Michigan; Historical outline of Michigan; List of years in Michigan; 2015 in the United States

Events from the year 2015 in Michigan.

Top stories of 2015 included:

- The Flint water crisis, including a declaration of emergency by Flint's mayor on December 15 and the resignation of MDEQ Director Dan Wyant on December 29
- The emergence of Detroit from the Detroit bankruptcy
- The conviction of Bob Bashara in the Death of Jane Bashara
- The trial of Charles Pugh for having sex with a minor
- The role of two Michigan nurses in the June 24 Supreme Court decision (Obergefell v. Hodges) legalizing gay marriage
- The extramarital affair (and use of taxpayer funds to cover it up) between two freshmen Tea Party legislators (Todd Courser and Cindy Gamrat)
- The legal battle by Richard Wershe Jr., aka "White Boy Rick", to win his freedom
- Efforts to eradicate the New Zealand mud snail from Michigan waterways.

== Office holders ==
=== State office holders ===
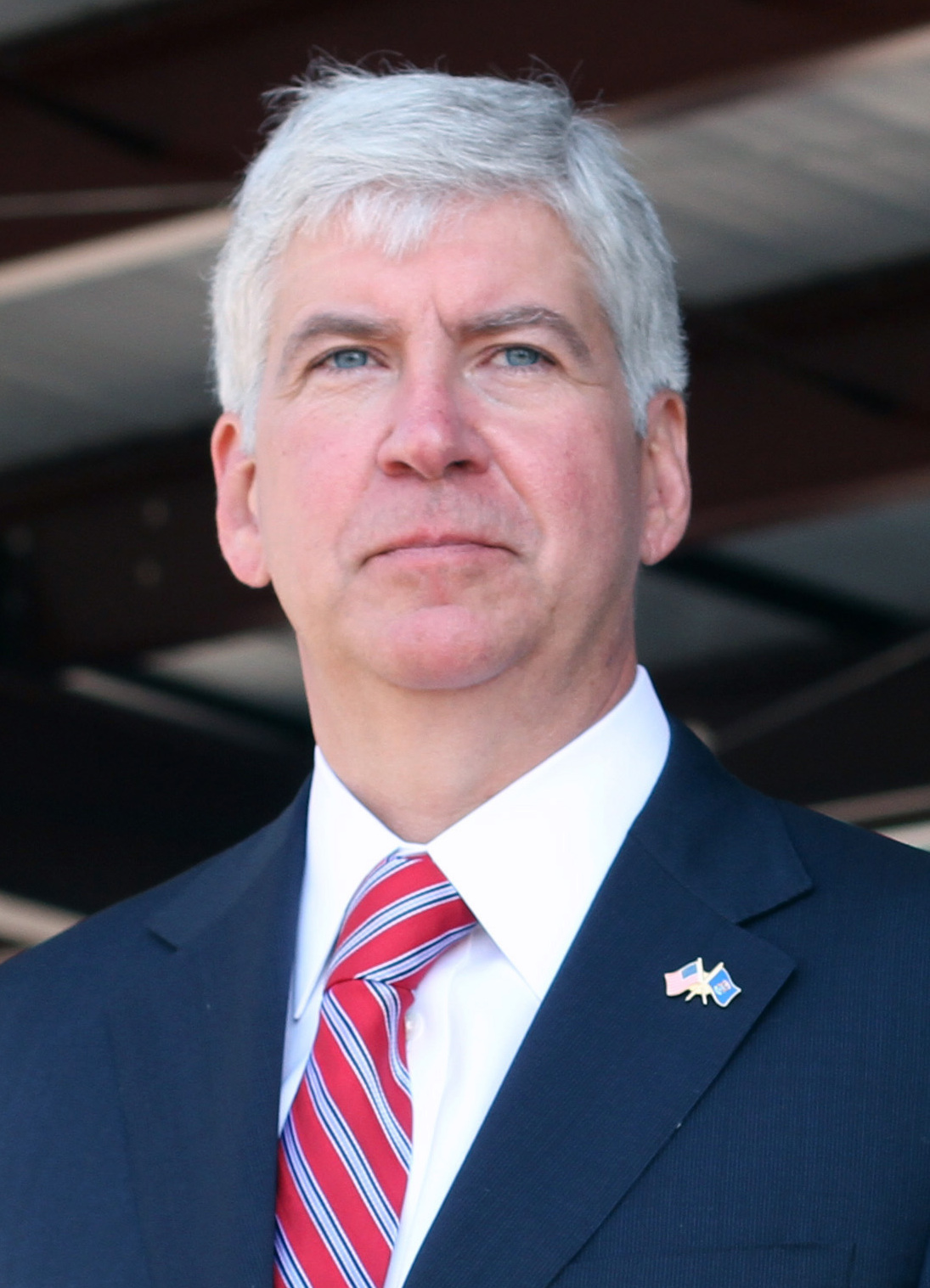
Rick Snyder

- Governor of Michigan: Rick Snyder (Republican)
- Lieutenant Governor of Michigan: Brian Calley (Republican)
- Michigan Attorney General: Bill Schuette (Republican)
- Michigan Secretary of State: Ruth Johnson (Republican)
- Speaker of the Michigan House of Representatives: Jase Bolger (Republican) (until January 14), Kevin Cotter (Republican) (starting January 14)
- Majority Leader of the Michigan Senate: Randy Richardville (Republican) (until January 14), Arlan Meekhof (Republican) (starting January 14)
- Chief Justice, Michigan Supreme Court: Robert P. Young Jr.

=== Mayors of major cities ===
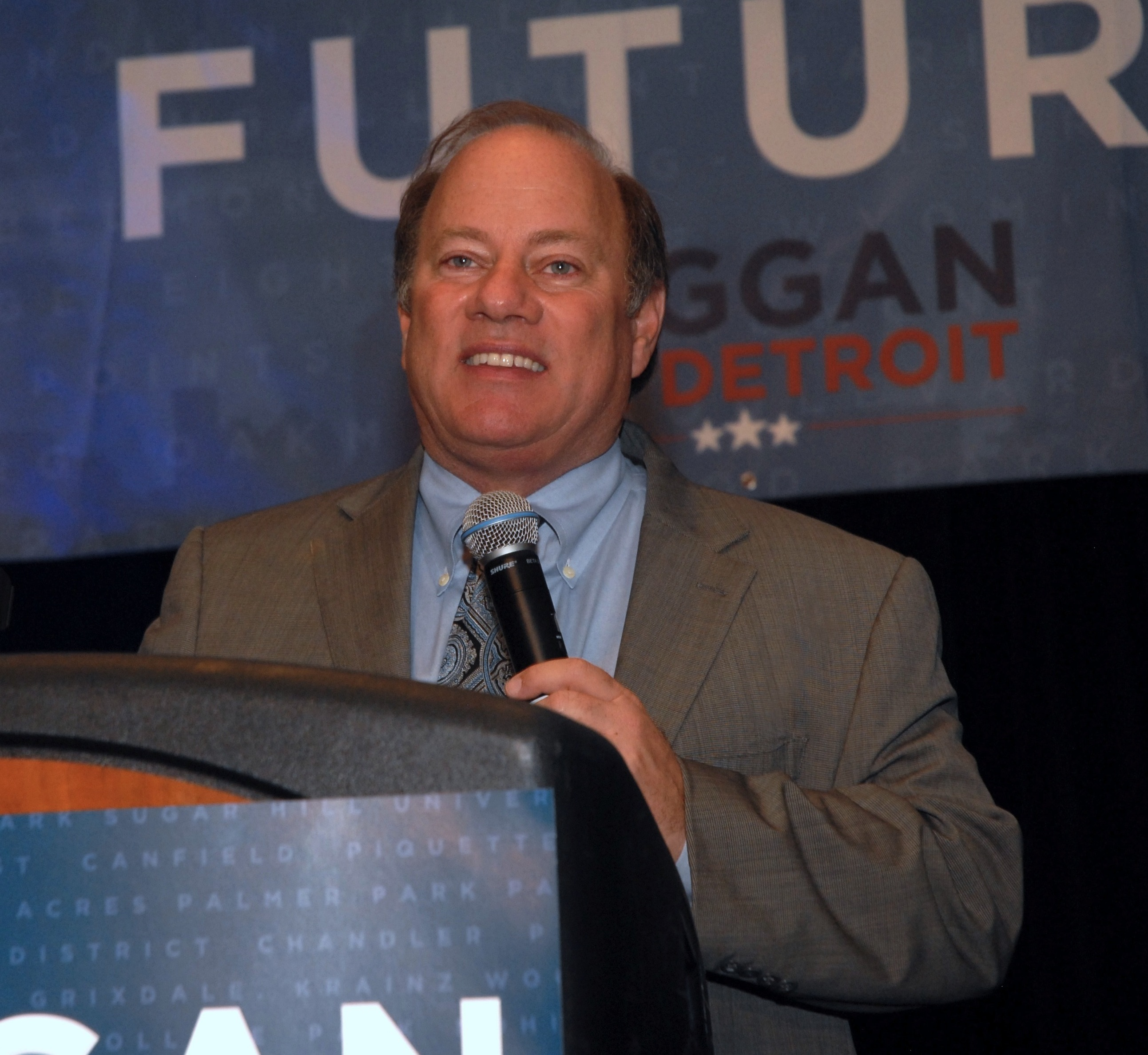
Mike Duggan

- Mayor of Detroit: Mike Duggan (Democrat)
- Mayor of Grand Rapids: George Heartwell
- Mayor of Warren, Michigan: James R. Fouts
- Mayor of Sterling Heights, Michigan: Michael C. Taylor
- Mayor of Ann Arbor: Christopher Taylor (Democrat)
- Mayor of Dearborn: John B. O'Reilly Jr.
- Mayor of Lansing: Virgil Bernero
- Mayor of Flint: Dayne Walling/Karen Weaver
- Mayor of Saginaw: Dennis Browning

=== Federal office holders ===
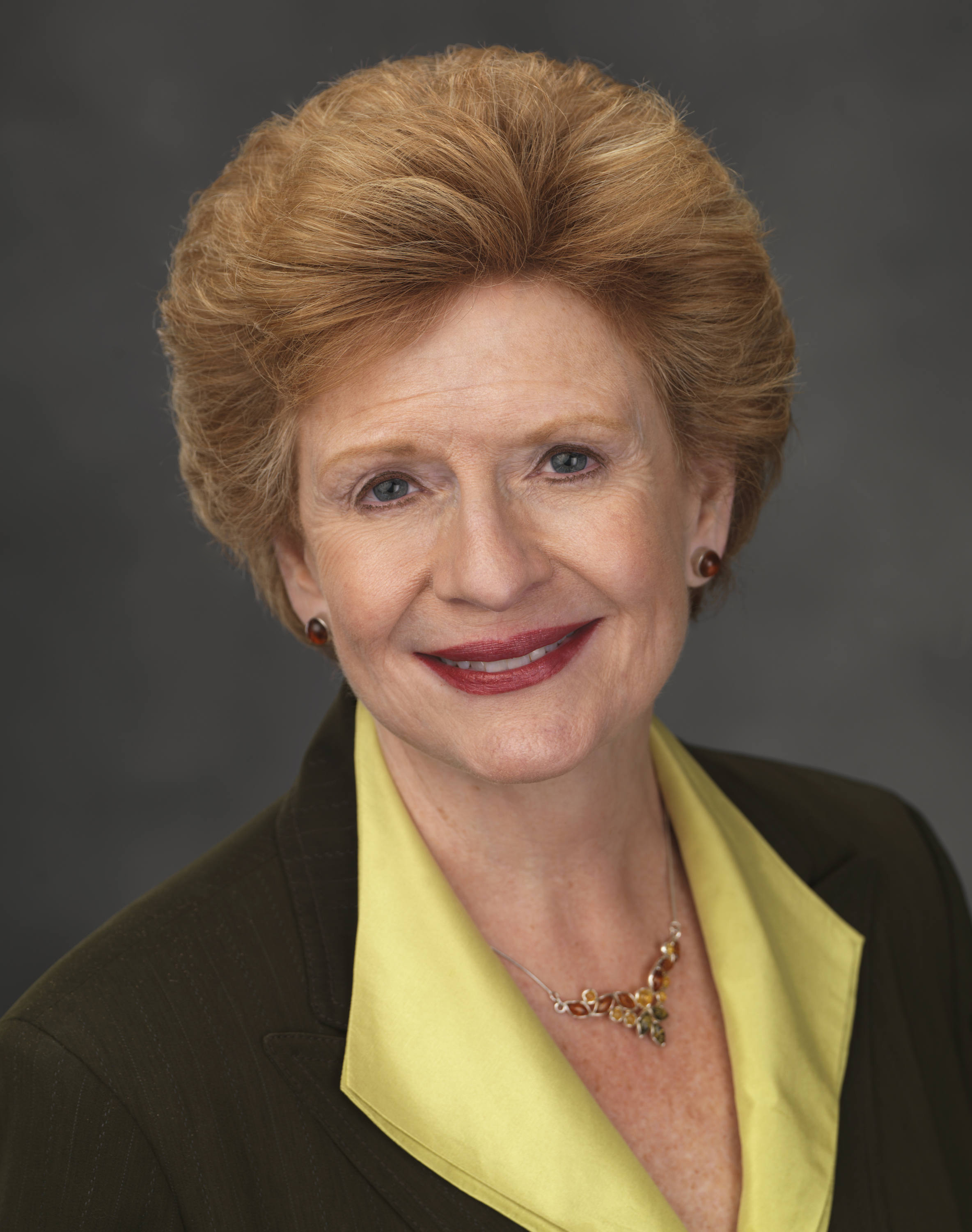
Debbie Stabenow

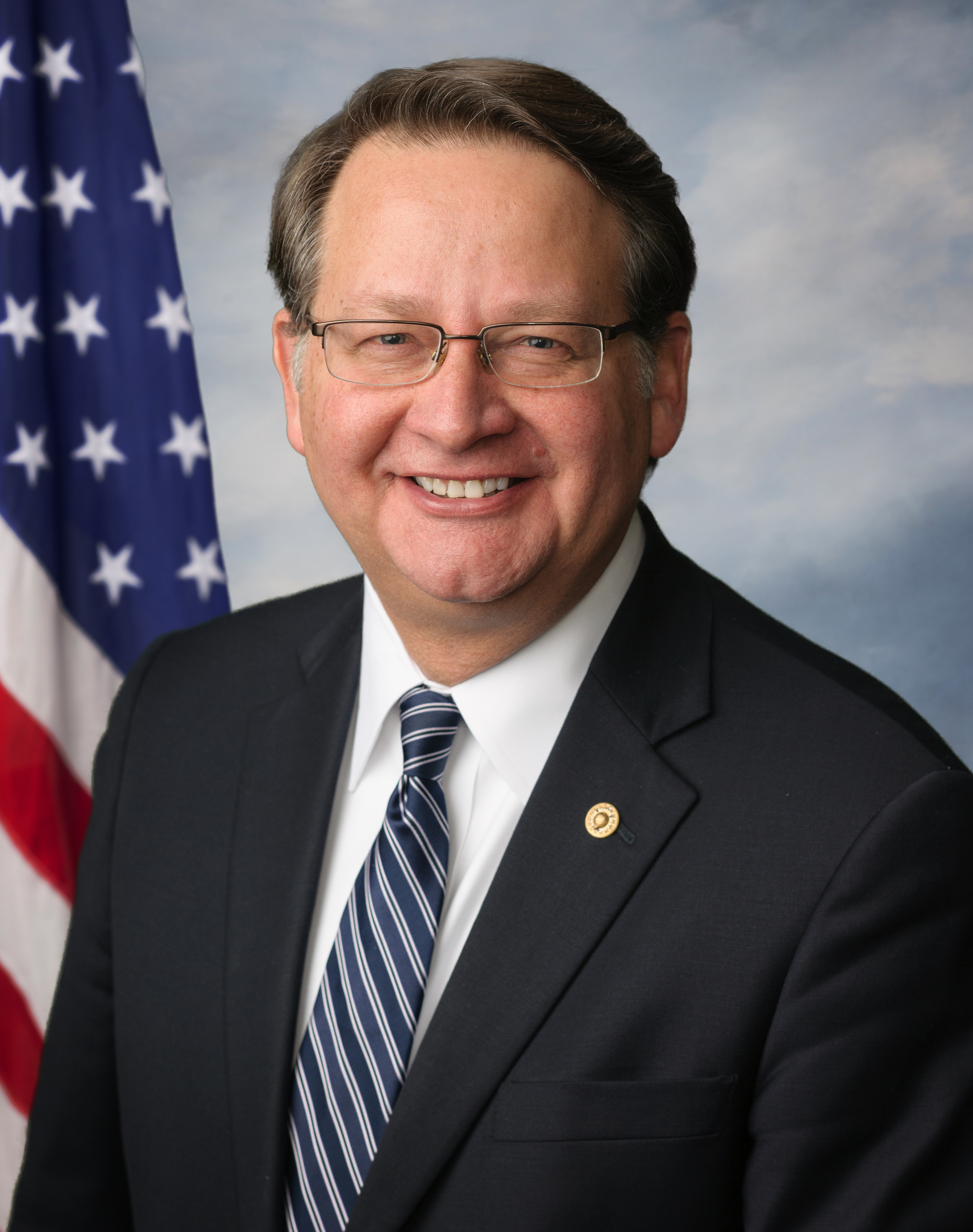
Gary Peters

- U.S. Senator from Michigan: Debbie Stabenow (Democrat)
- U.S. Senator from Michigan: Gary Peters (Democrat)
- House District 1: Dan Benishek (Republican)
- House District 2: Bill Huizenga (Republican)
- House District 3: Justin Amash (Republican)
- House District 4: John Moolenaar (Republican)
- House District 5: Dan Kildee (Democrat)
- House District 6: Fred Upton (Republican)
- House District 7: Tim Walberg (Republican)
- House District 8: Mike Bishop (Republican)
- House District 9: Sander Levin (Democrat)
- House District 10: Candice Miller (Republican)
- House District 11: David Trott (Republican)
- House District 12: Debbie Dingell (Democrat)
- House District 13: John Conyers (Democrat)
- House District 14: Brenda Lawrence (Democrat)

== Population ==
In the 2010 United States Census, Michigan was recorded as having a population of 9,883,640 persons, ranking as the eighth most populous state in the country.

The state's largest cities, having populations of at least 75,000 based on 2016 estimates, were as follows:

2017 Rank	City	County	2010 Pop.	2016 Pop.	Change 2010-16
1	Detroit	Wayne	713,777	672,795	−5.7% ▼
2	Grand Rapids	Kent	188,040	196,445	4.5% ▲
3	Warren	Macomb	134,056	135,125	0.8% ▲
4	Sterling Heights	Macomb	129,699	132,427	2.1% ▲
5	Ann Arbor	Washtenaw	113,934	120,782	6.0% ▲
6	Lansing	Ingham	114,297	116,020	1.5% ▲
7	Flint	Genesee	102,434	97,386	−4.9% ▼
8	Dearborn	Wayne	98,153	94,444	−3.8% ▼
9	Livonia	Wayne	96,942	94,041	−3.0% ▼
10	Troy	Oakland	80,980	83,641	3.3% ▲
11	Westland	Wayne	84,094	81,545	−3.0% ▼
12	Farmington Hills	Oakland	79,740	81,129	1.7% ▲
13	Kalamazoo	Kalamazoo	74,262	75,984	2.3% ▲
14	Wyoming	Kent	72,125	75,567	4.8% ▲

== Sports ==
=== Baseball ===
- 2015 Detroit Tigers season –
- 2015 Michigan Wolverines baseball team -
- 2015 Michigan Wolverines softball team -

=== American football ===
- 2015 Detroit Lions season –
- 2015 Michigan Wolverines football team -
- 2015 Michigan State Spartans football team -
- 2015 Western Michigan Broncos football team -
- 2015 Central Michigan Chippewas football team -
- 2015 Eastern Michigan Eagles football team -

=== Basketball ===
- 2014–15 Detroit Pistons season –
- 2014–15 Michigan State Spartans men's basketball team -
- 2014–15 Michigan Wolverines men's basketball team -
- 2014–15 Detroit Titans men's basketball team -
- 2014–15 Michigan State Spartans women's basketball team -
- 2014–15 Michigan Wolverines women's basketball team -

=== Ice hockey ===
- 2014–15 Detroit Red Wings season –
- 2014–15 Michigan Wolverines men's ice hockey team - In their 28th season under head coach Red Berenson, the Wolverines compiled a 22–15 record.
- 2014–15 Michigan State Spartans men's ice hockey team - Under head coach Tom Anastos, the Spartans compiled a 17–16–2 record.

=== Racing ===
- Port Huron to Mackinac Boat Race -
- Pure Michigan 400 -
- Detroit Grand Prix - not held

=== Other ===
- Michigan Open -

== Chronology of events ==
=== September ===
- September 11 - Todd Courser resigns and Cindy Gamrat is expelled from the Michigan House of Representatives following a sex scandal.

== Deaths ==
- January 9 - Roy Tarpley, University of Michigan basketball player (1982–1986), at age 50 in Texas
- February 2 - Dave Bergman, Detroit Tigers first baseman (1984–1992), at age 61 in Grosse Pointe Woods
- April 16 - Robert P. Griffin, U.S. Senator from Michigan (1966–1979), at age 91 in Traverse City, Michigan
- April 17 - A. Alfred Taubman, businessman and entrepreneur, at age 91 in Bloomfield Hills
- April 26 - Marcel Pronovost, Hall of Fame player for Detroit Red Wings (1949–65), at age 84 in Windsor, Ontario
- April 29 - Calvin Peete, professional golfer and Detroit native, at age 71 in Atlanta
- June 5 - Jane Briggs Hart, aviator and Detroit native, at age 93 in Connecticut
- June 23 - Tommy Hudspeth, Detroit Lions head coach (1976-1977), at age 83 in Oklahoma
- July 2 - Charlie Sanders, Hall of Fame tight end for Detroit Lions (1968–1977), at age 68 in Royal Oak
- August 3 - Mel Farr, Detroit Lions running back (1967–1973) and automobile dealer, at age 70 in Detroit
- August 29 - Wayne Dyer, self-help author and Detroit native, at age 75 in Hawaii
- October 12 - Joan Leslie, actress and Detroit native, at age 90 in Los Angeles
- October 19 - Bill Daley, All-American back for Michigan in 1943, at age 96 in Minnesota
- December 22 - Daisy Elliott, politician and realtor, at age 98 in Detroit

=== Gallery of 2015 deaths ===
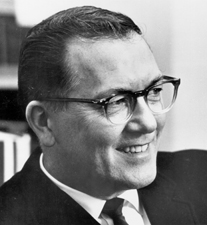
Robert P. Griffin

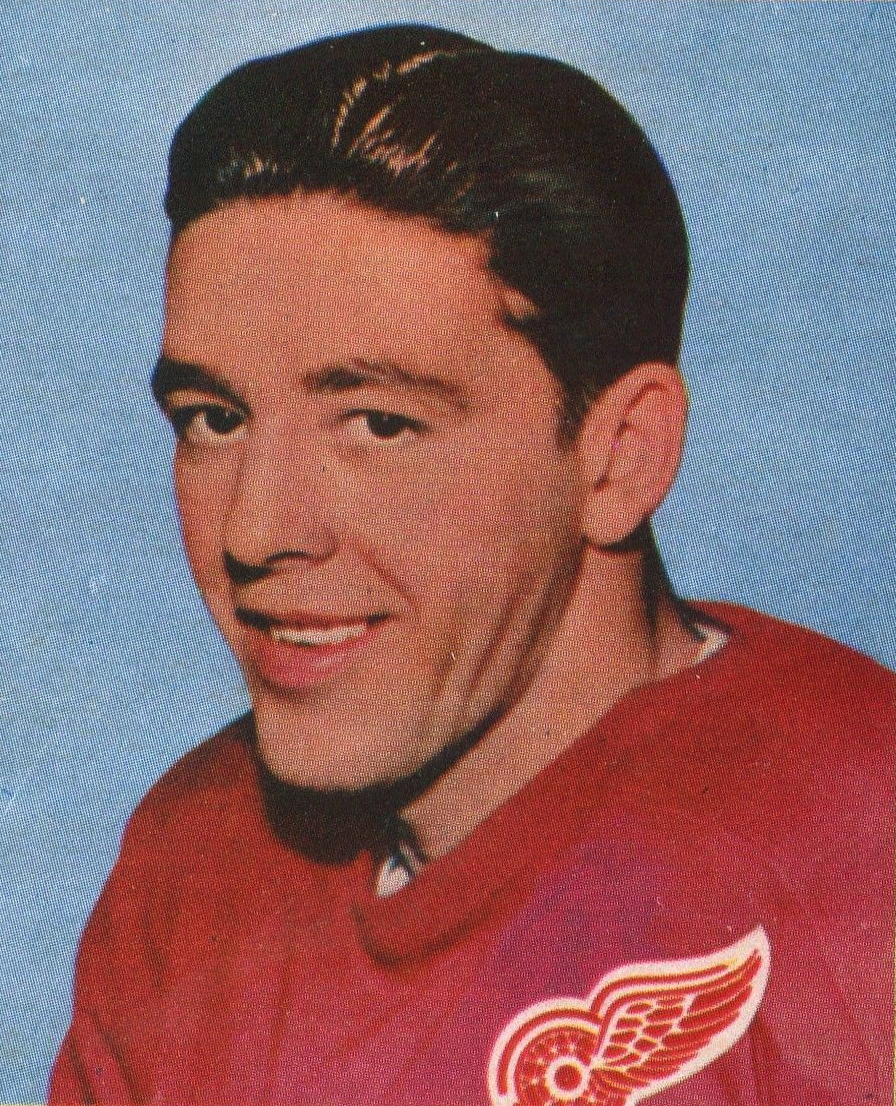
Marcel Pronovost

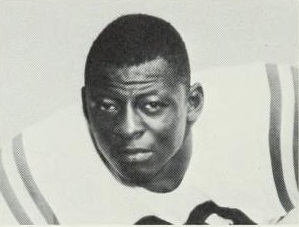
Mel Farr

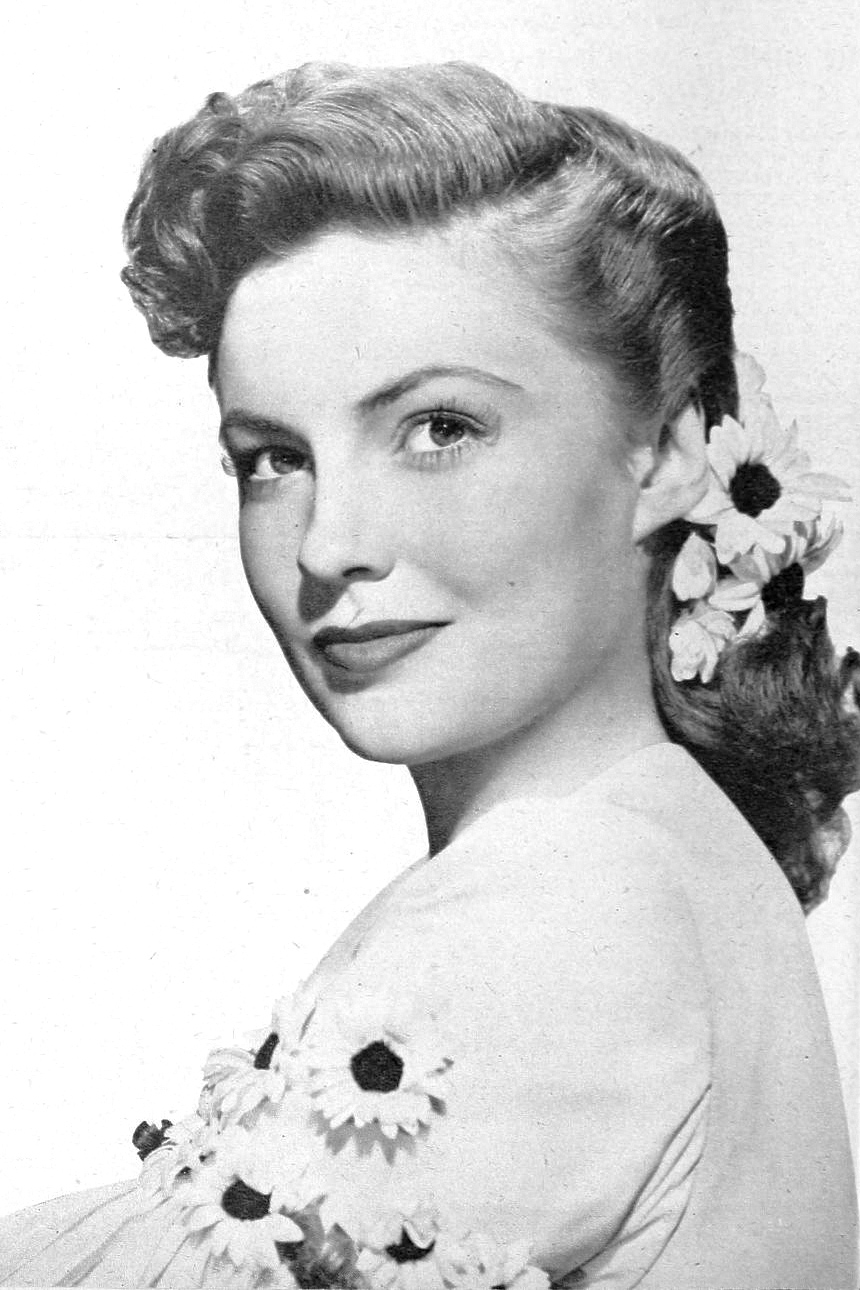
Joan Leslie

== See also ==
- History of Michigan
- History of Detroit
