= 2013 in Michigan =

- Decades: 1990s; 2000s; 2010s; 2020s
- See also: History of Michigan; Historical outline of Michigan; List of years in Michigan; 2013 in the United States

Events from the year 2013 in Michigan.

== Office holders ==
=== State office holders ===
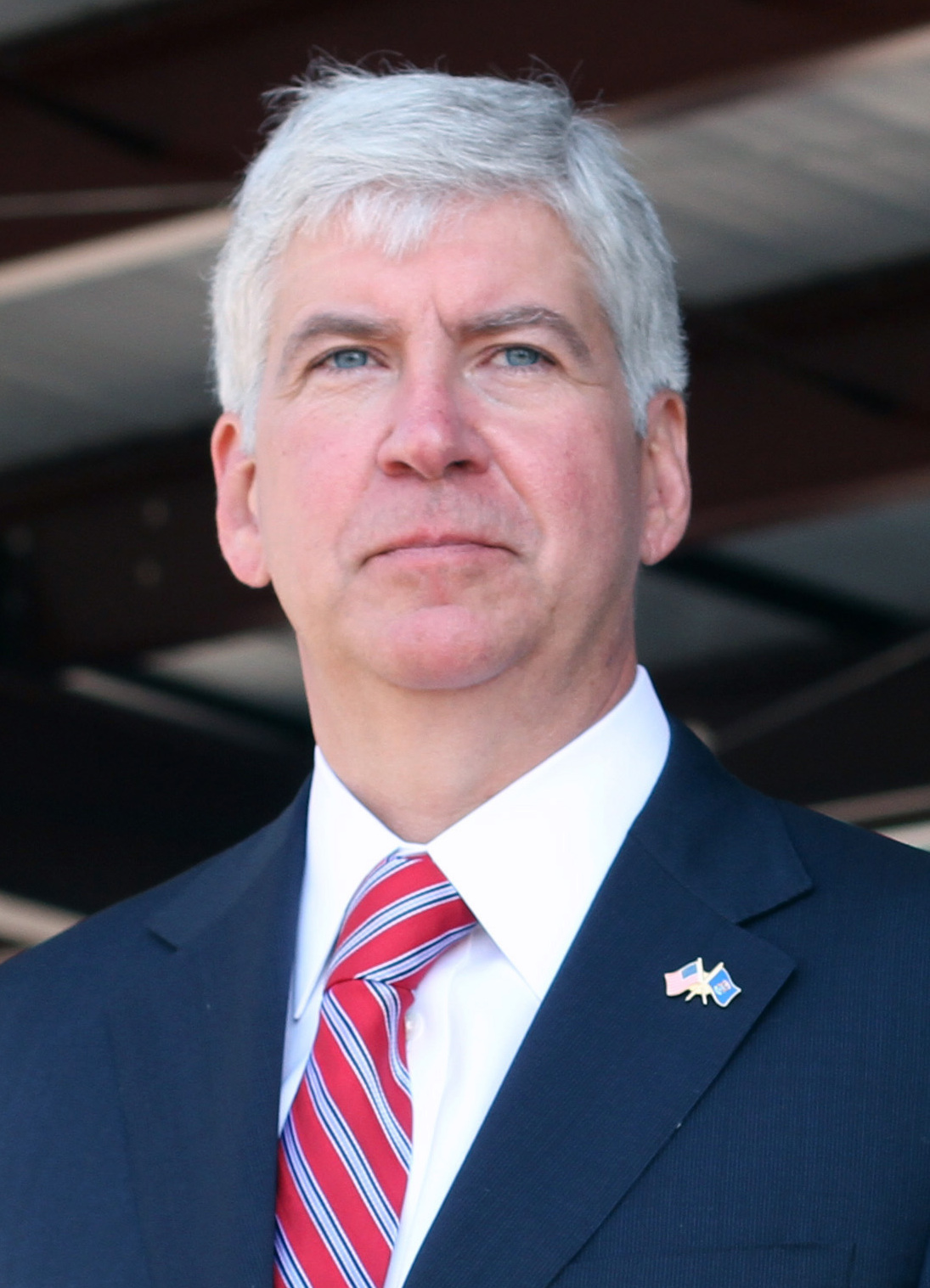
Rick Snyder

- Governor of Michigan: Rick Snyder (Republican)
- Lieutenant Governor of Michigan: Brian Calley (Republican)
- Michigan Attorney General: Bill Schuette (Republican)
- Michigan Secretary of State: Ruth Johnson (Republican)
- Speaker of the Michigan House of Representatives: Jase Bolger (Republican)
- Majority Leader of the Michigan Senate: Randy Richardville (Republican)
- Chief Justice, Michigan Supreme Court: Robert P. Young Jr.

=== Mayors of major cities ===
- Mayor of Detroit: Dave Bing (Democrat)
- Mayor of Grand Rapids: George Heartwell
- Mayor of Warren, Michigan: James R. Fouts
- Mayor of Sterling Heights, Michigan: Richard J. Notte
- Mayor of Ann Arbor: John Hieftje (Democrat)
- Mayor of Dearborn: John B. O'Reilly Jr.
- Mayor of Lansing: Virgil Bernero
- Mayor of Flint: Dayne Walling
- Mayor of Saginaw: Greg Branch/Dennis Browning

=== Federal office holders ===
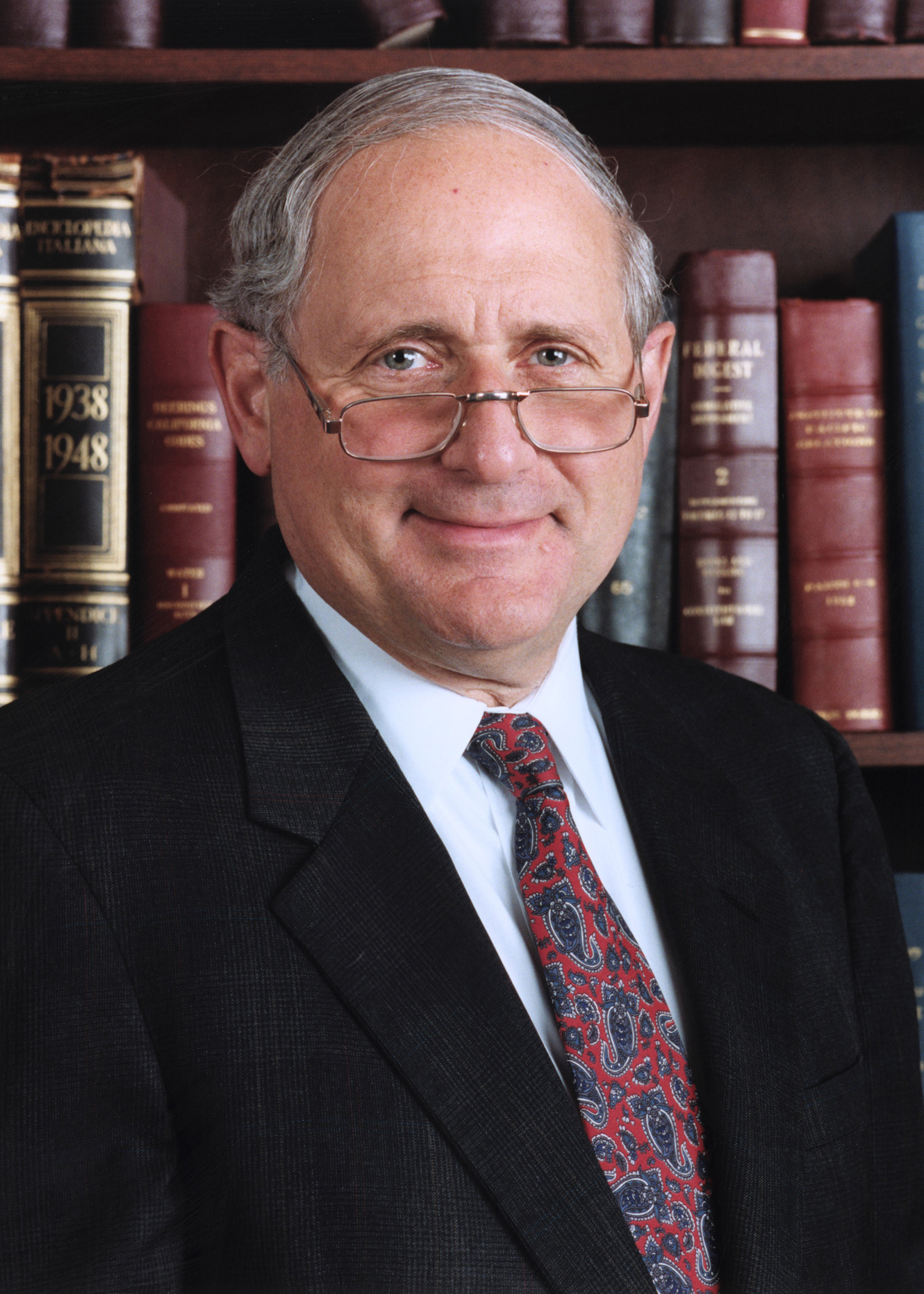
Carl Levin

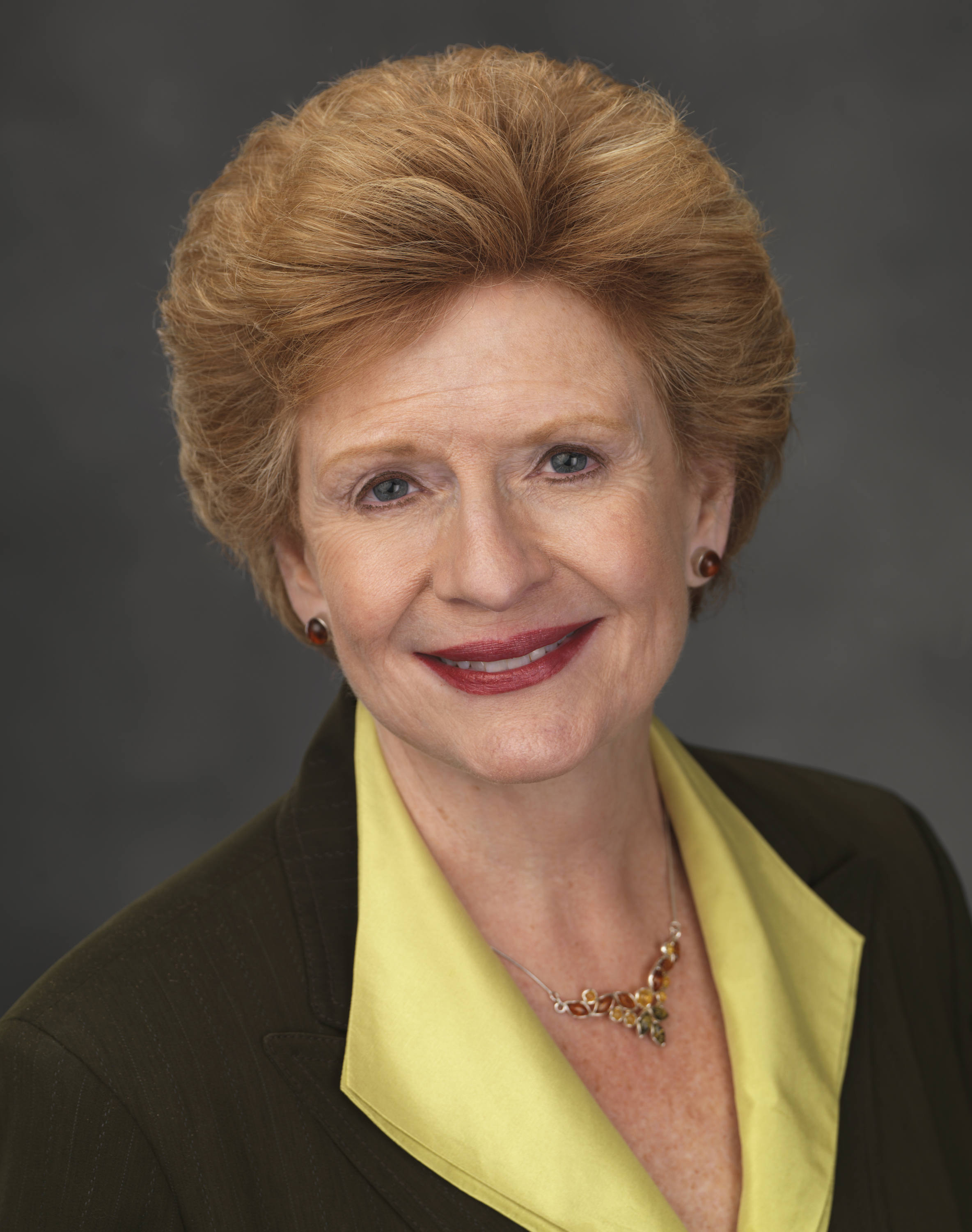
Debbie Stabenow

- U.S. Senator from Michigan: Debbie Stabenow (Democrat)
- U.S. Senator from Michigan: Carl Levin (Democrat)
- House District 1: Dan Benishek (Republican)
- House District 2: Bill Huizenga (Republican)
- House District 3: Justin Amash (Republican)
- House District 4: Dave Camp (Republican)
- House District 5: Dale Kildee (Democrat)
- House District 6: Fred Upton (Republican)
- House District 7: Tim Walberg (Republican)
- House District 8: Mike Rogers (Republican)
- House District 9: Sander Levin (Democrat)
- House District 10: Candice Miller (Republican)
- House District 11: David Curson (Democrat)
- House District 12: John Dingell (Democrat)
- House District 13: John Conyers (Democrat)
- House District 14: Gary Peters (Democrat)

== Population ==
In the 2010 United States Census, Michigan was recorded as having a population of 9,883,640 persons, ranking as the eighth most populous state in the country.

The state's largest cities, having populations of at least 75,000 based on 2016 estimates, were as follows:

2017 Rank	City	County	2010 Pop.	2016 Pop.	Change 2010-16
1	Detroit	Wayne	713,777	672,795	−5.7% ▼
2	Grand Rapids	Kent	188,040	196,445	4.5% ▲
3	Warren	Macomb	134,056	135,125	0.8% ▲
4	Sterling Heights	Macomb	129,699	132,427	2.1% ▲
5	Ann Arbor	Washtenaw	113,934	120,782	6.0% ▲
6	Lansing	Ingham	114,297	116,020	1.5% ▲
7	Flint	Genesee	102,434	97,386	−4.9% ▼
8	Dearborn	Wayne	98,153	94,444	−3.8% ▼
9	Livonia	Wayne	96,942	94,041	−3.0% ▼
10	Troy	Oakland	80,980	83,641	3.3% ▲
11	Westland	Wayne	84,094	81,545	−3.0% ▼
12	Farmington Hills	Oakland	79,740	81,129	1.7% ▲
13	Kalamazoo	Kalamazoo	74,262	75,984	2.3% ▲
14	Wyoming	Kent	72,125	75,567	4.8% ▲

== Sports ==
=== Baseball ===
- 2013 Detroit Tigers season – Under manager Jim Leyland, the Tigers compiled a 93-69 record, finished first in the American League Central, defeated Oakland in the divisional series and lost to Boston in the American League Championship Series. The team's statistical leaders included Miguel Cabrera with a .348 batting average, 44 home runs, and 137 RBIs, Max Scherzer with 21 wins, and Joaquin Benoit with a 2.01 earned run average
- 2013 Michigan Wolverines baseball team -
- 2013 Michigan Wolverines softball team -

=== American football ===
- 2013 Detroit Lions season – Under coach Jim Schwartz, the Lions compiles a 7-9 record and finished third in the NFC North Division. The team's statistical leaders included Matthew Stafford with 4,650 passing yards, Reggie Bush with 1,006 rushing yards, Calvin Johnson with 1,492 receiving yards, and David Akers with 99 points scored.
- 2013 Michigan State Spartans football team - Under head coach Mark Dantonio, the Spartans compiled a 13-1 record, defeated Stanford in the 2014 Rose Bowl, and were ranked No. 3 in the final AP Poll. The team's statistical leaders included Connor Cook with 2,755 passing yards, Jeremy Langford with 1,422 rushing yards and 114 points scored, and Bennie Fowler with 622 receiving yards.
- 2013 Michigan Wolverines football team - Under head coach Brady Hoke, the Wolverines compiled a 7-6 record and lost to Kansas State in the Buffalo Wild Wings Bowl. The team's statistical leaders included Devin Gardner with 2,960 passing yards, Fitzgerald Toussaint with 648 rushing yards, Jeremy Gallon with 1,373 receiving yards, and Brendan Gibbons with 89 points scored.
- 2013 Western Michigan Broncos football team - In their first season under head coach P. J. Fleck, the Broncos compiled a 1–11 record.
- 2013 Central Michigan Chippewas football team - Under head coach Dan Enos, the Chippewas compiled a 6–6 record.
- 2013 Eastern Michigan Eagles football team - Under head coaches Ron English (first 9 games) and Stan Parrish (final 3 games), the Eagles compiled a 2–10 record.

=== Basketball ===
- 2012–13 Detroit Pistons season – Under coach Lawrence Frank, the Pistons compiled a 29-53 record. The team's statistical leaders included Greg Monroe with 1,298 points scored and 777 rebounds and Brandon Knight with 303 assists.
- 2012–13 Michigan State Spartans men's basketball team - Under head coach Tom Izzo, the Spartans compiled a 27-9 record and lost to Duke in the Midwest Regional semifinal. The team's statistical leaders included
- 2012–13 Michigan Wolverines men's basketball team -
- 2012–13 Detroit Titans men's basketball team - Under head coach Ray McCallum, the team compiled a 20–13 record.
- 2012–13 Michigan State Spartans women's basketball team -
- 2012–13 Michigan Wolverines women's basketball team -

=== Ice hockey ===
- 2012–13 Detroit Red Wings season –
- 2012–13 Michigan Wolverines men's ice hockey team - In their 26th season under head coach Red Berenson, the Wolverines compiled an 18–19–3 record.
- 2012–13 Michigan State Spartans men's ice hockey team - Under head coach Tom Anastos, the Spartans compiled a 17–24–3 record.

=== Racing ===
- Port Huron to Mackinac Boat Race -
- Pure Michigan 400 -
- Detroit Grand Prix -

=== Other ===
- Michigan Open -

== Chronology of events ==
=== May ===
- May 7 - Democrat Jim Ananich is elected to the Michigan Senate in a special election triggered by the resignation of John J. Gleason.

=== November ===
- November 5 - Democrat Phil Phelps is elected to the Michigan House of Representatives in a special election triggered by the resignation of Jim Ananich.

== Deaths ==
- January 4 - Pete Elliott, University of Michigan football player (1945–1948), at age 86 in Canton, Ohio
- January 31 - George Z. Hart, Michigan state senator (1979–1982, 1987–2002), at age 88
- March 8 - George Saimes, Michigan State football player, at age 71 in Canton, Ohio
- August 20 - Elmore Leonard, crime fiction writer, at age 87 in Bloomfield Hills
- December 10 - Don Lund, baseball player for University of Michigan and Detroit Tigers (1949, 1952–1954), at age 90 in Ann Arbor
- December 30 - Johnny Orr, Michigan basketball coach (1968–1980), at age 86 in Des Moines, Iowa

=== Gallery of 2013 deaths ===
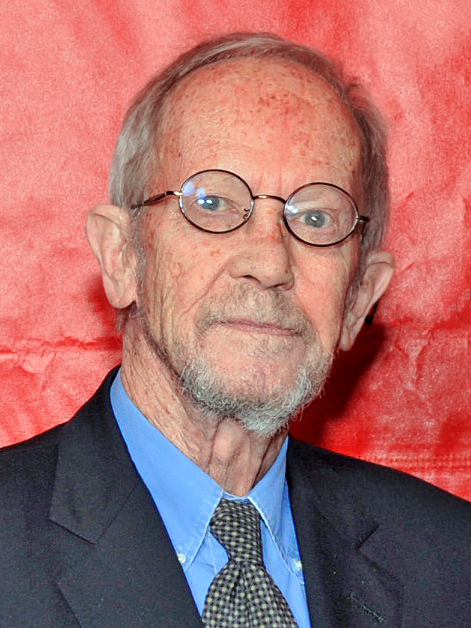
Elmore Leonard

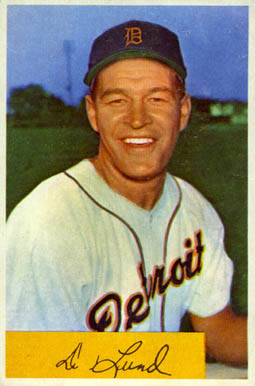
Don Lund

== See also ==
- History of Michigan
- History of Detroit
