= E. J. Harrison =

E. J. Harrison may refer to:

- E. J. Harrison (basketball) (born 1976), American professional basketball player in the British Basketball League
- E. J. Harrison (golfer) (1910–1982), American professional golfer, commonly known as Dutch Harrison
- Ernest John Harrison (1873-1961), British journalist, author & judoka
