= E. J. Davis =

E.J. Davis may refer to:

- Edmund J. Davis, an American lawyer, soldier, and politician in Texas
- Elihu James Davis, a businessman and political figure in Ontario, Canada
- Elgin Davis, a former professional American football running back
