= E. J. Salcines =

American lawyer

E. J. Salcines is a former lawyer, judge, and state attorney in Tampa, Florida. Salcines is also an oral historian.

His father was Emiliano Salcines for whom Salcines Park in West Tampa is named. His parents immigrated to the U.S. from Spain. His father raised bond funds during World War II.

Salcines studied law at Stetson University before being kicked out due to racial prejudices of one of his law professors at the time. He continued his studies at South Texas College of Law in Houston, Texas. He was admitted to the Florida Bar on November 15, 1963, a week before John F. Kennedy's assassination.

There is a statue of judge E. J. Salcines in downtown Tampa on the site of the Old Courthouse.

At the dedication of a bench sculpture at the West Tampa Library he recalled doing his schoolwork upstairs at the library and smelling Alessi Bakery nearby.

He has been a mentor to many in Tampa's Latino community as well as other judges and politicians.

He also served as Assistant United States Attorney. Salcines was accused of case fixing. U.S. Attorney Bob Merkle led the investigation and Salcines was represented by Barry Cohen.
