= E. J. Lawrence =

American football player and coach (1877–1947)

Biographical details
- Born: February 23, 1877; Norwalk, Ohio, U.S.
- Died: June 19, 1947 (aged 70); Cleveland, Ohio, U.S.

Playing career
- 1900–1901: Williams
- Positions: Guard, halfback

Coaching career (HC unless noted)
- 1903: Western Reserve

Head coaching record
- Overall: 3–6

Everton Jay Lawrence (February 23, 1877 – June 19, 1947) was an American football player and coach. Lawrence was born in Norwalk, Ohio and played college football at Williams College from 1900 to 1901, before graduating in 1902. He served as the head football coach at Western Reserve University—now known as Case Western Reserve University, during the 1903 college football season, compiling a 3–6 record.

Lawrence married Julia Frances Klumph.

== Head coaching record ==
Year	Team	Overall	Conference	Standing	Bowl/playoffs
Western Reserve (Independent) (1903)
1903	Western Reserve	3–6			
Western Reserve:		3–6			
Total:		3–6			
