= E. J. Lowe =

E. J. Lowe may refer to:

- Edward Joseph Lowe (1825–1900), British botanist, meteorologist and astronomer
- E. J. Lowe (philosopher) (1950–2014), British philosopher
