= EJay =

Musical arrangement software and video games

eJay
- North American PlayStation 2 version cover art featuring the real-world clubs on the left side of the cover, The End, Amnesia, U60311, Zouk, and The Queen are among some of the clubs featured in the game.
- Developers: Empire Interactive; Unique Development Software (PlayStation 2); Yelsi AG
- Publishers: EU: Empire Interactive; NA: Crave Entertainment, Ingram Entertainment
- Series: eJay
- Platforms: Microsoft Windows; PlayStation 2
- Release: EU: August 30, 2002; NA: July 30, 2003; (PlayStation 2)
- Genre: Music
- Modes: Single-player, multiplayer (PlayStation 2)

eJay is a series of musical arrangement software, and video games, primarily for Microsoft Windows. The first edition, Dance eJay, was released in 1997. It supports eight tracks of audio and, as with its successors, permits the arrangement of sound bites by a drag-and-drop interface. Since the original Dance eJay, there have been many releases catering to different music genres and users, including techno and hip-hop, as well as a PlayStation 2 edition called eJay Clubworld.

In the PlayStation 2 edition, Carl Cox is featured in the game and gives an introduction during the opening FMV sequence with a quick start guide on how to put together a mix while travelling to the real-world clubs to be a special guest DJ and showing off what the clubs are like at the locations and what genres of music they play at the clubs. There are genres of music to choose from which correspond to a club in a particular real-world location (hence the subtitle Clubworld) that plays that particular genre of music even though in the real world the clubs are not necessarily restricted to just one genre of music, but the clubs play many different genres of music, for example in the game in Brooklyn, New York City, New York, The United States of America, the club would be called Brooklyn and the club would play hip hop music, in the real world, New York is where hip hop music was born, but in another Borough of the city called Bronxville (The Bronx) in 1973 and the player would make and play back hip hop music should the player select the club/genre. Each genre of music has a theme of a real-world club.

In May 2009, a note posted to eJay's official Facebook page stated that Empire Interactive Europe Limited, the company that owned and developed the eJay products, was in administration.

On October 15, 2010, three eJay products were reissued in editions: Hip Hop 5, Dance 6 and DJ Mixstation 4, with Hip Hop 5 and Dance 6 now having twice the number of sound samples than they had originally (10,000 instead of 5,000). Also on the same date, a new software called Video & Music Exchange was released.

Currently eJay is a registered trademark of Yelsi AG.
