= E. J. Flanagan =

American politician

E. J. Flanagan (1883 – July 10, 1957), from Wapato, Washington, was a member of the Washington State Senate.

== Biography ==
Flanagan was born in Wisconsin in 1883. He would become a rancher.

== Political career ==
Flanagan was a member of the Senate from 1943 to 1947. He was a Republican. Poor health forced Flanagan to resign from office in the winter of 1956, and he died the following year in Yakima, Washington.
