= Ellsworth Jerome Hill =

American Presbyterian minister and botanist (1833–1917)

Ellsworth Jerome Hill (1833 in Le Roy, New York – 1917) was a Presbyterian minister and an American botanist. He conducted identifications and classifications of new American species.

The standard author abbreviation E.J.Hill is used to indicate this person as the author when citing a botanical name.
