= E. J. Potter =

American dragstrip exponent (1941–2012)

- Born: April 24, 1941; Ithaca, Michigan, U.S.
- Died: April 30, 2012 (aged 71); Ithaca, Michigan, U.S.
- Occupation: Stunt performer
- Known for: Motorcycle stunts

E. J. Potter (April 24, 1941 – April 30, 2012), also known as the Michigan Madman, was an American dragstrip exhibition proponent. Writing his obituary in 2012, Paul Vitello of the New York Times described him as a "legend".

== Life and career ==
Born in Ithaca, Michigan, Elon Jack Potter grew up on a farm repairing tractor engines, which led to building motorcycles. In high school, he wondered if he could build a bike with a V8 engine. The bike he built, named "Bloody Mary", was tested at a local strip and reached 130 mph (210 km/h).

Potter later built a three-wheeled motorcycle with a United States military surplus rocket engine. "The Widowmaker" set three world land speed records. Potter's other creations include putting a jet engine in a Motorized tricycle and putting WWII airplane engines into tractors for tractor pull competitions.

Beginning soon after his high school graduation, Potter toured the drag racing circuit for 13 years with his creations.

Potter died from complications of Alzheimer's disease in Ithaca, Michigan, on April 30, 2012, at the age of 71.

== Legacy ==
In 2017, Potter's 1971 Widowmaker 7 went up for auction in Las Vegas. Potter's motorcycles were featured on an episode of American Pickers in 2019.
