= Alan Mulally =

American businessman (born 1945)

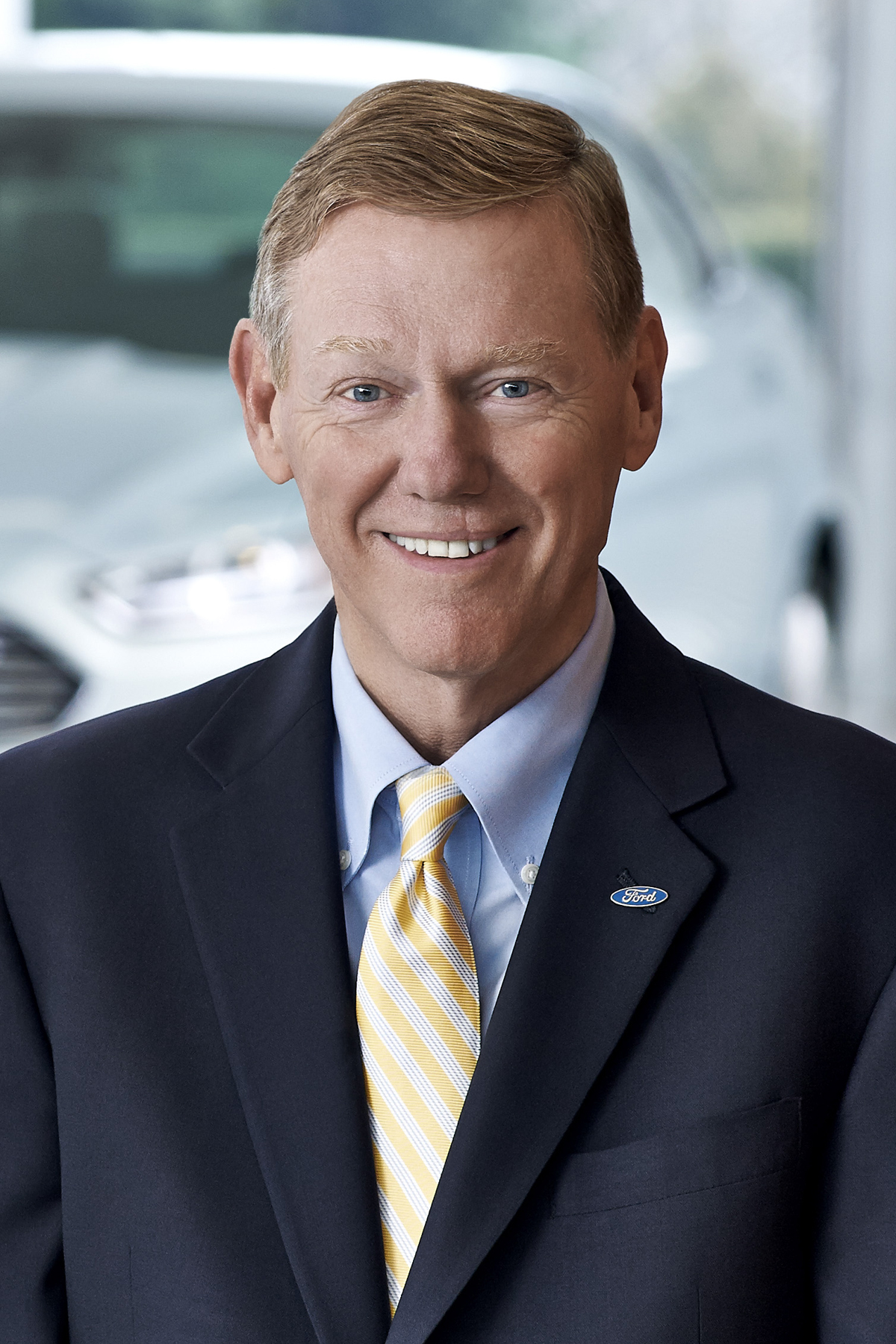
- Mulally in 2013
- Born: Alan Roger Mulally; August 4, 1945 (age 81); Oakland, California, U.S.
- Education: University of Kansas (BS) (MS); Massachusetts Institute of Technology (MSM)
- Known for: President and CEO of Ford Motor Company (2006‍–‍2014); CEO of Boeing Commercial Airplanes (1998‍–‍2006)
- Spouse: Nicki Mulally
- Children: 5

Alan Roger Mulally (born August 4, 1945) is an American aerospace engineer and manufacturing executive. He was the CEO of Boeing Commercial Airplanes from 1998 to 2006, and later as president and chief executive officer of the Ford Motor Company from 2006 to 2014.

He began his career with Boeing as an engineer in 1969 and was largely credited with Boeing's resurgence against Airbus in the mid-2000s. Mulally is also widely credited with turning around Ford during the Great Recession, when American competitors were declared bankrupt and were bailed out by the federal government. Mulally's achievements at Ford are chronicled in the book American Icon: Alan Mulally and the Fight to Save Ford Motor Company by Bryce G. Hoffman, published in 2012. On July 15, 2014, he was appointed to the Board of Directors of Google, a position which he had left by 2024.

In 2015, Mulally was inducted into the International Air & Space Hall of Fame at the San Diego Air & Space Museum.

== Early life ==
Mulally was born in Oakland, California, the son of Lauraine Lizette (Clark) and Charles R. Mulally, who met at a USO dance. Mulally grew up in his mother's hometown of Lawrence, Kansas, where he was a member of Plymouth Congregational Church. He considered Rev. Dale Turner "a mentor and an inspiration". He used to sit at the front of the church to study the minister's influence on the congregation. Mulally said that he found himself motivated at the age of 17 by president John F. Kennedy's challenge to send a man to the moon.

=== Education ===
Mulally graduated from the University of Kansas, also his mother's alma mater, with Bachelor of Science (1968) and Master of Science (1969) degrees in aeronautical and astronautical engineering. He was also a member of Kappa Sigma fraternity. He received a Master's degree in Management (S.M.) as a Sloan Fellow from MIT's Sloan School of Management in 1982.

== Career ==
=== Boeing ===
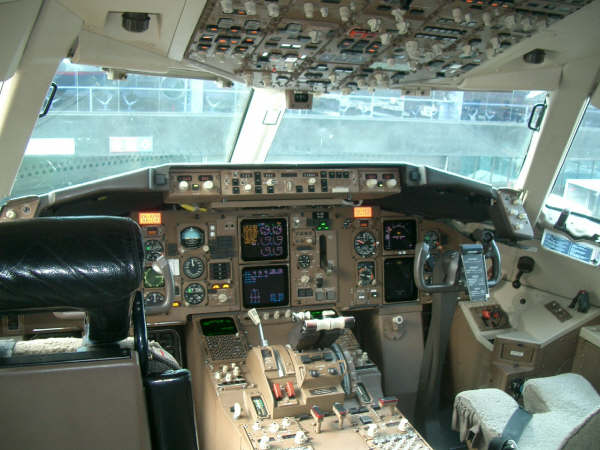
Mulally led the design team of the first all-digital flight deck in a commercial aircraft, as seen here in the cockpit of the Boeing 767.

Mulally was hired by Boeing immediately out of college in 1969 as an engineer. He held a number of engineering and program management positions, making contributions to the Boeing 727, 737, 747, 757, 767, and Boeing 777 projects. He led the cockpit design team on the 757/767 project. Its revolutionary design featured the first all-digital flight deck in a commercial aircraft, the second two-man crew for long range aircraft after the Airbus A300, and a common type rating for pilots on two different aircraft. He worked on the 777 program first as director of engineering and, from September 1992, as vice president and general manager.

He was later named as vice president of Engineering for the commercial airplane group. He is known and recognized for elevating Phil Condit's "Working Together" philosophy through and beyond the 777 program. In 1994, Mulally was promoted to senior vice president of Airplane Development and was in charge of all airplane development activities, flight test operations, certification, and government technical liaison. In 1997, Mulally became the president of the Boeing Information, Space & Defense Systems and senior vice president. He held this position until 1998 when he was made president of Boeing Commercial Airplanes; chief executive officer duties were added in 2001.

Following the forced resignations of CEOs Phil Condit in 2003 and Harry Stonecipher in 2005 of parent The Boeing Company, Mulally was considered one of the leading internal candidates for the position. When Mulally was passed over in both instances, questions were raised about whether he would remain with the company.

For Mulally's performance at Boeing, Aviation Week & Space Technology named him as person of the year for 2006.

=== Ford Motor Company ===
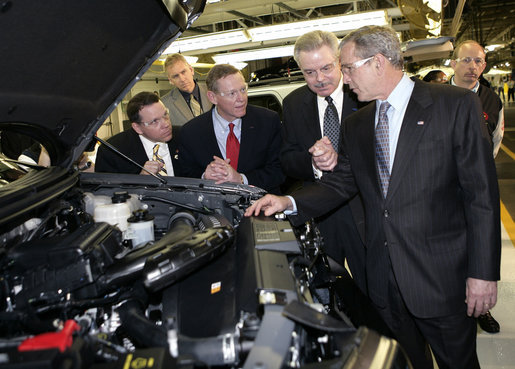
Mulally (wearing the red tie) with President George W. Bush at the Kansas City Assembly Plant in Claycomo, Missouri on March 20, 2007, touring Ford's new hybrid cars

"An automobile has about 10,000 moving parts, right? An airplane has two million, and it has to stay up in the air." (on being asked "How are you going to tackle something as complex and unfamiliar as the auto business when we are in such tough financial shape?")

— Alan Mulally, 2007

Former Ford CEO Donald Petersen recommended Mulally to Ford, and he was named the president and CEO of Ford Motor Company on September 5, 2006, succeeding Bill Ford, who became executive chairman. Mulally called his Lexus LS430 the 'finest car in the world', just as Ford was about to announce his selection as CEO, making the point that Mulally was not then in a leadership position, though he then faced some criticism and switched to driving Ford models. William Clay Ford Jr. had been searching for his successor as Ford CEO for some time, with Daimler AG's Dieter Zetsche and Renault/Nissan Motors's Carlos Ghosn both turning down the offer.

One of Mulally's first decisions at Ford was to bring back the Taurus nameplate. He said that he could not understand why the company previously scrapped the Taurus, which had been one of the company's best sellers until losing ground in the late 1990s.

Mulally took over "The Way Forward" restructuring plan at Ford to turn around its massive losses and declining market share. Mulally's cost-cutting initiatives led to the company's first profitable quarter in two years. Dividends to shareholders were also suspended.

In 2006, Mulally led the effort for Ford to borrow US$23.6 billion by mortgaging all of Ford's assets. Mulally said that he intended to use the money to finance a major overhaul and provide "a cushion to protect for a recession or other unexpected event". At the time, the loan was interpreted as a sign of desperation, but is now widely credited with stabilizing Ford's financial position, compared to crosstown rivals General Motors and Chrysler, both of whom subsequently went bankrupt during the automotive industry crisis of 2008–2009. Ford was the only one of the Detroit Three that did not ask for a government loan. Mulally did testify before the United States Congress in favor of government loans for General Motors and Chrysler, discussing the impact to the economy and to other automobile manufacturers if parts suppliers were to go bankrupt in the light of a GM or Chrysler collapse. In May 2009, Ford chairman William Clay Ford, who hired Mulally, said that "Alan was the right choice [to be CEO], and it gets more right every day".

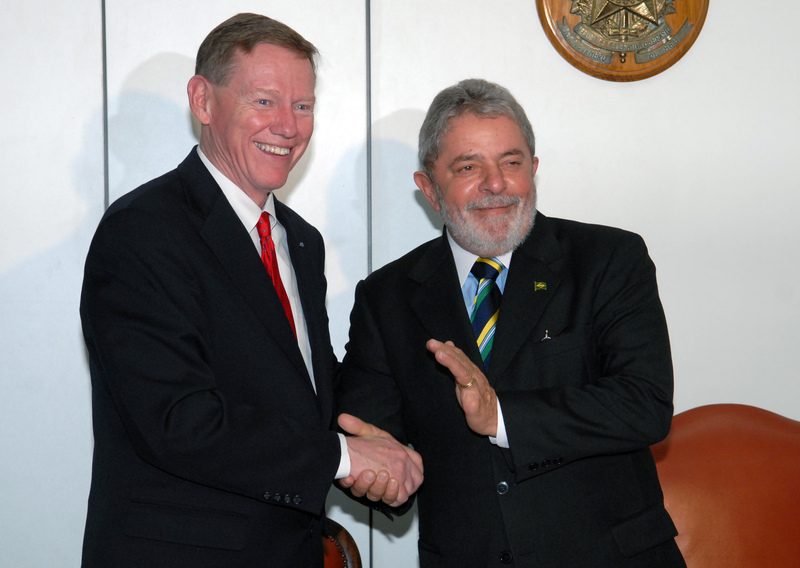
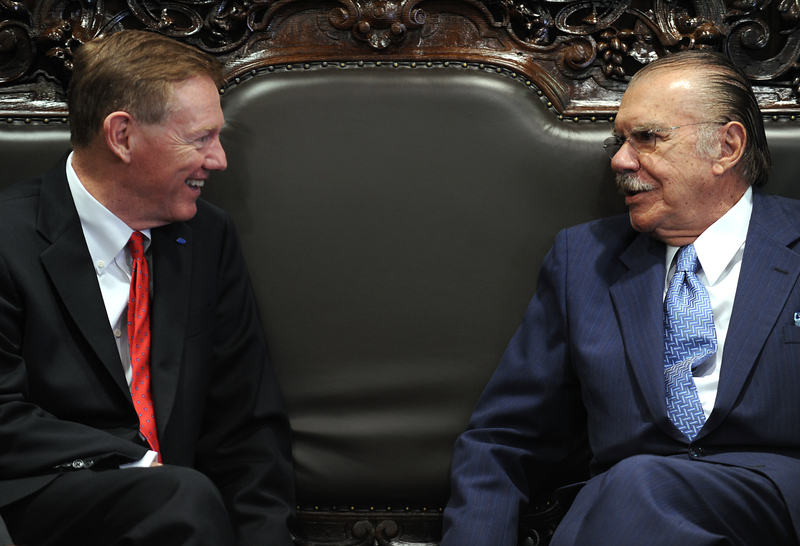
Mulally in Brazil with former President Lula da Silva (top) and former President of the Senate José Sarney (bottom) in April 2010

In 2007, he presided over the sale of Jaguar Cars and Land Rover to Tata Motors, an Indian car and truck manufacturer. Mulally said he had "no regrets" over the sale, preferring to concentrate on the Ford brand, as then-CEO Jacques Nasser was criticized in 2001 for paying too much attention to new overseas acquisitions while letting the main Ford operations in the U.S. decline. Ford received US$2.3 billion on the sale, considerably below what they paid for it under Nasser and Donald Petersen. However, analysts said that Ford would have gotten much less or might not have found a buyer if they had tried to sell it later in 2008, as Jaguar Land Rover sales subsequently plummeted due to high oil prices in the summer, causing Tata to request a bailout from the British government. Mulally also sold off Aston Martin and Volvo Cars, and reduced Ford's stake in Mazda.

In 2008, amid mounting losses during an economic downturn, Ford announced a proposal on December 2, 2008, to cut Mulally's salary to $1 per year if government loans were received and used by Ford. During hearings for government loans to Ford, he and other industry leaders were criticized for flying to Washington, D.C. in corporate jets. During a subsequent meeting, he traveled from Detroit to Washington by a Ford-built hybrid electric vehicle, while selling all but one of the company's corporate jets.

In 2008, Mulally earned a total compensation of $13,565,378, which included a base salary of $2,000,000, stock awards of $1,849,241, and option awards of $8,669,747. His total compensation decreased by 37.4% compared to 2007.

Due to his achievements at Ford, he was included in the 2009 Time 100 list. The entry, written by Steve Ballmer, says, "[Mulally] understands the fundamentals of business success as well as any business leader I know".

In 2011, Mulally was named Person of the Year by the Financial Times ArcelorMittal Boldness in Business Awards. He was also named the 2011 CEO of the Year by Chief Executive magazine. In 2011, Mulally was also honored with an Edison Achievement Award for his commitment to innovation throughout his career.

In 2012, Mulally was awarded the honorary degree of Doctor of Science by the University of Kansas for his notable contributions to engineering and the transportation industry.

On November 1, 2012, Ford announced that Mulally would stay with the company at least through 2014. It was reported in September 2013 that Mulally might step down earlier than 2014 as he explored other roles. The board would reportedly be sympathetic to this move. He ultimately retired on July 1, 2014, and succeeded by Mark Fields.

=== Post-Ford ===
There were rumors in the latter part of 2013 that he was a front-runner to replace Steve Ballmer as CEO of Seattle-based Microsoft. However he ruled himself out of that role in January 2014. On July 9, 2014, he joined the Board of Directors of Google (now Alphabet). Mulally became a senior fellow at Seattle University's Albers School of Business in April 2016.

Mulally was considered for Secretary of State in the first Trump administration but that job went to ExxonMobil CEO Rex Tillerson.

== Management style ==
Everybody says you can't make money off small cars. Well, you'd better damn well figure out how to make money because that's where the world is going.

— Alan Mulally, 2008

Mulally negotiated four new agreements with the United Auto Workers, which brought down labor costs from $76/hour to $55/hour.

He lived within three miles of his office at Ford's global headquarters in Dearborn, Michigan. He had a meeting with Ford's executives, called a "Business Plan Review" (BPR) every Thursday at 7 a.m. in the "Thunderbird Room" at Ford's headquarters. At a "town meeting" of 100 information technology staffers in February 2007, Mulally said, "We have been going out of business for 40 years", and repeated his message to other employee groups.

== Self-management ==
McKinsey & Company asked Mulally how he maintained his mental and physical stamina, to which he responded: "Everybody always talks about how you need to manage your time. You need to manage your energy as well. You first have to ask, 'What gives me energy?' There can be lots of sources: your family, exercise, your spiritual well-being... In our house, we had a family meeting every week—the family BPR ["Business Plan Review"]—where we reviewed what we needed to do and the support required to get us through the week. It is another kind of process step, and a really important one."

Business positions
Preceded by William Clay Ford Jr.	Chief executive officer of the Ford Motor Company; 2006–2014	Succeeded by Mark Fields
Preceded by Ron Woodard	President/CEO of Boeing Commercial Airplanes; 1998–2006	Succeeded by Scott Carson
