= American Icon =

American Icon may refer to:

- American Icon: Alan Mulally and the Fight to Save Ford Motor Company, a 2012 book by Bryce G. Hoffman
- American Icon: The Fall of Roger Clemens and the Rise of Steroids in America's Pastime, a 2009 book by Teri Thompson, Nathaniel Vinton, Michael O'Keeffe, and Christian Red
