= 2017 in Michigan =

- Decades: 1990s; 2000s; 2010s; 2020s
- See also: History of Michigan; Historical outline of Michigan; List of years in Michigan; 2017 in the United States

Events from the year 2017 in Michigan.

The state's top news stories of 2017 included continuing political fallout and criminal charges in connection with the Flint water crisis; Larry Nassar and the USA Gymnastics sex abuse scandal; the December 5 retirement of John Conyers amid claims of sexual harassment; the re-election of Mike Duggan to a second term as Mayor of Detroit with 72% of the vote; and the revitalization of Downtown and Midtown Detroit.

In sports, the state's top stories included the return of the Detroit Pistons to Detroit; the opening of Little Caesars Arena as the home of the Pistons and Detroit Red Wings; the election of three former Detroit Tigers (Iván Rodríguez, Alan Trammell, and Jack Morris) to the Baseball Hall of Fame; the firing of Jim Caldwell as head coach of the Detroit Lions and Brad Ausmus as head coach of the Tigers; and Claressa Shields of Flint winning female middleweight and super middleweight boxing titles.

== Office holders ==
=== State office holders ===
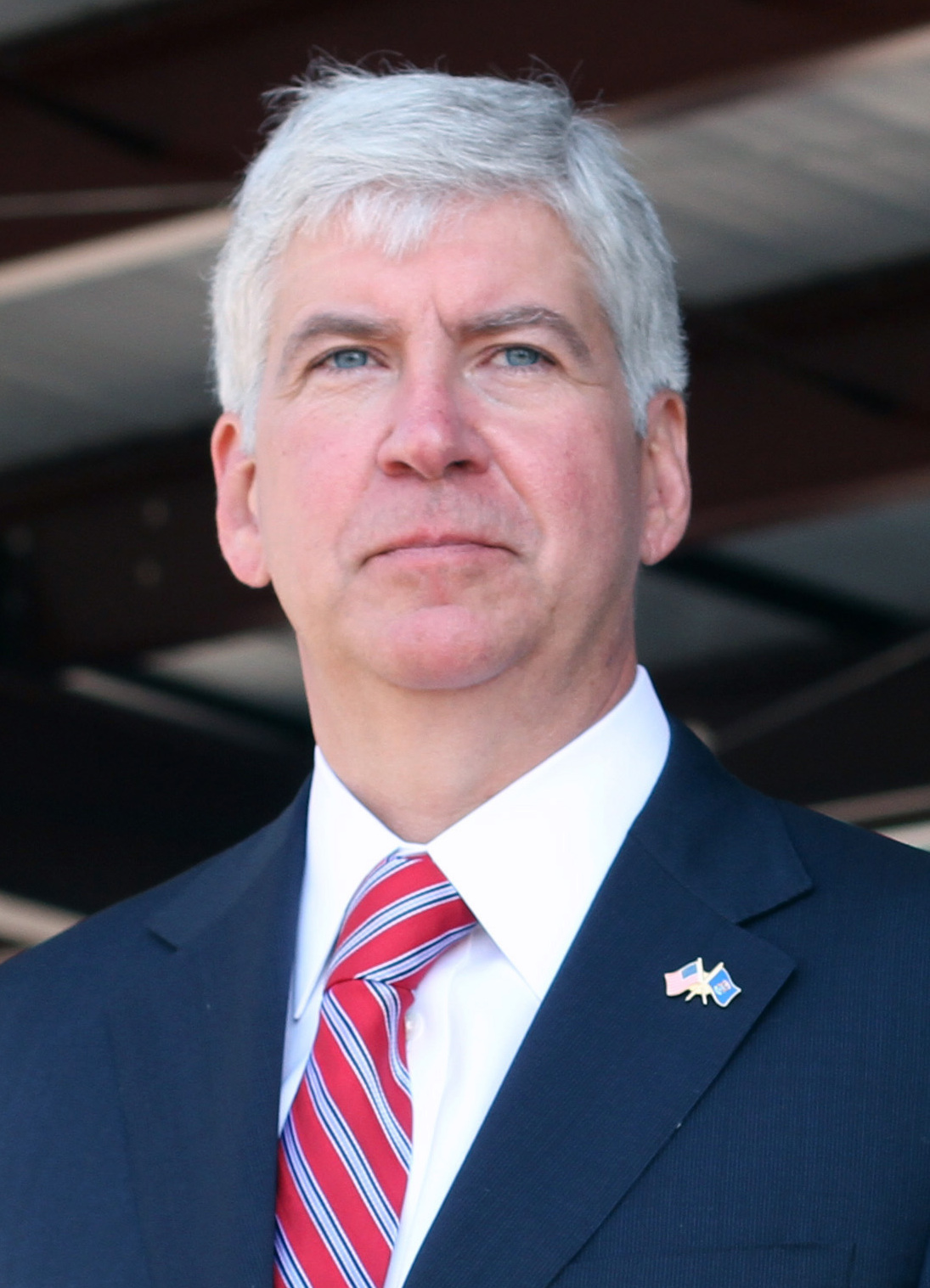
Rick Snyder

- Governor of Michigan: Rick Snyder (Republican)
- Lieutenant Governor of Michigan: Brian Calley (Republican)
- Michigan Attorney General: Bill Schuette (Republican)
- Michigan Secretary of State: Ruth Johnson (Republican)
- Speaker of the Michigan House of Representatives: Kevin Cotter (Republican) (until January 11), Tom Leonard (Republican) (starting January 11)
- Majority Leader of the Michigan Senate: Arlan Meekhof (Republican)
- Chief Justice, Michigan Supreme Court: Robert P. Young, Jr. (until January 6), Stephen Markman (starting January 6)

=== Mayors of major cities ===
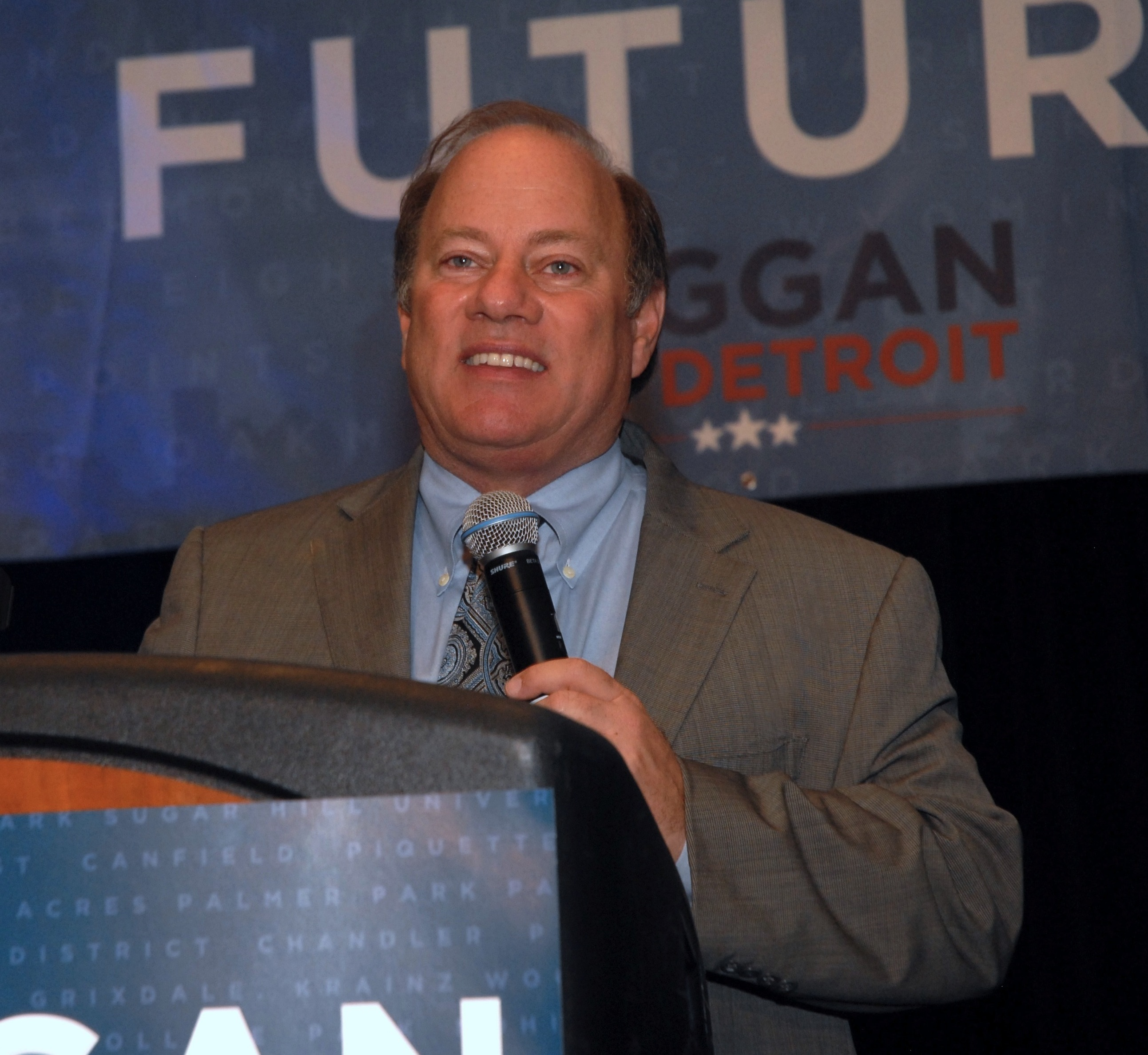
Mike Duggan

- Mayor of Detroit: Mike Duggan (Democrat)
- Mayor of Grand Rapids: Rosalynn Bliss
- Mayor of Warren, Michigan: James R. Fouts
- Mayor of Sterling Heights, Michigan: Michael C. Taylor
- Mayor of Ann Arbor: Christopher Taylor (Democrat)
- Mayor of Dearborn: John B. O'Reilly Jr.
- Mayor of Lansing: Virgil Bernero
- Mayor of Flint: Karen Weaver
- Mayor of Saginaw: Dennis Browning

=== Federal office holders ===
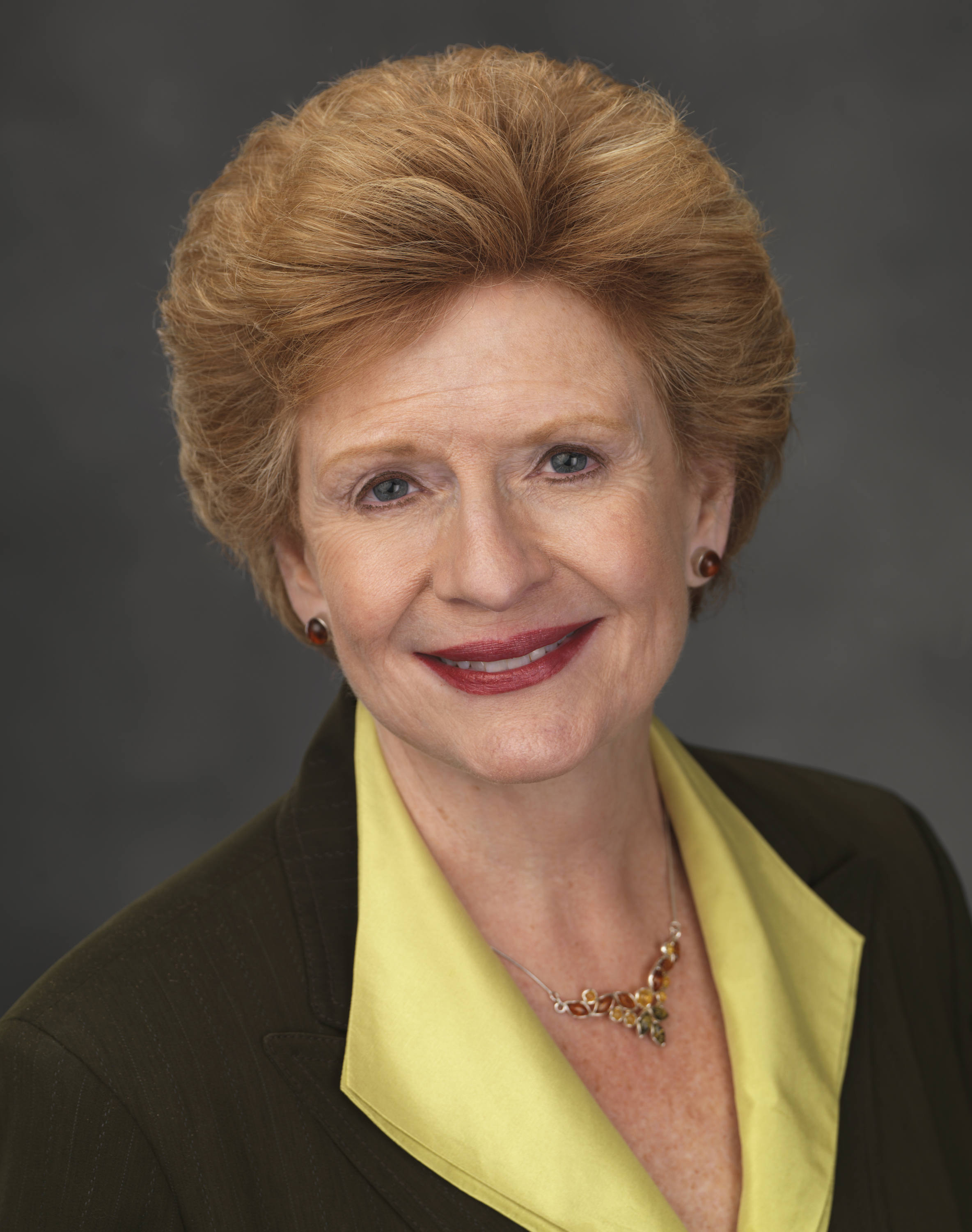
Debbie Stabenow

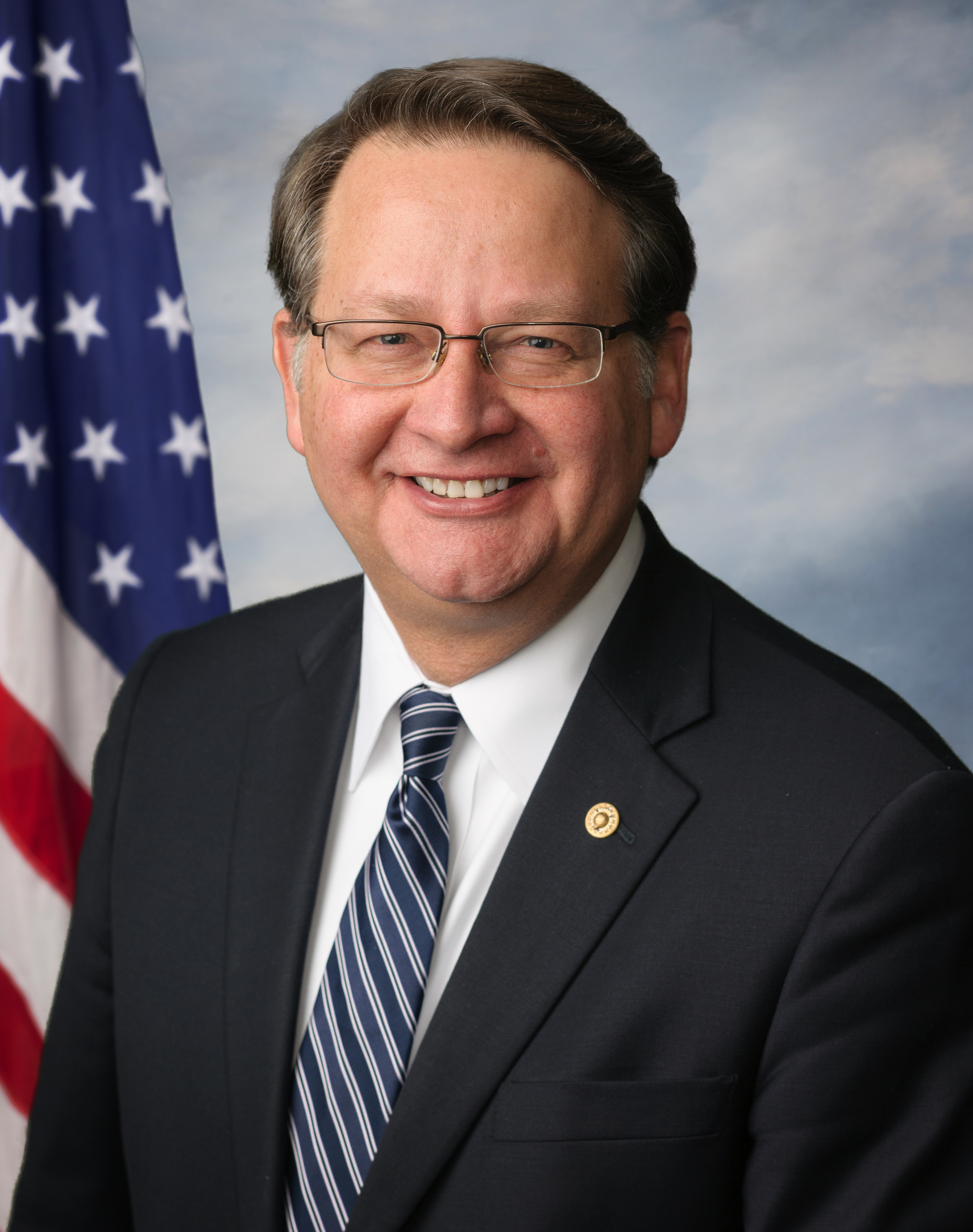
Gary Peters

- U.S. Senator from Michigan: Debbie Stabenow (Democrat)
- U.S. Senator from Michigan: Gary Peters (Democrat)
- House District 1: Jack Bergman (Republican)
- House District 2: Bill Huizenga (Republican)
- House District 3: Justin Amash (Republican)
- House District 4: John Moolenaar (Republican)
- House District 5: Dan Kildee (Democrat)
- House District 6: Fred Upton (Republican)
- House District 7: Tim Walberg (Republican)
- House District 8: Mike Bishop (Republican)
- House District 9: Sander Levin (Democrat)
- House District 10: Paul Mitchell (Republican)
- House District 11: David Trott (Republican)
- House District 12: Debbie Dingell (Democrat)
- House District 13: John Conyers (Democrat)
- House District 14: Brenda Lawrence (Democrat)

== Population ==
In the 2010 United States Census, Michigan was recorded as having a population of 9,883,640 persons, ranking as the eighth most populous state in the country. By 2017, the state's population was estimated at 9,962,311, and the state had become the 10th most populous state.

The state's largest cities, having populations of at least 75,000 based on 2016 estimates, were as follows:

2017 Rank	City	County	2010 Pop.	2016 Pop.	Change 2010-16
1	Detroit	Wayne	713,777	672,795	−5.7% ▼
2	Grand Rapids	Kent	188,040	196,445	4.5% ▲
3	Warren	Macomb	134,056	135,125	0.8% ▲
4	Sterling Heights	Macomb	129,699	132,427	2.1% ▲
5	Ann Arbor	Washtenaw	113,934	120,782	6.0% ▲
6	Lansing	Ingham	114,297	116,020	1.5% ▲
7	Flint	Genesee	102,434	97,386	−4.9% ▼
8	Dearborn	Wayne	98,153	94,444	−3.8% ▼
9	Livonia	Wayne	96,942	94,041	−3.0% ▼
10	Troy	Oakland	80,980	83,641	3.3% ▲
11	Westland	Wayne	84,094	81,545	−3.0% ▼
12	Farmington Hills	Oakland	79,740	81,129	1.7% ▲
13	Kalamazoo	Kalamazoo	74,262	75,984	2.3% ▲
14	Wyoming	Kent	72,125	75,567	4.8% ▲

== Sports ==
=== Baseball ===
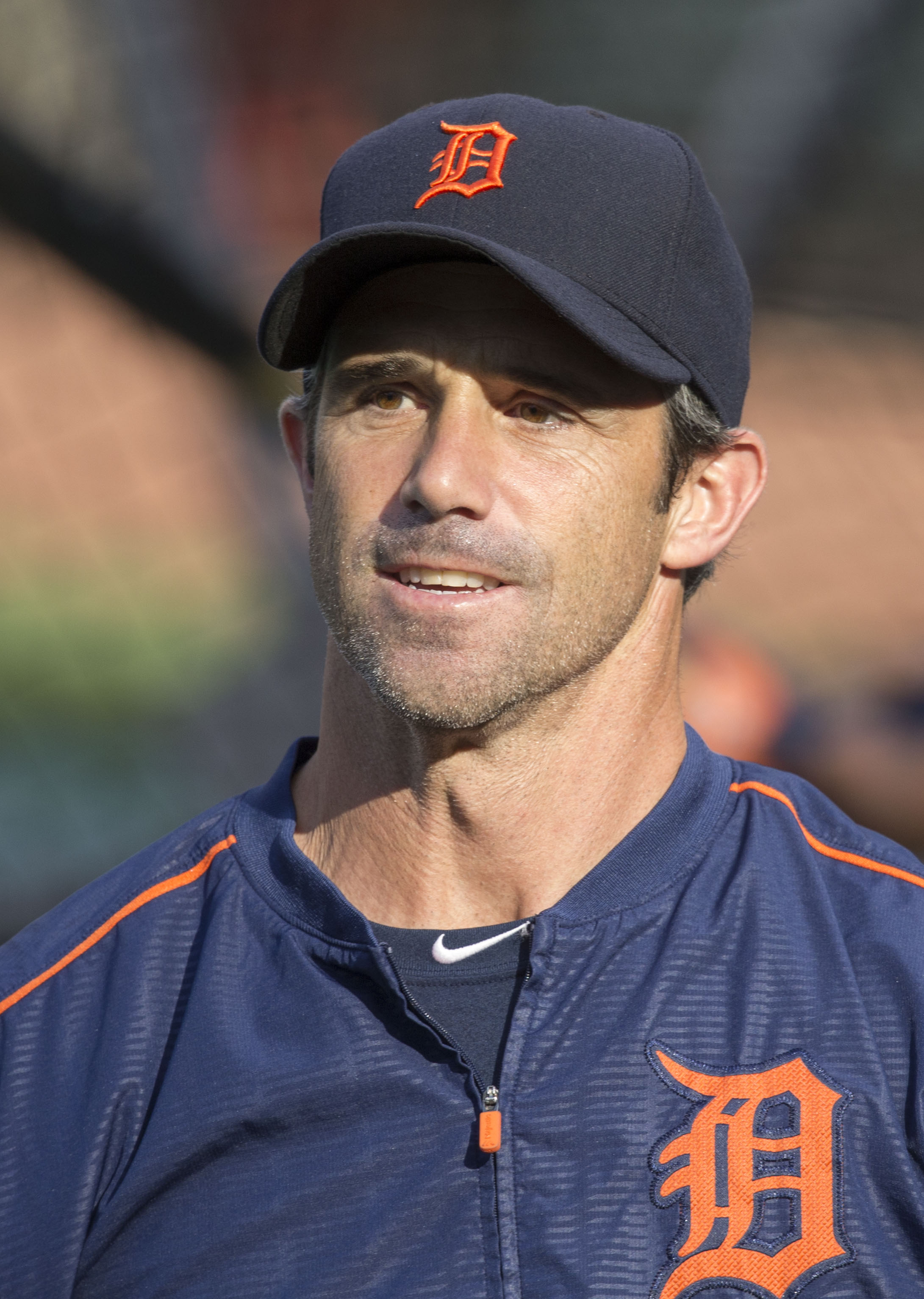
Brad Ausmus

- 2017 Detroit Tigers season – Under manager Brad Ausmus, the Tigers compiled a 64–98 record and finished fifth in American League Central Division. The team's statistical leaders included Justin Upton with a .279 batting average and 28 home runs, Nicholas Castellanos with 101 RBIs, Justin Verlander and Michael Fulmer with 10 wins each, and Shane Greene with a 2.66 earned run average.
- Baseball Hall of Fame - Three Detroit Tigers were elected to the Baseball Hall of Fame. Iván Rodríguez was elected in January by the Baseball Writers' Association of America, and Alan Trammell and Jack Morris were elected by the Modern Era Committee in December.
- 2017 West Michigan Whitecaps season - The Whitecaps, a Class A Minor League Baseball team affiliated with the Detroit Tigers, compiled a 91–45 record.
- 2017 Michigan Wolverines baseball team - Under head coach Erik Bakich, the Wolverines compiled a 42–7 record and finished second in the Big Ten Conference.
- 2017 Michigan State Spartans baseball team - Under head coach Jake Boss, the Spartans compiled a 29–23 record.
- 2017 Michigan Wolverines softball team - Under head coach Carol Hutchins, the Wolverines compiled a 43-13-1 record.

=== American football ===
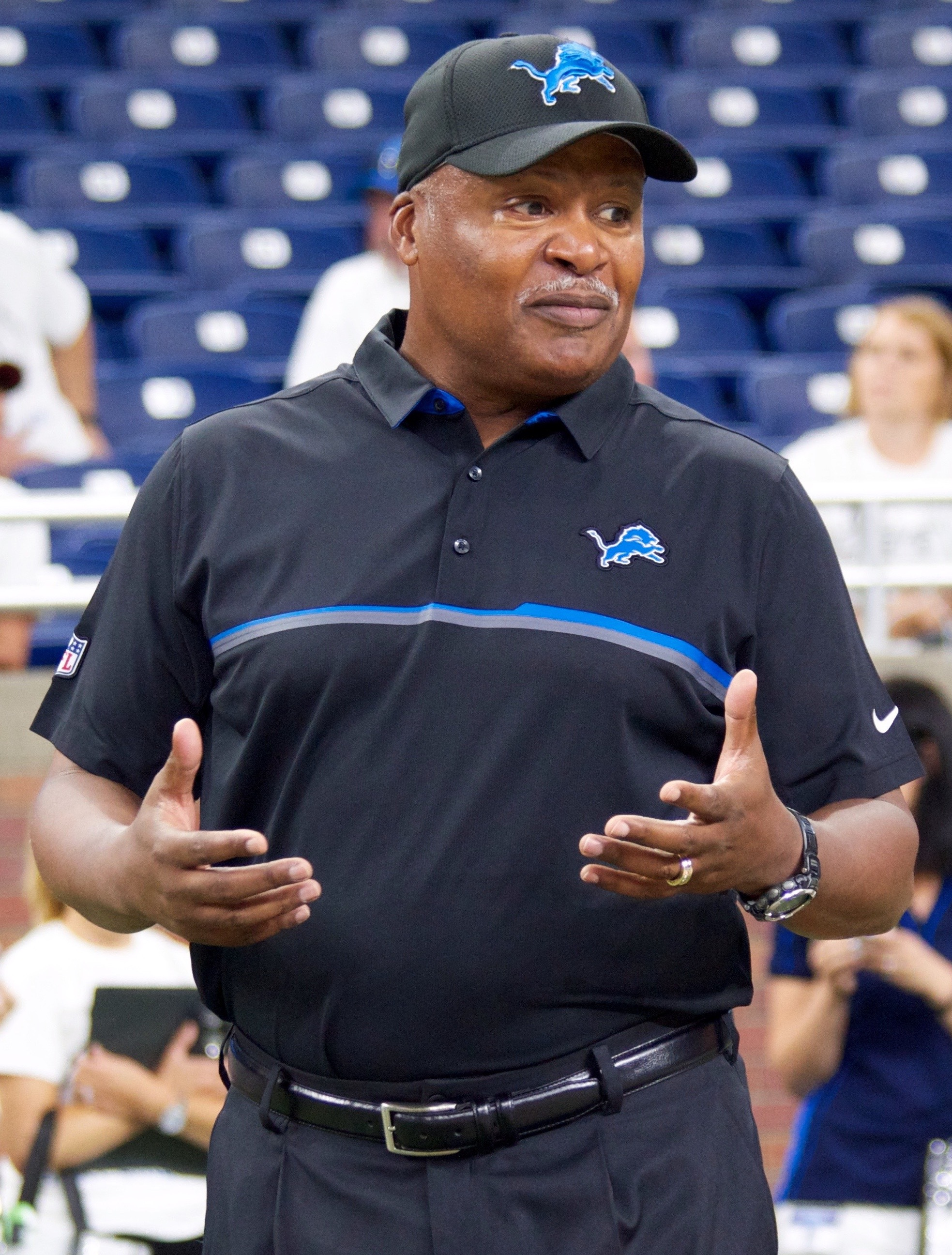
Jim Caldwell

- 2017 Detroit Lions season – Under head coach Jim Caldwell, the Lions compiled a 9–7 record and finished second in the NFC North Division. The team's statistical leaders included Matthew Stafford with 4,446 passing yards, Ameer Abdullah with 551 rushing yards, Marvin Jones Jr. with 1,101 receiving yards, and Matt Prater with 130 points scored.
- 2017 Michigan State Spartans football team - Under head coach Mark Dantonio, the Spartans compiled a 10–3 record, defeated Washington State in the 2017 Holiday Bowl, and were ranked No. 15 in the final AP Poll. The team's statistical leaders included Brian Lewerke with 2,793 passing yards, L. J. Scott with 898 rushing yards, Felton Davis III with 776 receiving yards, and Matt Coghlin with 83 points scored.
- 2017 Michigan Wolverines football team - Under head coach Jim Harbaugh, the team compiled an 8–5 and lost to South Carolina in the 2018 Outback Bowl. The team's statistical leaders included John O'Korn with 973 passing yards, Karan Higdon with 994 rushing yards, Grant Perry with 307 receiving yards, and Quinn Nordin with 94 points scored.
- 2017 Central Michigan Chippewas football team - Under head coach John Bonamego, the Chippewas compiled an 8–5 record and lost to Wyoming in the Famous Idaho Potato Bowl.
- 2017 Western Michigan Broncos football team - Under head coach Tim Lester, the Broncos compiled a 6–6 record.
- 2017 Eastern Michigan Eagles football team - Under head coach Chris Creighton, the Eagles compiled a 5–7 record.

=== Basketball ===
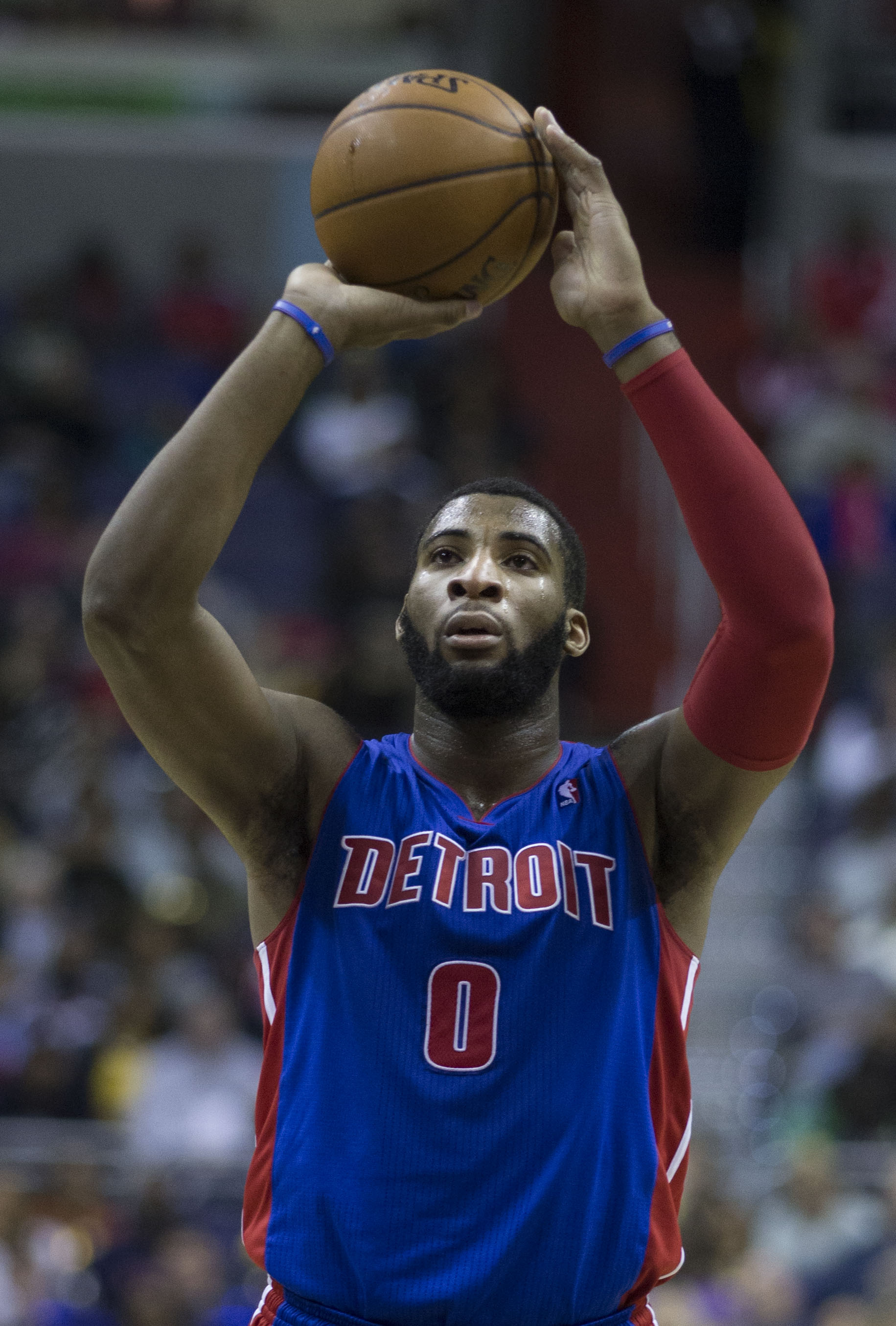
Andre Drummond

- 2016–17 Detroit Pistons season – Under head coach Stan Van Gundy, the Pistons compiled a 37–45 record and finished fifth in the NBA's Central Division. The team's statistical leaders included Tobias Harris with 1,321 points, Ish Smith with 418 assists and Andre Drummond with 1,115 rebounds.
- 2016–17 Michigan Wolverines men's basketball team - Under head coach John Beilein, the Wolverines compiled a 26–12 record, won the Big Ten Tournament championship, and advanced to the Sweet Sixteen round in the 2017 NCAA Division I men's basketball tournament. The team's statistical leaders included Derrick Walton with 589 points and 189 assists and D. J. Wilson with 203 rebounds.
- 2016–17 Michigan State Spartans men's basketball team - Under head coach Tom Izzo, the Spartans compiled a 20–15 record and lost in the second round of the NCAA Tournament. The team's statistical leaders included Nick Ward with 485 points, Cassius Winston with 182 assists, and Miles Bridges with 232 rebounds.
- 2016–17 Detroit Titans men's basketball team - Under head coach Bacari Alexander, the Titans compiled an 8–23 record.
- 2016–17 Michigan Wolverines women's basketball team - Under head coach Kim Barnes, the Wolverines compiled a 28–9 record and won the WNIT championship.
- 2016–17 Michigan State Spartans women's basketball team - Under head coach Suzy Merchant, the Spartans compiled a 21–12 record and lost in the first round of the 2017 NCAA Division I women's basketball tournament.

=== Ice hockey ===
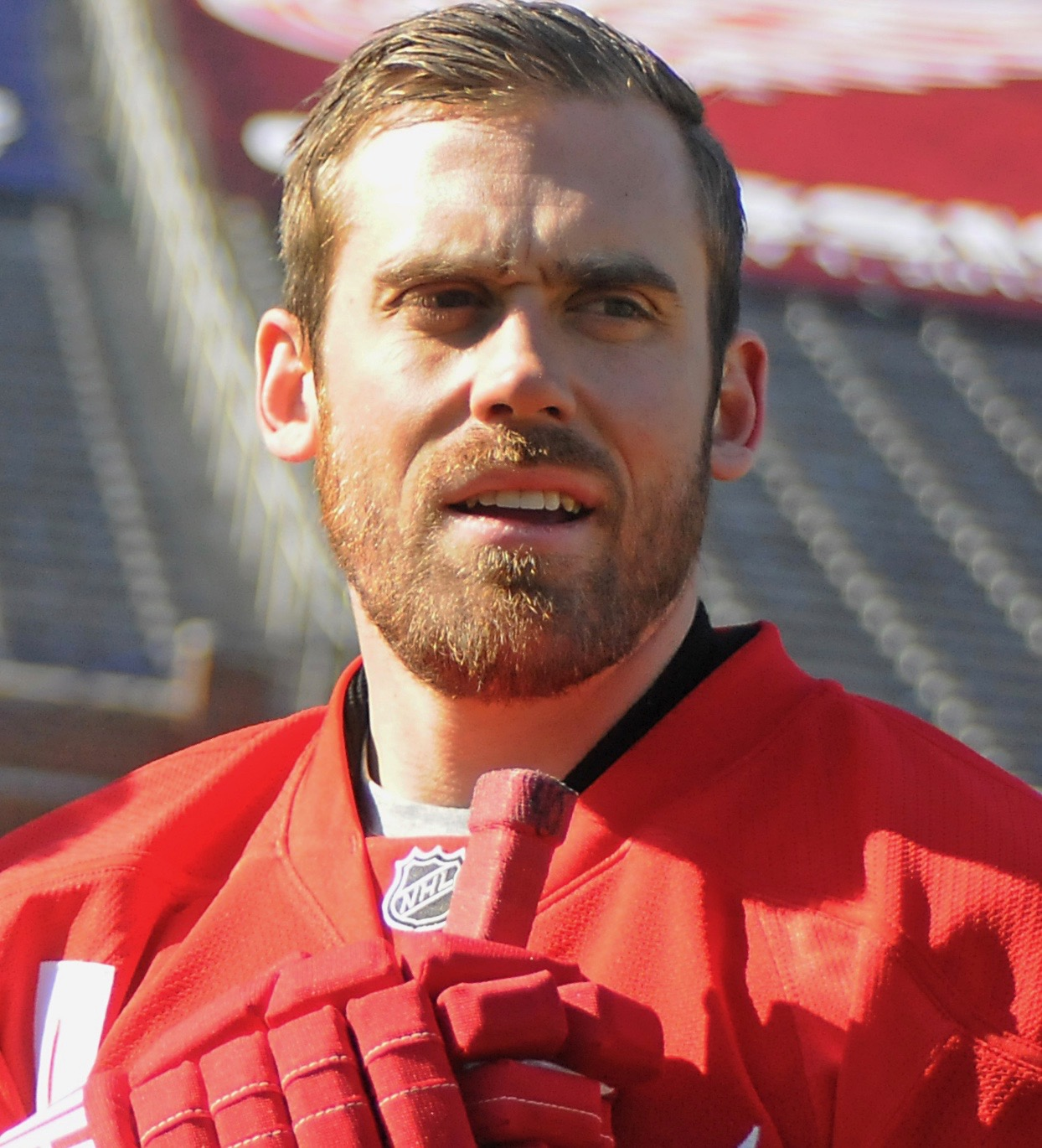
Henrik Zetterberg

- 2016–17 Detroit Red Wings season – Under head coach Jeff Blashill, the Red Wings compiled a 33–36–13 record and finished seventh in the NHL Atlantic Division. The team statistical leaders included Henrik Zetterberg with 51 assists and 68 points and Tomáš Tatar with 25 goals. The team's goaltenders were Petr Mrázek (44 games), Jimmy Howard (24 games started) and Jared Coreau (14 games started).
- 2016–17 Michigan Wolverines men's ice hockey team - In their 30th and final season under head coach Red Berenson, the Wolverines compiled a 13-19-3 record.
- 2016–17 Michigan State Spartans men's ice hockey team - Under head coach Tom Anastos, the Spartans compiled a 7–24–4 record.

=== Boxing ===
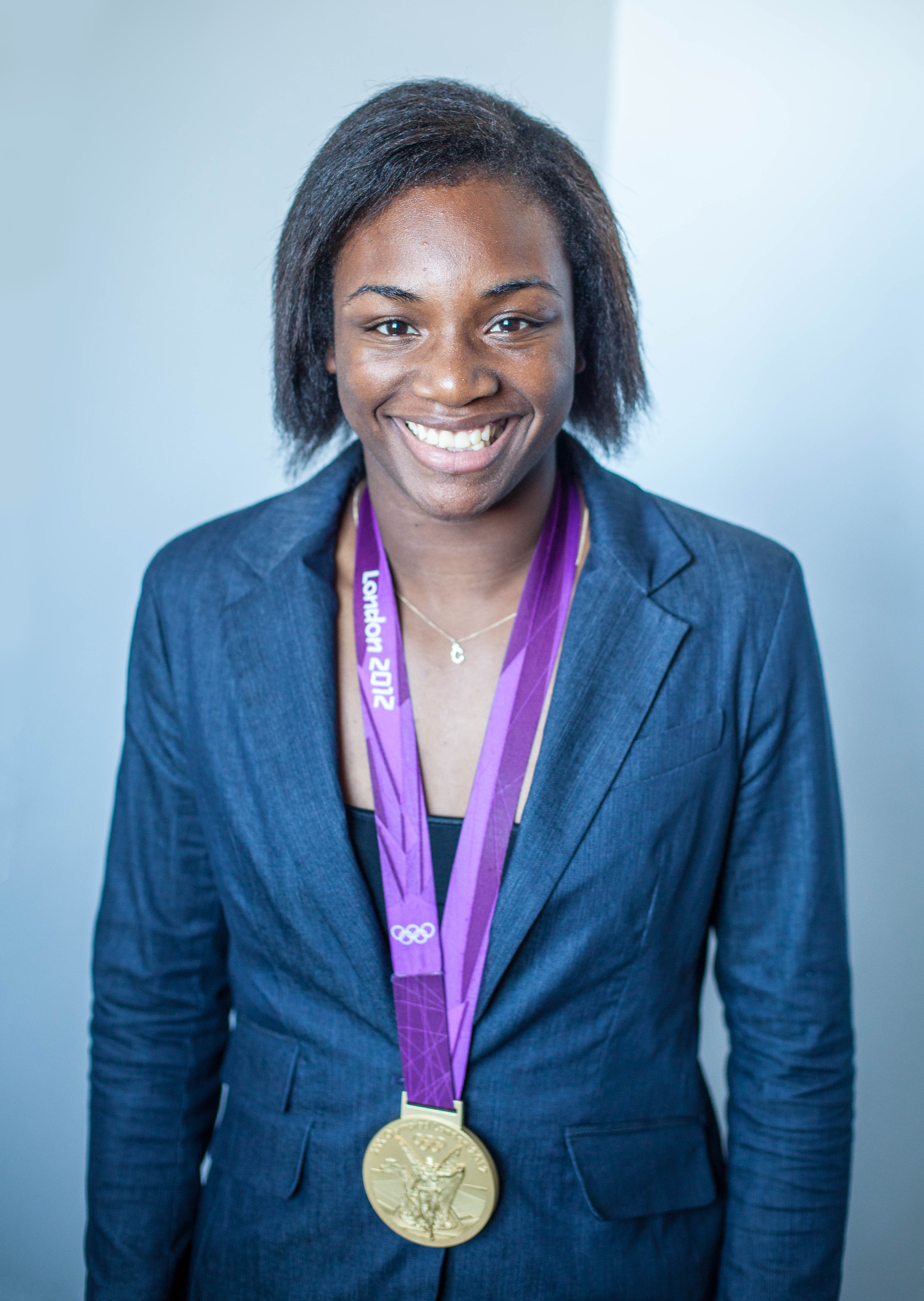
Claressa Shields

- March 10 - Claressa Shields of Flint won the vacant NABF female middleweight title with a victory by TKO over Szilvia Szabados at the MGM Grand Detroit
- June 16 - Claressa Shields won the vacant WBC Silver female super middleweight title with a victory over Sydney LeBlanc at the Detroit Masonic Temple
- August 4 - Claressa Shields won the WBC and vacant IBF female super middleweight titles with a victory by TKO over Nikki Adler at the MGM Grand Detroit.
- October 7 - The Kronk Gym in Detroit, boxing home of Thomas Hearns and others, was destroyed by fire.

=== Racing ===
- Port Huron to Mackinac Boat Race - Il Mostro won the race and set a new record time, 21 hours, 45 minutes.
- Pure Michigan 400 - The race was won by Kyle Larson of Chip Ganassi Racing.
- Detroit Grand Prix - The race was won by Graham Rahal of Rahal Letterman Lanigan Racing.

=== Other ===
- Michigan Open - Matt Thompson was the winner.

== Music ==
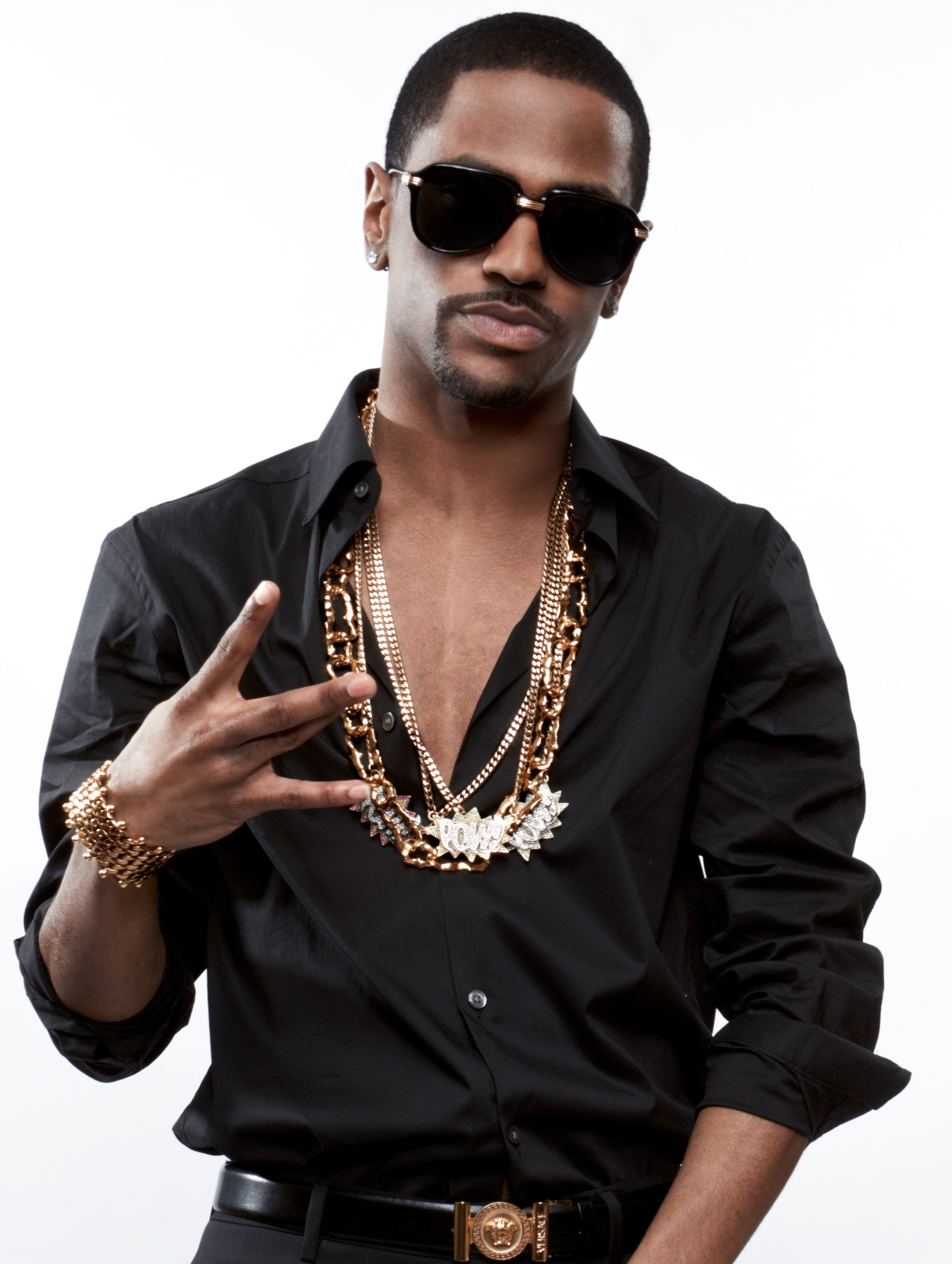
Big Sean

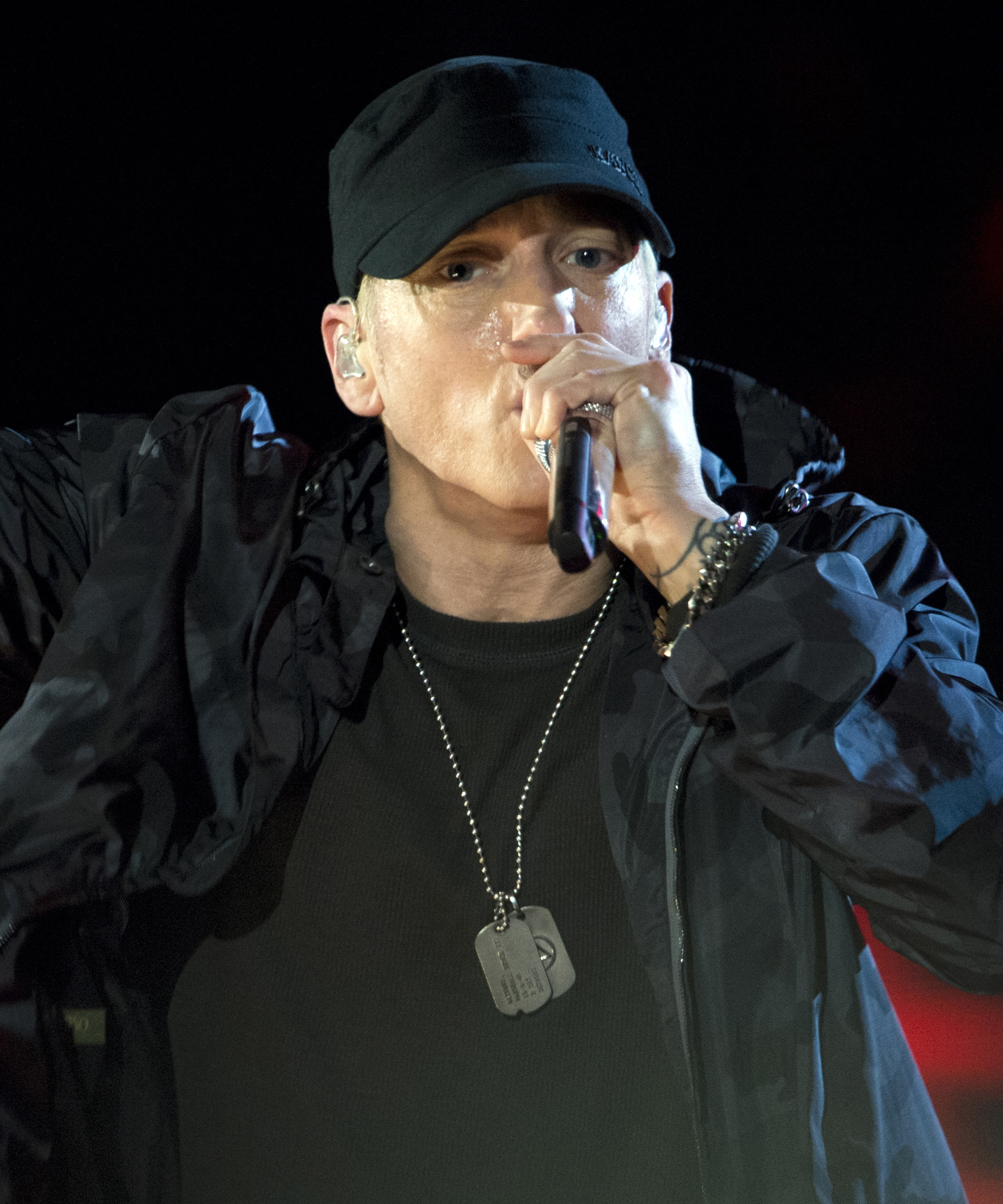
Eminem

- February 3 - Big Sean's album I Decided was released and reached No. 1 on the Billboard 200 album chart.
- February 17 - Frontier Ruckus' album Enter the Kingdom was released.
- May 27–29 - Movement, a.k.a. Detroit Electronic Music Festival
- June 10 - Aretha Franklin performed a 105-minute set at the Detroit Music Weekend. She was introduced by Sen. Debbie Stabenow and escorted to the stage by Jesse Jackson. Mayor Mike Duggan also came on stage during the set to present Aretha with a key to the city.
- June 15 - Bob Seger's music catalog became available for the first time on six streaming services, including Spotify and Apple Music.
- September 8 - Protomartyr's album Relatives in Descent was released.
- September 15 - Madonna's live album Rebel Heart Tour was released.
- October 9 - Ronald Yeargin, a member of Doughboyz Cashout, was discovered dead in his car in Detroit after sustaining multiple gunshot wounds.
- October 24 - Kid Rock ended speculation, announcing that he would not run for the U.S. Senate in 2018.
- October 26 - Eminem won a copyright lawsuit in New Zealand.
- October 27 - The Eagles perform at Detroit's new Little Caesars Arena. Deacon Frey replaced his deceased father in the band.
- November 3 - Kid Rock's album Sweet Southern Sugar was released and reached No. 8 on the Billboard 200 album chart.
- November 17 - Bob Seger's album I Knew You When was released and reached No. 25 on the Billboard 200 album chart.
- November 24 - Sufjan Stevens' mixtape The Greatest Gift was released.
- December 7 - Tee Grizzley's album Bloodas was released.
- December 8 - Big Sean's album Double or Nothing was released and reached No. 6 in the Billboard 200 album chart.
- December 15 - Eminem's album Revival was released and reached No. 1 on the Billboard 200 album chart.
- December 18 - Detroit hip-hop group, the Insane Clown Posse and their fans, the Juggalos, lost a federal appeal challenging the FBI's 2011 gang designation
- 2017 - Esham's album Scribble was released.
- 2017 - Karriem Riggins' Headnod Suite was released.
- 2017 - Dej Loaf's single "No Fear" was released.

== Chronology of events ==
=== January ===
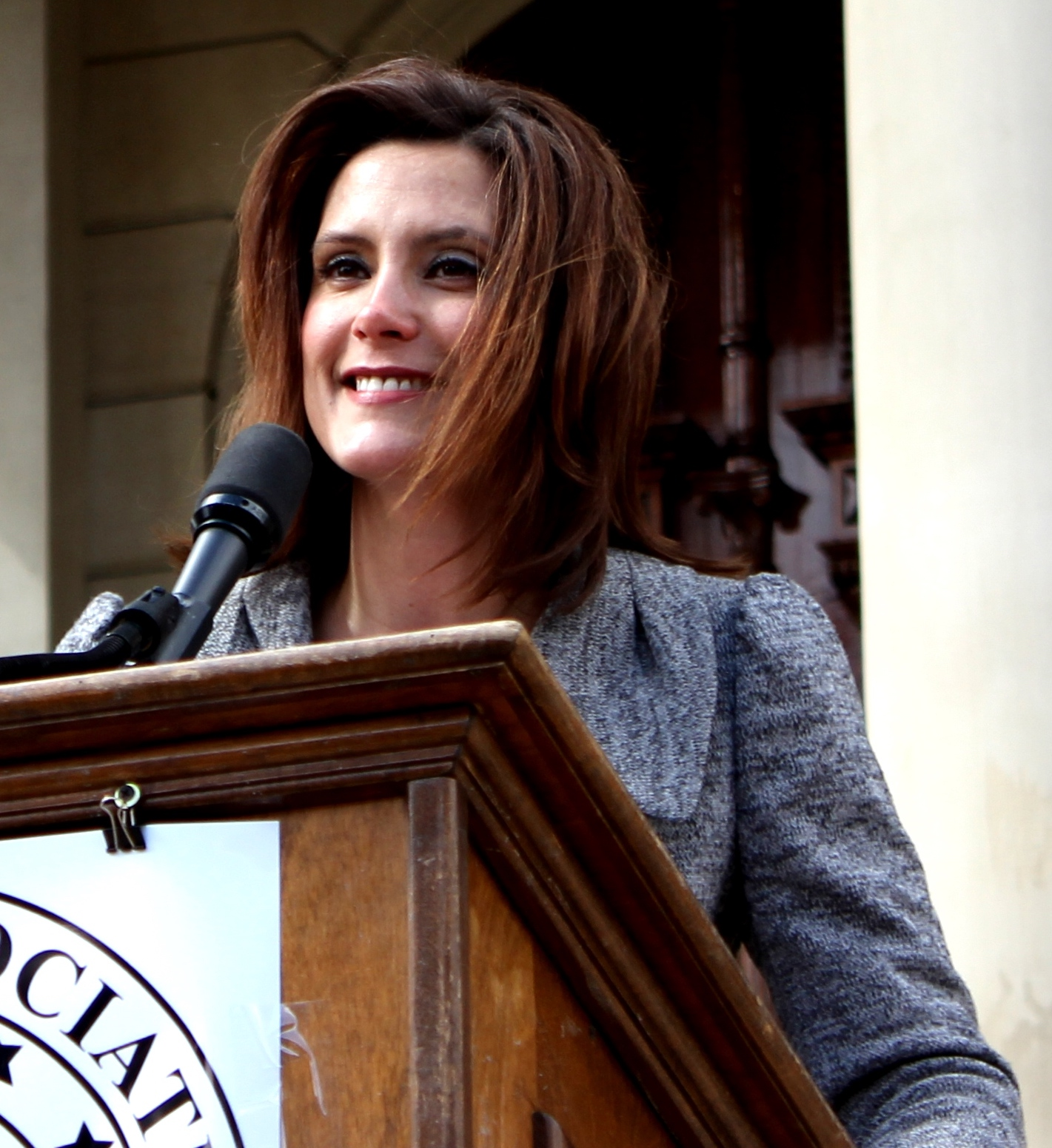
Gretchen Whitmer

- January 3 - Gretchen Whitmer, former minority leader of the Michigan Senate, filed paperwork as a candidate in the 2018 election for governor.
- January 4 - Ford Motor announced a $700 million investment to improve its Flat Rock, Michigan, plant to build self-driving and electric cars.
- January 8 - Fiat Chrysler announced plans to invest $1 billion at its Warren and Toledo Jeep plants.
- January 10 - A lawsuit was filed in Grand Rapids against Larry Nassar and Michigan State University by 18 women alleging they were sexually abused by Nassar.
- January 13–22 - North American International Auto Show in Detroit
- January 16 - A second group of tapes was released purporting to have the voice of Warren Mayor James R. Fouts denigrating black people and older women. Fouts denied the voice was his.
- January 18 - Iván Rodríguez, catcher for the Detroit Tigers from 2004 to 2008, was elected to the Baseball Hall of Fame.
- January __ - 61 Muslim refugees set for resettlement in Detroit had their travel restricted by President Donald Trump's Muslim travel ban.

=== February ===
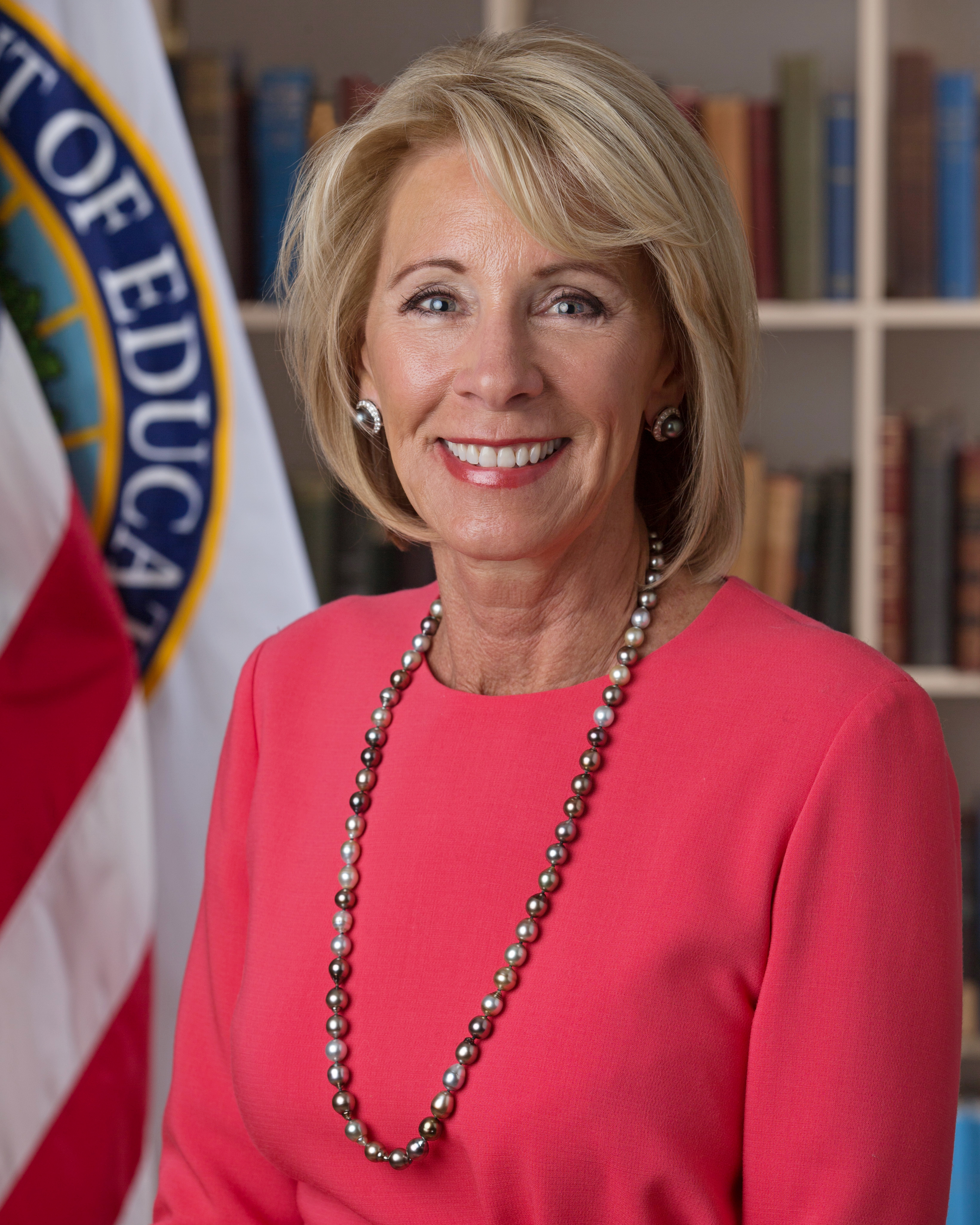
Betsy DeVos

- February 6 - Developer Dan Gilbert's Rock Ventures proposed building a soccer stadium and entertainment district on a downtown site slated for construction of a new jail. In exchange for the site, Gilbert would also build a new jail on another site.
- February 7 - Betsy DeVos of Michigan was confirmed by the U.S. Senate as Secretary of Education. The vote in the Senate was evenly split, requiring Vice President Mike Pence to cast the deciding vote.
- February 10 - Mike Ilitch died.
- February 19 - Three gymnasts appear on 60 Minutes to describe their experiences with Larry Nassar in the USA Gymnastics sex abuse scandal.
- February 22 - An additional 22 sexual assault charges were filed against Larry Nassar arising out of his Michigan State University Sports Medicine practice.
- February 22 - Developer Dan Gilbert proposed construction of Detroit's tallest building, a 52-story structure including 250 rental apartments, on the former site of the Hudson's department store.
- February 23 - Detroit Mayor Mike Duggan accused former emergency manager Kevyn Orr of keeping him in the dark with respect to calculations of the city's future pension payments. The discovery required the city to place an additional $50 million into a trust account. Duggan threatened to sue Orr's law firm, Jones Day, over the undisclosed calculations.
- February 25 - A record pressing plant operated by Jack White's Third Man Records held its grand opening in Detroit.
- February 26 - The Detroit Pistons retired the jersey (No. 22) worn by Rip Hamilton.

=== March ===
- March 8 - An airplane carrying the Michigan Wolverines basketball team skidded off the runway at Willow Run Airport, crossed a road, and crashed into a ditch. The team went on to win the Big Ten Conference Tournament and advanced to the Sweet Sixteen in the NCAA basketball tournament.
- March 15 - President Donald Trump visited the American Center for Mobility in Ypsilanti, accompanied by Gov. Rick Snyder, EPA administrator Scott Pruitt, General Motors CEO Mary Barra, Ford Motor CEO Mark Fields, and Fiat Chrysler CEO Sergio Marchionne.
- March 22 - Census Bureau estimates for 2016 show that Michigan's fastest growing counties were Kent (+ 6,078), Washtenaw (+ 3,862), and Oakland (+ 3,696). Wayne County's population declined by 7,696 persons.
- March 23 - Michigan lost to Oregon in the Sweet Sixteen round of the NCAA basketball tournament.
- March 31 - Wayne County assumed ownership of the former McClouth Steel plant in Trenton for failure to pay taxes.

=== April ===
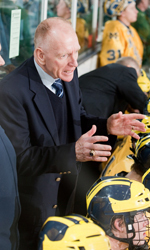
Red Berenson

- April 9 - The Detroit Red Wings played their final game at the Joe Louis Arena. The Red Wings played at Joe Louis Arena for 38 seasons, winning four Stanley Cup championships.
- April 10 - Red Berenson announced his retirement after 33 season's as head coach of the Michigan Wolverines hockey team.
- April 10 - The Detroit Pistons played their final game at The Palace of Auburn Hills.
- April 19 - Michigan rockers Ted Nugent and Kid Rock visited with Donald Trump at the White House.
- April 21 - Two doctors (Jumana Nagarwala and Fakhruddin Attar) and a third person from a Livonia, Michigan, clinic were charged with violation of a federal genital mutilation law for allegedly performing or facilitating religious ritual on seven-year-old Indian-Muslim girls.
- April 26 - Jim Harbaugh and his wife met with Pope Francis as Harbaugh and the Michigan football team visited Rome.

=== May ===
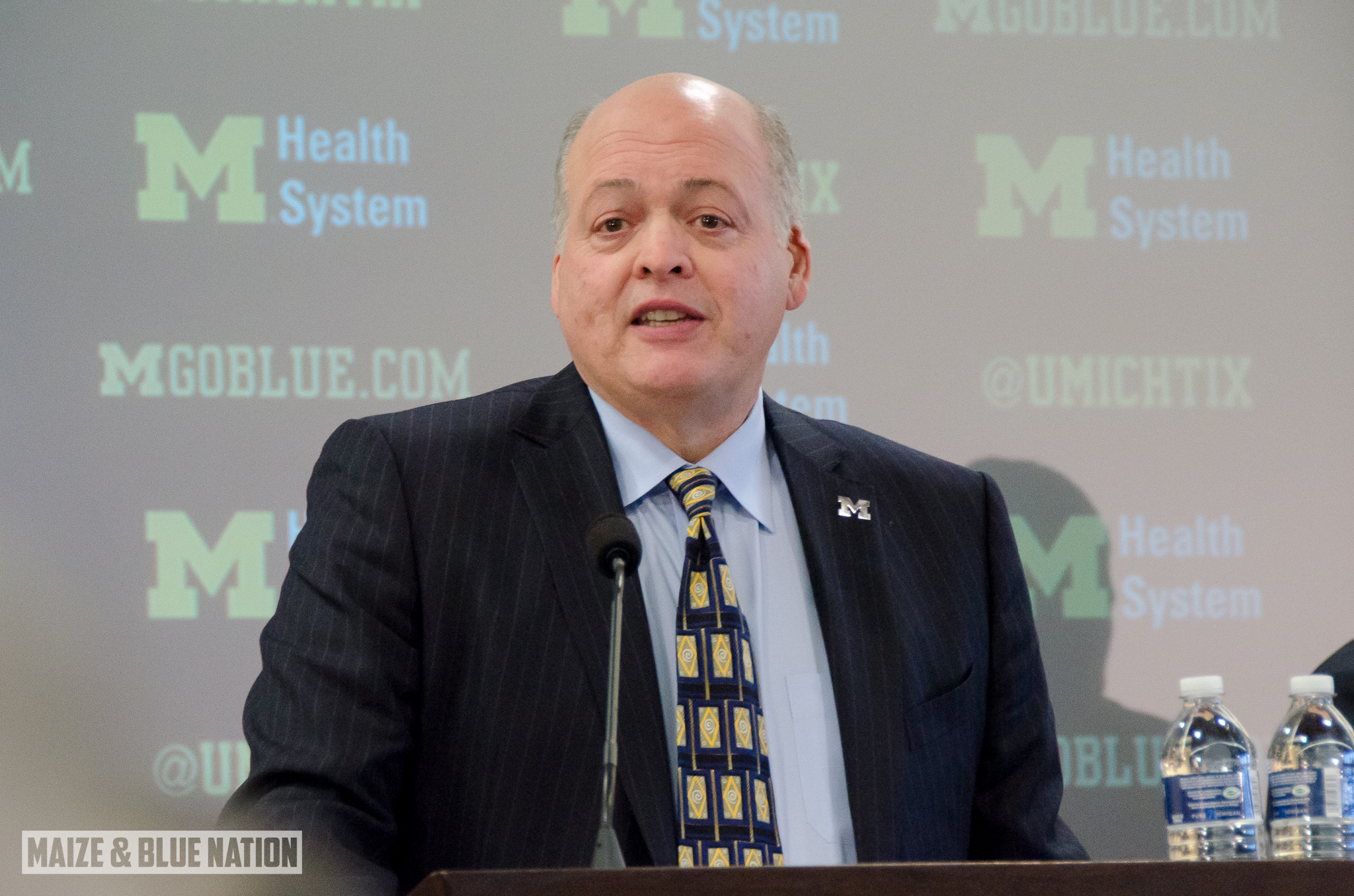
Jim Hackett

- May 4 - Catholic officials announced that Solanus Casey who co-founded the Capuchin Soup Kitchen in Detroit would be beatified.
- May 9 - State Rep. John Kivela was found dead from an apparent suicide after being arrested suspected drunk driving.
- May 12 - Two women testified in court that they were sexually abused by Michigan State University doctor Larry Nassar when they were teenagers.
- May 12 - Detroit's QLINE streetcar service opened for business along Woodward Avenue from Campus Martius to Grand Boulevard.
- May 16 - Ground was broken on redevelopment of Detroit's abandoned Packard plant into an office complex.
- May 19 - Ford Motor announced a $350 million investment in its Livonia transmission plant that would add 800 new jobs.
- May 22 - Jim Hackett, formerly CEO of Steelcase, took over as CEO of Ford Motor.
- May 23 - The U.S. Department of Justice sued Fiat Chrysler for selling diesel engines that violate the Clean Air Act.
- May 24 - The 2016 Census estimate showed a 0.5% decline in Detroit's population to 672,795, dropping to the 23rd largest city in the United States. Detroit reached a peak population of 1,849,568 in 1950. The 2016 population represented a decline of 63.6% of the city's 1950 level.

=== June ===
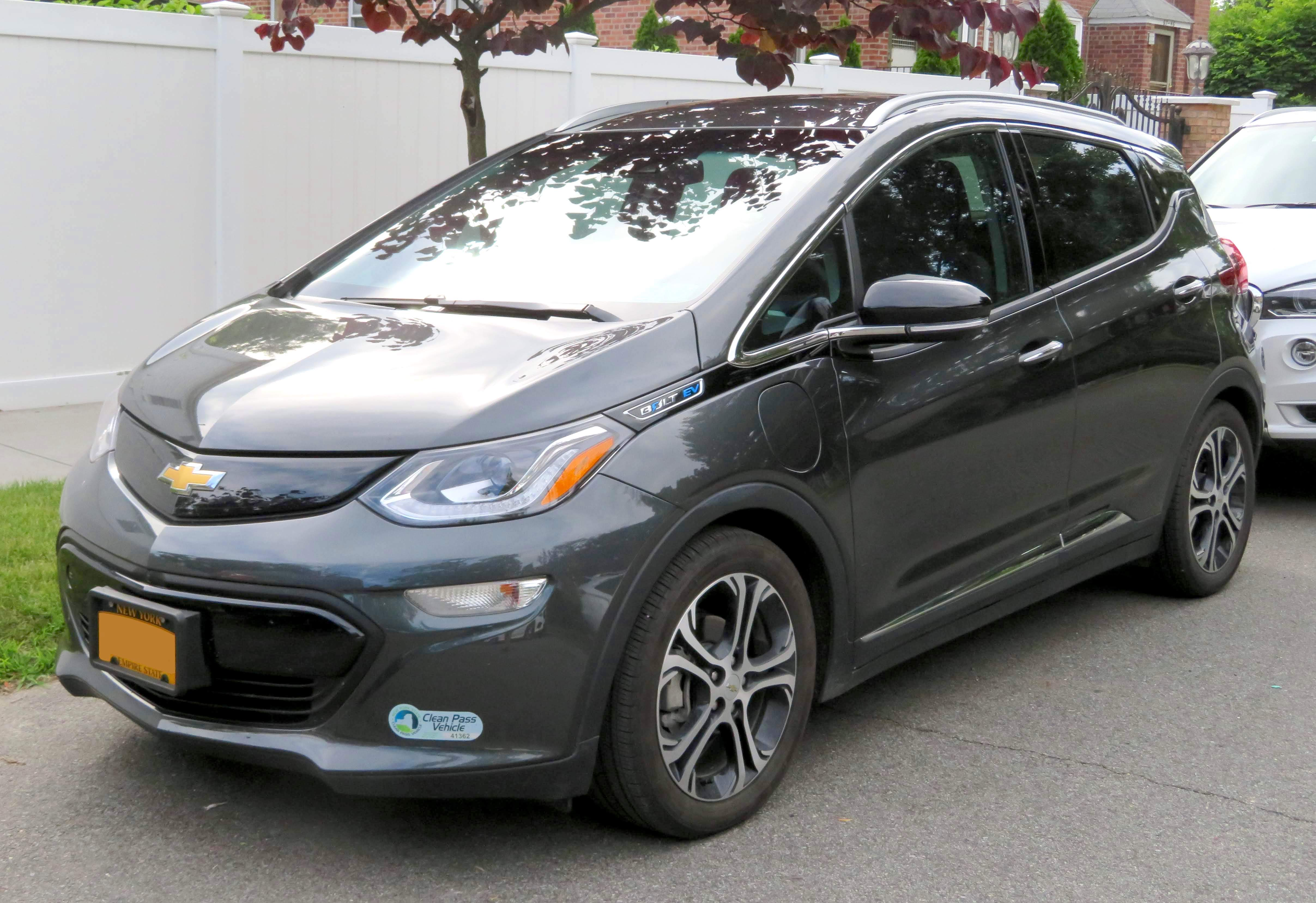
Chevrolet Bolt

- June 5 - Three Michigan State football players were dismissed from the football program after being charged with sexually assaulting a woman in a bathroom at a party in January.
- June 13 - General Motors announced that it had manufactured 130 autonomous Chevrolet Bolts at its factory in Lake Orion, Michigan.
- June 14 - In connection with the Flint water crisis, Michigan Attorney General Bill Schuette charged five officials with involuntary manslaughter in the death of a Legionnaire's disease patient. The five charged included Nick Lyon, director of the Michigan Department of Health and Human Services. In addition, the state's top medical executive, Eden Wells, was charged with obstruction of justice.
- June 29 - Rock Ventures, owned by Dan Gilbert, proposed a new $520 million jail complex in Detroit.

=== July ===
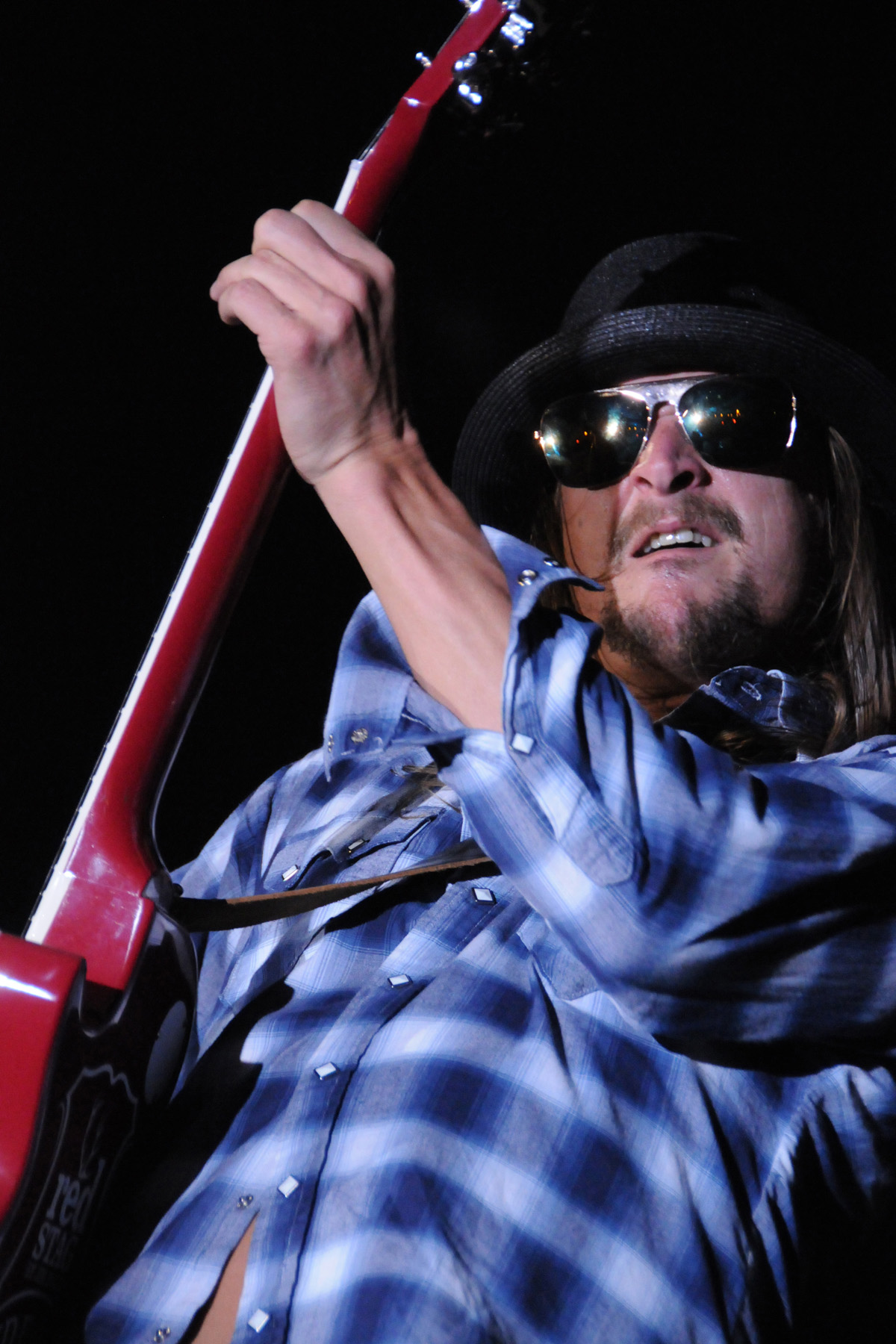
Kid Rock

- July 9 - Michigan State University doctor Larry Nassar agreed to enter a guilty plea to federal child pornography charges.
- July 12 - Kid Rock teased about running against Debbie Stabenow for her U.S. Senate seat.
- July 14 - The Michigan Parole Board voted unanimously to parole Richard "White Boy Rick" Wershe Jr. who had been in prison since 1988 for possession of cocaine with intent to deliver.
- July 18 - The Detroit Tigers traded J. D. Martinez to the Arizona Diamondbacks for three prospects.
- July 21 - The Detroit Red Wings signed Tomáš Tatar to a four-year $21-million contract.
- July 23–27 - The 50th anniversary of the 1967 Detroit riot.
- July 25 - The film Detroit based on the Algiers Motel incident during the 1967 Detroit riot, was released.
- July 29 - The final ticketed event was held at Joe Louis Arena, a WWE professional wrestling event featuring John Cena.

=== August ===
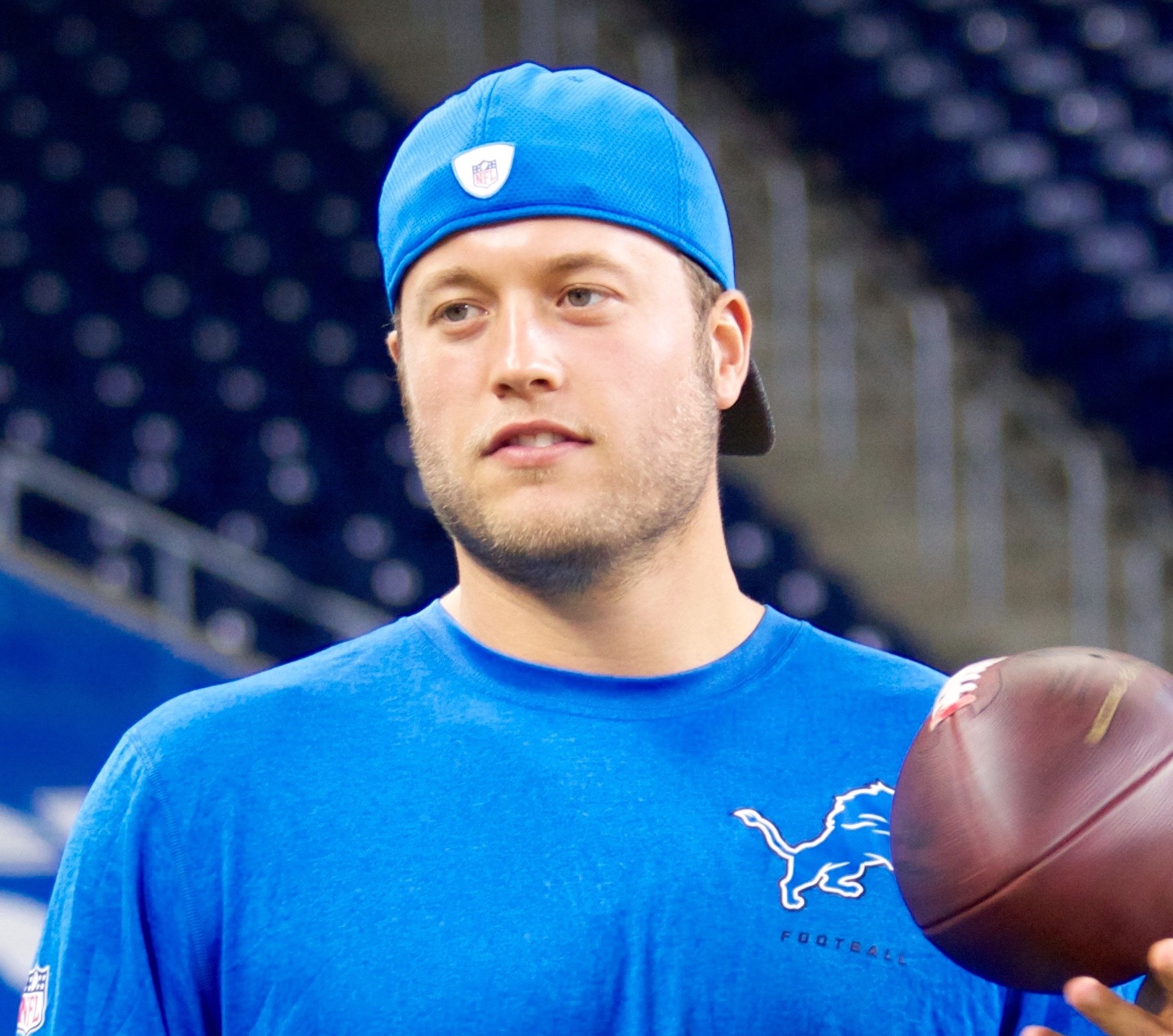
Matt Stafford

- August 9 - Marygrove College in Detroit announced it was terminating its undergraduate program.
- August 12 - The Detroit Red Wings announce that they are examining legal remedies to prevent use of a modified team logo by white supremacists at the Unite the Right rally in Charlottesville.
- August 19 - Woodward Avenue Dream Cruise
- August 25 - Volkswagen engineer James Liang was sentenced in federal court in Detroit to 40 months in prison for his role in the diesel emissions cheating scandal.
- August 26 - A Michigan State Police trooper tasered an unarmed 15-year-old, Demond Grimes, as he rode an ATV, causing a crash that resulted in Grimes' death. A wrongful death suit followed with Geoffrey Fieger representing Grimes' family.
- August 28 - The Detroit Lions signed Matthew Stafford to the richest contract in NFL history, a five-year extension worth $135 million.

=== September ===
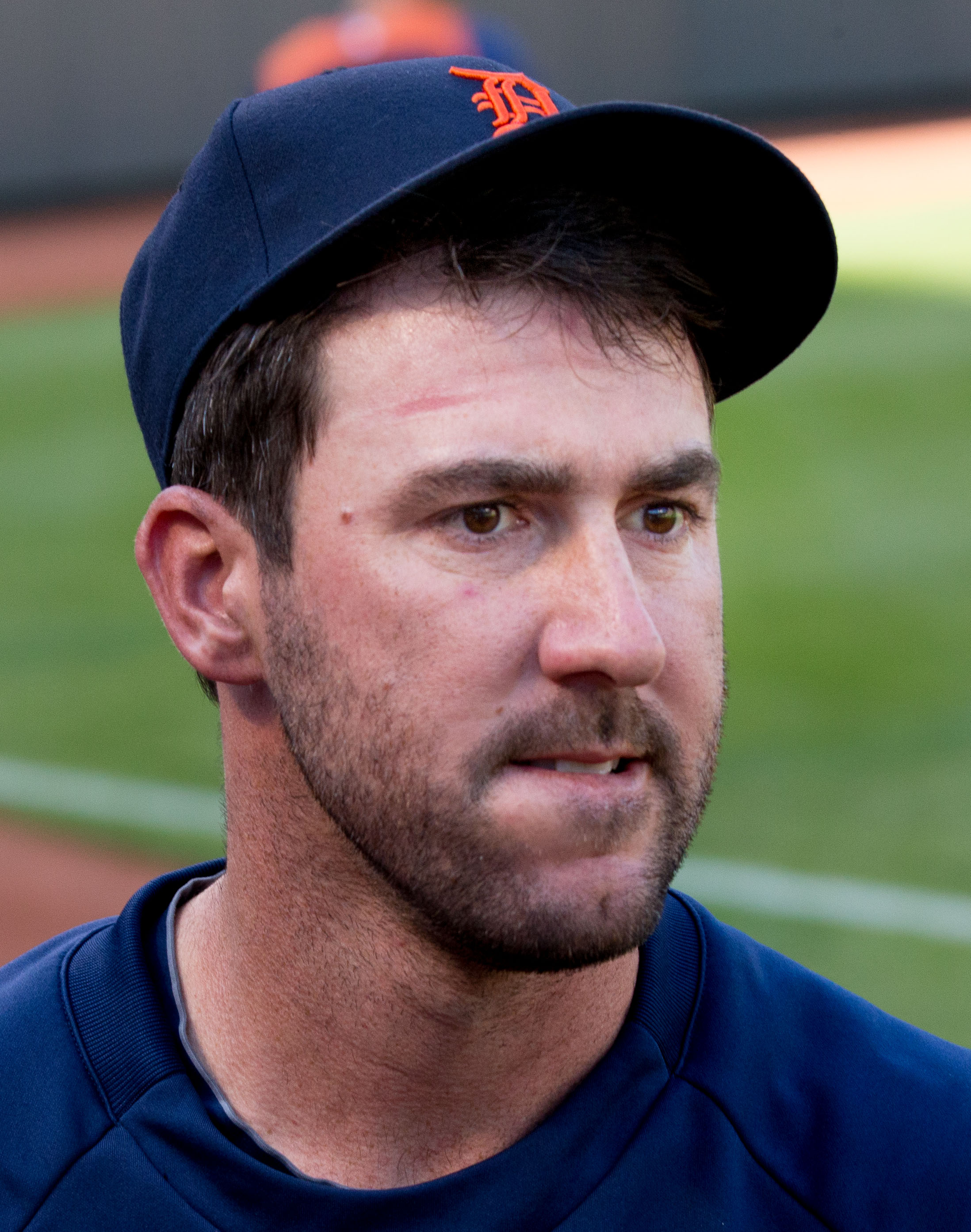
Justin Verlander

- September 1 - The Detroit Tigers traded Justin Verlander to the Houston Astros.
- September 5 - Ribbon-cutting ceremony for Little Caesars Arena in Detroit, built at cost of $863 million.
- September 12 - Michigan Attorney General Bill Schuette announced he would run for governor in 2018.
- September 13 - Little Caesars Arena opened in Detroit with a Kid Rock concert.
- September 18 - The mayor and a councilman of Fraser, Michigan, were removed from office for alleged sexual harassment of female city workers.
- September 23 - Brad Ausmus was fired as manager of the Detroit Tigers.
- September 26–29 - Michigan State Police director Kriste Kibbey Etue came under fire after a Facebook post in which she referred to NFL players kneeling during the national anthem as "ungrateful, anti-American degenerates." Gov. Rick Snyder rejected calls to remove her.

=== October ===
- October 3 - Ford Motor CEO Jim Hackett announced plans to focus on electric vehicles and to manufacture fewer models.
- October 4 - Ferndale mother Rebecca Bredow was jailed for refusing to comply with a court order requiring her to vaccinate her nine-year-old son.
- October 5 - The Detroit Red Wings played the first game at Little Caesars Arena. Anthony Mantha scored the first goal.
- October 9 - Dr. Eden Wells, chief medical officer of the Michigan Department of Health and Human Services, was charged with involuntary manslaughter in connection with the Flint water crisis.
- October 18 - Olympic gymnast McKayla Maroney stated that she was among the sexual abuse victims of Michigan State physician Larry Nassar.
- October 18 - The Detroit Pistons played their first game in Little Caesars Arena, marking their return to Detroit after 40 years of playing in Pontiac and Auburn Hills.
- October 19 - The Detroit Tigers hired Ron Gardenhire as their new manager.
- October 23 - Detroit was named by Lonely Planet as the second best city in the world to visit in 2018.
- October 26 - Demolition began on the historic Northland Center shopping mall in Oakland County, Michigan
- October 27 - Women's Convention opens in Detroit.

=== November ===
- November 7 -
  - Mike Duggan was reelected as Mayor of Detroit. He received more than 71% of the votes cast.
  - Andy Schor was elected as Mayor of Lansing. He received 72% of the votes.
  - A special election is held in two districts of the Michigan House of Representatives, in which two Democrats won seats.
- November 9 - The University of Michigan Intrafraternity Council suspended all social events at the school's 27 fraternities. The suspension was triggered by allegations of sexual assaults involving fraternity members and hazing incidents.
- November 9 - A Marine drill instructor was found guilty in a court martial for mistreating three Muslim recruits, including Raheel Siddiqui of Taylor, Michigan, who died in 2016 after falling down three flights of stairs after being slapped by the drill instructor.
- November 10 - Olympic gymnast Aly Raisman joins the group alleging that she was sexually abused by Larry Nassar.
- November 18 - The Catholic Church beatified Solanus Casey who co-founded the Capuchin Soup Kitchen in Detroit.
- November 20 - A coalition turned in 400,000 signatures to place an initiative on the 2018 ballot to legalize recreational marijuana.
- November 21 - The University of Detroit Mercy announced it was reducing tuition by 30% in the fall of 2018, from $41,158 to $28,000 per year.
- November 25 - Michigan loses to Ohio State in the annual Michigan–Ohio State football rivalry game.
- November 28 - Lt. Gov. Brian Calley announced his candidacy for governor in the 2018 election.
- November 30 - Leaders in the House of Representatives, including Paul Ryan, Nancy Pelosi, and Jim Clyburn, called on John Conyers to resign over allegations of sexual harassment.

=== December ===
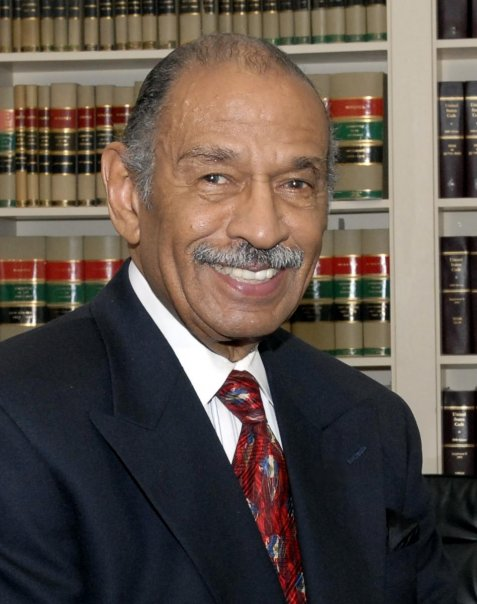
John Conyers

- December 2 - Sander Levin, a Michigan Congressman for 35 years, announced at age 86 that he would not run for reelection in 2018.
- December 2 - Four teenagers were shot outside the Detroit Institute of Arts during the city's "Noel Night" celebration.
- December 4 - The implosion and demolition of the Pontiac Silverdome began.
- December 5 - John Conyers resigned his seat in Congress amid allegations he had sexually abused members of his staff. Conyers had represented Detroit in Congress since first being elected in 1964. His tenure was the sixth longest in congressional history.
- December 7 - Ford Motor announced that it would build electric vehicles to Mexico. The company also announced plans to create 850 new jobs in Flat Rock, Michigan, to build autonomous vehicles.
- December 8 - Gov. Rick Snyder announced that he would not set a special election to fill John Conyers' vacant seat in Congress until November 2018, leaving the 13th District unrepresented for 11 months.
- December 11 - Ole Miss quarterback Shea Patterson announced he would transfer to Michigan.
- December 13 - Detroiter Bernard Young was released from prison after 28 years. He had been convicted of molestation based on testimony from a five- and six-year-old who later recanted.
- December 14 - William Strampel, dean of the Michigan State College of Osteopathic Medicine, who had been Larry Nassar's boss, stepped down as dean, citing medical reasons.
- December 15 - Michigan State University president Lou Anna Simon apologized for the misconduct of Michigan State doctor Larry Nassar in the USA Gymnastics sex abuse scandal.

== Deaths ==
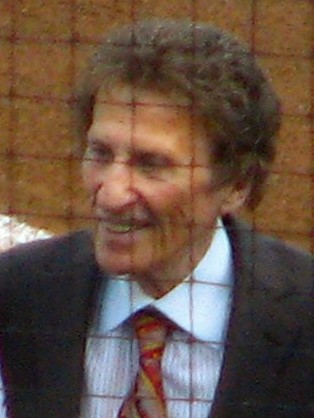
Mike Ilitch

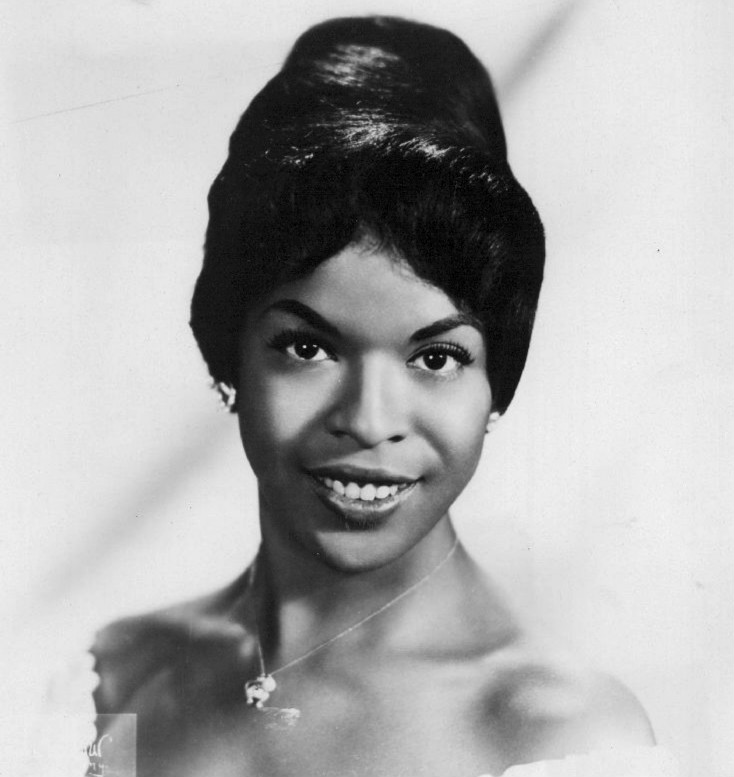
Della Reese

- January 8 - Marvin Jay Yagoda, creator of Marvin's Marvelous Mechanical Museum in Farmington Hills, at age 78
- February 10 - Mike Ilitch, entrepreneur, founder of Little Caesars Pizza, and owner of Detroit Red Wings and Detroit Tigers, at age 87 in Detroit
- February 16 - George Steele, professional wrestler and Detroit native, at age 79 in Cocoa Beach, Florida
- February 23 - Leon Ware, Motown singer, songwriter, and music producer, at age 77 in Marina del Rey, California
- March 22 - Francine Hughes, Danville woman who set fire to the bed of her ex-husband in 1977 and the subject of The Burning Bed, at age 69 in Alabama
- March 25 - Rich Fisher, anchor at WXYZ and Fox 2 in Detroit for nearly 20 years, at age 67
- March 26 - Maurice "Bud" Lezell, portrayed "Mr. Belvedere" in Detroit television commercials in the 1960s and 1970s, at age 95 in Florida
- March 30 - Robert Mahoney, first blind member of the Michigan House of Representatives, at age 95 in East Lansing
- April 15 - Sylvia Moy, Motown songwriter and producer ("Uptight (Everything's Alright)", "My Cherie Amour", "It Takes Two"), at age 78 in Dearborn, Michigan
- May 11 - Yale Lary, safety for Detroit Lions (1952-1964) and member of Pro Football Hall of Fame, at age 86 in Fort Worth, Texas
- May 18 - Chris Cornell, lead singer of Soundgarden, suicide by hanging at age 52 in his room at Detroit's MGM Grand Detroit
- June 1 - Jack McCloskey, general manager of the Detroit Pistons from 1979 to 1992, at age 91 in Savannah, Georgia
- June 5 - Ted Topor, MVP of the 1952 Michigan Wolverines football team who also played one season with the Detroit Lions, at age 87 in Highland, Lake County, Indiana
- June 27 - Geri Allen, jazz pianist and composer, at age 60 in Philadelphia
- August 15 - Vern Ehlers, nuclear physicist and U.S. Congressman from Michigan (1993-2011), at age 83 in Grand Rapids, Michigan
- August 15 - Gunnar Birkerts, Detroit-based architect, at age 92 in Needham, Massachusetts
- August 28 - Jud Heathcote, head coach of Michigan State men's basketball team (1976–1995), at age 90 in Spokane, Washington
- September 11 - Dan Currie, linebacker for Michigan State and in the NFL, All-American in 1957, at age 82 in Las Vegas
- November 4 - Anna Diggs Taylor, U.S. District Court Judge (1979-2017), at age 84 in Grosse Pointe Woods, Michigan
- November 19 - Della Reese, singer, actress and Detroit native, at age 86 in Los Angeles
- November 19 - Warren "Pete" Moore, singer, songwriter ("Ooo Baby Baby", "The Tracks of My Tears", "Love Machine"), producer, and member of Motown's The Miracles, at age 79 in Las Vegas
- December 15 - Eugene Applebaum, founder of Arbor Drugs and donor to Wayne State's Eugene Applebaum College of Pharmacy and Health Sciences, at age 81 in Bloomfield Hills, Michigan
- December 21 - Dick Enberg, sportscaster and Michigan native, at age 82 in La Jolla, California

=== Gallery of 2017 deaths ===
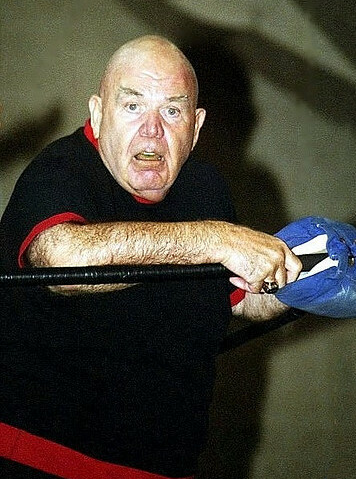
George Steele

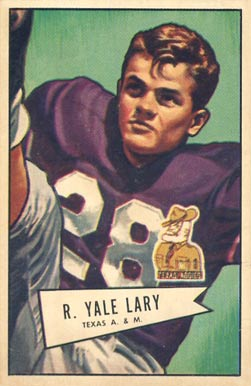
Yale Lary

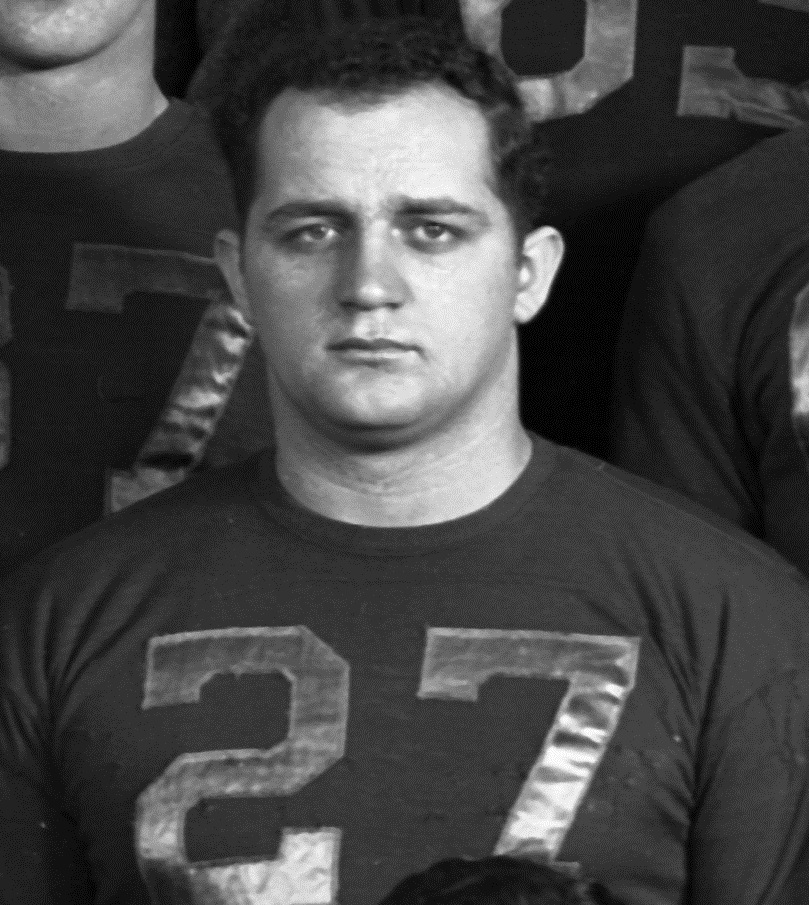
Ted Topor

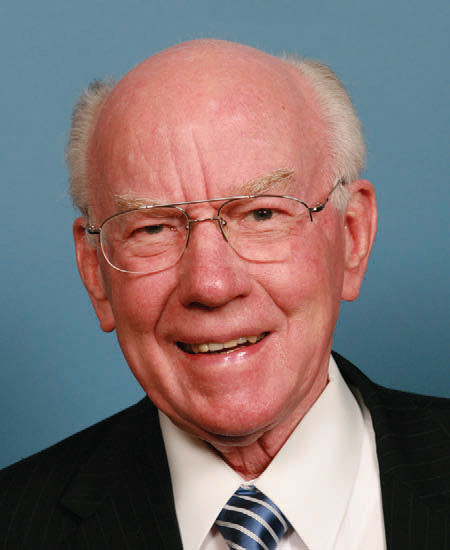
Vern Ehlers

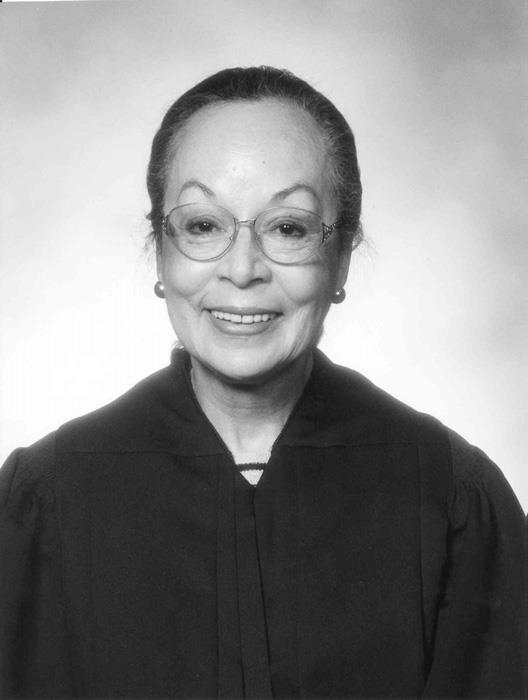
Anna Diggs Taylor

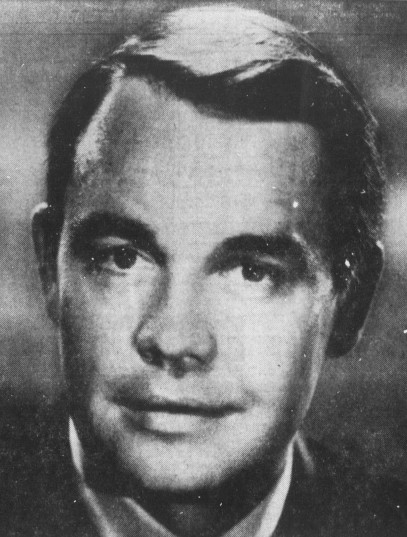
Dick Enberg

== See also ==
- History of Michigan
- History of Detroit
