= Mark Fields (businessman) =

American business executive

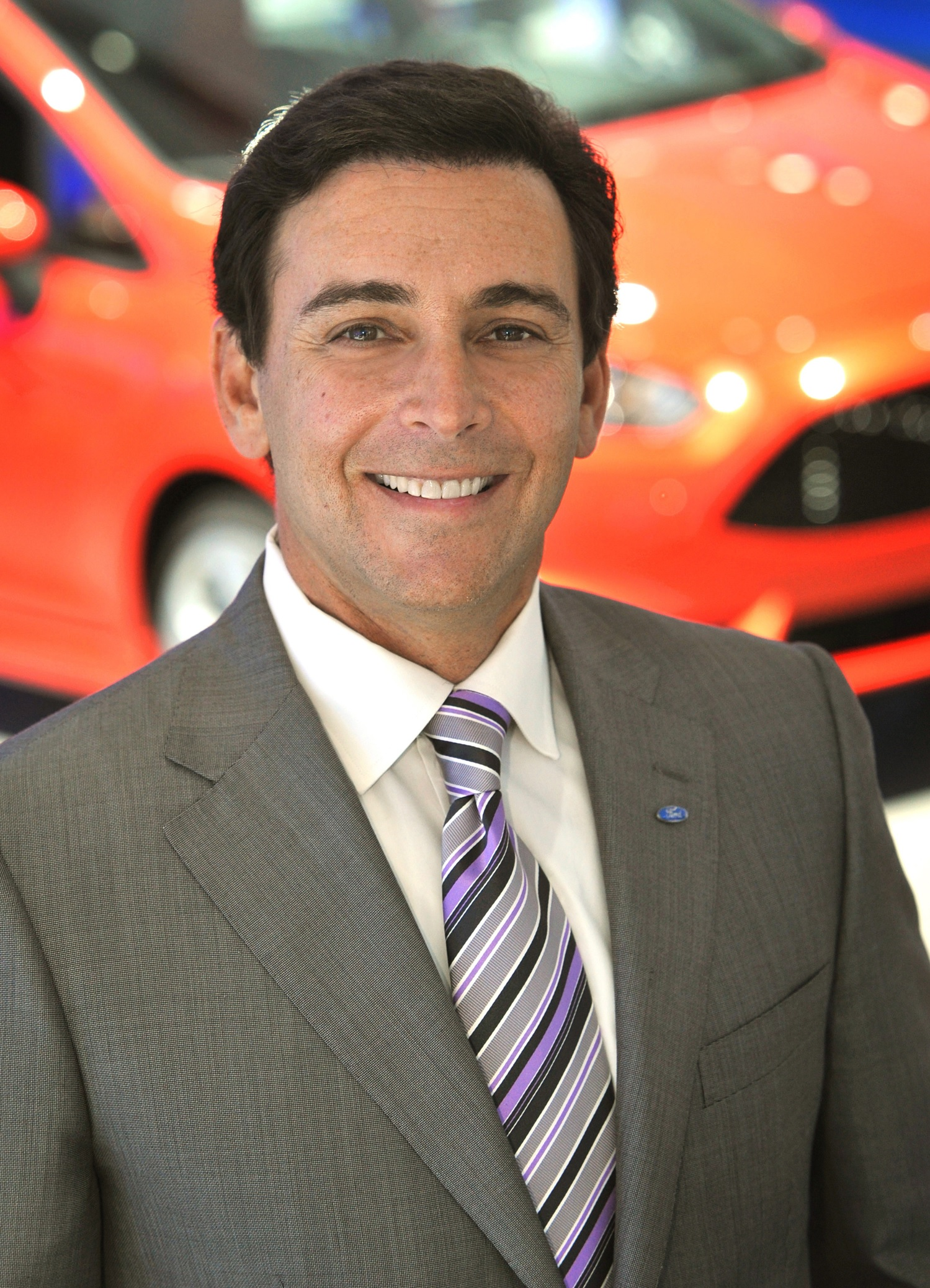
- Mark Fields, 2014
- Born: January 24, 1961 (age 65); New York City, New York, U.S.
- Citizenship: United States
- Education: Paramus High School (1979); Rutgers University (B.A.); Harvard University (M.B.A.)
- Title: Former president and CEO of Ford Motor Company; Hertz interim CEO
- Term: 2014–2017
- Predecessor: Alan Mulally
- Successor: Jim Hackett

Mark Fields (born January 24, 1961) is an American businessman and former chief executive officer of Ford Motor Company. Prior to his July 1, 2014 appointment, Fields served as the company's chief operating officer. Previously, as Ford's president of The Americas, Fields developed "The Way Forward" plan and separately led a significant turnaround of Mazda. He succeeded Alan Mulally as Ford's president and CEO. Fields announced his retirement on May 22, 2017. He currently serves as senior advisor at TPG Capital and on several corporate boards and he previously served as interim CEO of Hertz.

== Early life, education and family ==
Fields was born in the New York City borough of Brooklyn. Fields grew up in Paramus, New Jersey, where he attended Paramus High School, graduating in 1979. Fields holds a bachelor's degree in economics from Rutgers University and a master of business administration from Harvard Business School. While studying at Rutgers, Fields joined the Delta chapter of Zeta Psi Fraternity. He worked for IBM prior to earning his MBA.

== Career in business ==
Fields was recruited by Ford in 1989 and moved up the ranks. He ran Ford's Argentina operations at the age of 36.

Fields was assigned to Japan to run marketing and sales for Mazda (then owned by Ford). He was named president and CEO of Mazda Motor Corporation in 2000 at age 38, then the youngest CEO ever of a major Japanese company. Prior to his arrival, Mazda posted an annual operating loss of over $US100 million. Fields instituted a turnaround plan that saw Mazda post a 2001 operating profit of $215 million by creating a culture of promoting for talent rather than seniority, reducing labor costs and implementing a unified design product vision that led to the company’s "Zoom-Zoom" brand image of the 2000s.

In 2002, Fields became chairman and CEO of the Premier Automotive Group, Ford's luxury unit, which at the time included Aston Martin, Jaguar, Land Rover and Volvo Cars. He then was named executive vice president, Ford of Europe and Premier Automotive Group, where he led all activities for Ford's premium vehicle business group and for Ford brand vehicles manufactured and sold in European countries. Ford’s European operations returned a profit in 2004 for the first time since 1997. All Premiere units other than Jaguar were profitable by 2005. Aston Martin "created a new generation of products including the Vantage and DB9" that "led to the highest sales years in the company's history."

In 2005, he returned to the United States to head the Americas division of the company. In this role, he developed the "Way Forward" plan, which was designed to make Ford's North American operations leaner and more centrally driven in areas such as product development, purchasing and engineering. Under Fields, in 2012 Ford reported record-high North American profits of $8.3 billion on a record 12% profit margin.

In December 2012, Ford appointed Fields its chief operating officer. He was named president and CEO of Ford effective July 1, 2014, succeeding Alan Mulally.

During Fields' tenure at Ford, Fields was credited with replacing a combative senior executive culture with a collaborative one. Former CEO Mullaly recounts a time when Fields took personal responsibility for a failed tailgate latch on an SUV that was delaying the car's launch, in contrast to the rosy projections offered by other senior leaders in the face of serious challenges. In 2015, Ford reported its highest profits and margins ever and was able to distribute $9,300 profit-sharing checks to hourly employees. In 2016, Ford announced plans to redesign its Dearborn headquarters into a walkable, "Silicon Valley"-style campus. As CEO, Fields committed $4.5 billion to electrified vehicles, including the electric Mustang Mach-E, and returned to the 24 Hours of Le Mans race to win on the 50th anniversary of its 1966 victory. In February 2017 Fields drove an investment in Argo AI, combining Ford’s autonomous vehicle development efforts with Argo AI’s robotics and artificial intelligence expertise. On May 22, 2017, Fields announced his retirement from Ford and was replaced by James Hackett.

Fields became a senior adviser at private equity firm TPG Capital in October 2017, focusing on the firm's industrial and technology practice. He serves on the Board of Directors of Qualcomm, Tanium, Hertz, and others. In mid-March 2020 he predicted a recession based on the impact of COVID-19 on the global economy and has described the electric vehicle industry as facing a "reckoning." Fields is a regular contributor on CNBC, appearing on programs such as Squawk Box, Money Movers and Last Call.

From October 2021 through March 2022, Fields was the interim CEO of Hertz with a focus on forward looking investments. On October 25, 2021, Fields announced that Hertz will buy 100,000 Tesla vehicles citing his goal of fleet electrification and that Tesla is the "only manufacturer that can produce EVs at scale." Hertz eventually reported a $2.9 billion net loss largely driven by its failed multi-billion-dollar electric vehicle (EV) strategy.

Business positions
Preceded by Alan Mulally	Chief executive officer of the Ford Motor Company; 2014–2017	Succeeded by Jim Hackett
