= Jim Farley (businessman) =

American businessman and CEO of Ford Motor Company

- Farley in 2024
- Born: James Duncan Farley Jr. June 10, 1962 (age 64); Buenos Aires, Argentina
- Education: Georgetown University (BA); University of California, Los Angeles (MBA)
- Occupation: Chief Executive Officer of Ford Motor Company
- Years active: 2007–present
- Children: 3
- Relatives: Chris Farley (cousin); Kevin Farley (cousin); John Farley (cousin); Tripp Tracy (cousin)

James Duncan Farley Jr. (born June 10, 1962) is an American businessman. He is the CEO of Ford Motor Company, a board member of McDonald's, and former board member of Harley-Davidson.

== Background ==
Farley was born to a banker father in Buenos Aires, Argentina, where he spent his early years, before moving to Greenwich, Connecticut. Before university, Farley attended Portsmouth Abbey School, a Catholic, college preparatory school in Portsmouth, Rhode Island. He graduated from Georgetown University and then later, the UCLA Anderson School of Management at the University of California, Los Angeles.

Farley's grandfather worked at Henry Ford's River Rouge Plant in 1918. He is a cousin of the entertainers Chris Farley, Kevin Farley, and John Farley. He is also a cousin of Carolina Hurricanes TV analyst and former NHL and AHL player Tripp Tracy.

== Career ==
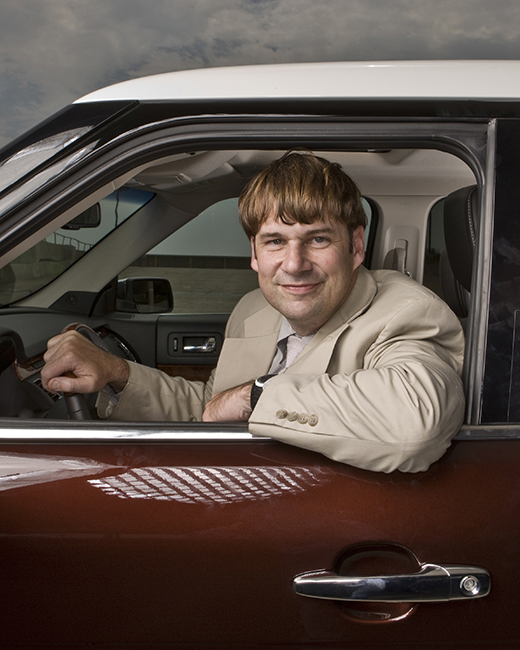
Farley in 2008

Before joining Ford in November 2007, Farley was group vice president and general manager of Lexus, responsible for all sales, marketing, and customer satisfaction activities for Toyota’s luxury auto brand. From 2015 to 2017, he was CEO and chairman of Ford Europe. From June 2017 to May 2019, he was executive vice president and president of global markets. In May 2019, Farley was appointed president, New Business, Technology and Strategy. In February 2020, Farley was named as COO.

On August 4, 2020, Ford announced that Farley would succeed Jim Hackett as the CEO of Ford on October 1, 2020. At the same time, it was announced that Hackett would retire and become a special advisor.

Farley has consistently earned over $20,000,000 annually in his role as CEO of Ford. In 2025, his total compensation rose 11% from the previous year to approximately $27,500,000. Over the same period of time, Ford issued a record-setting 153 recall orders, prompting concerns over the company's long-term quality control measures.

Farley was on the Harley-Davidson board of directors from July 2021 to February 2026, in an effort to revitalize the motorcycle maker and prepare it for electrification. In February 2026, Farley was elected to the McDonald's board of directors, effective February 4, 2026.

== Views on technology ==
In July 2025, Farley predicted that "artificial intelligence is going to replace literally half of all white-collar workers in the U.S." Under Farley's leadership, Ford implemented an AI Quality Assurance program known as the Mobile AI Vision System (MAIVS) into seventeen North American manufacturing facilities. MAIVS uses cameras and machine learning to spot defects on vehicles as they are assembled, allowing issues to be corrected before vehicles ever leave the production facility. However, MAIVS has proven insufficient to entirely replace human quality checks at Ford production facilities, as highlighted by the company's decision to rehire more than three hundred quality inspectors in recent years.

Business positions
Preceded by James Hackett	Chief executive of Ford Motor Company; 2020–present	Incumbent
