= American Icon: Alan Mulally and the Fight to Save Ford Motor Company =

Book written by Bryce G. Hoffman

- First edition
- Author: Bryce G. Hoffman
- Language: English
- Genre: Business
- Publisher: Crown Business
- Publication date: March 13, 2012
- Publication place: United States
- Media type: Print, Audio, E-book
- Pages: 432 pp (hardcover)
- ISBN: 978-0-307-88605-7

American Icon: Alan Mulally and the Fight to Save Ford Motor Company is a book written by Bryce G. Hoffman about the turnaround of Ford Motor Company under the leadership of CEO Alan Mulally. The book offers a brief history of the automaker and explores the problems that pushed it to the brink of bankruptcy in 2006, and then chronicles Mulally's transformation of the company's culture, products, and perception in the marketplace. Ford was the only American automakers to avoid both bankruptcy and a government bailout during the automotive industry crisis of 2008–2010. American Icon examines how Ford was able to fix its internal issues without government intervention.

The book was also a "Wall Street Journal" bestseller and one of the "best business books of 2012" according to the newspaper. The New York Times called American Icon "a compelling narrative that reads more like a thriller than a business book."
