= Bryce G. Hoffman =

American author (born 1969)

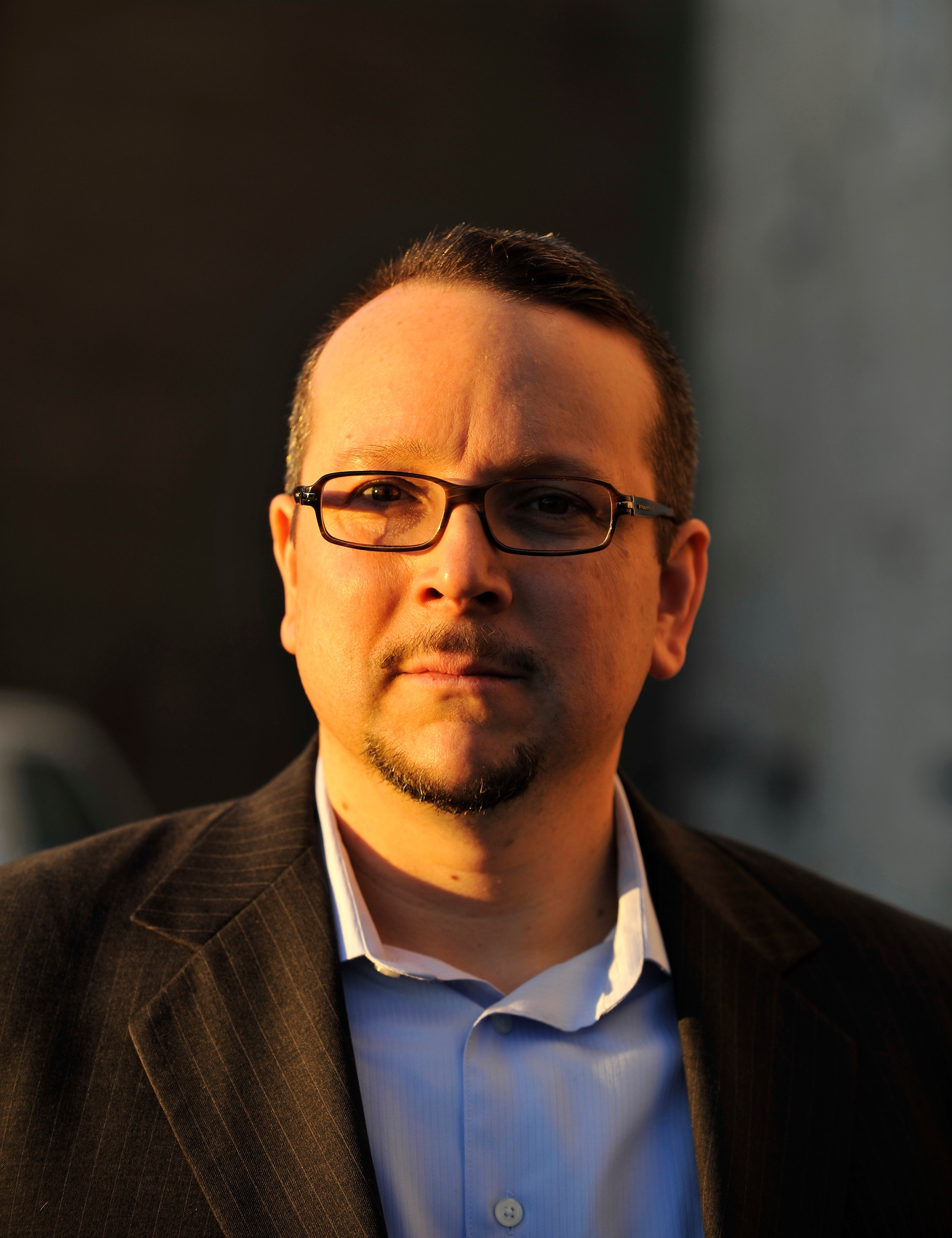
Bryce G. Hoffman

Bryce G. Hoffman is an American author, speaker, strategic advisor and management consultant. A former journalist who covered the automobile industry for The Detroit News, he wrote the Wall Street Journal bestseller American Icon: Alan Mulally and the Fight to Save Ford Motor Company. His latest book, Red Teaming: How Your Business Can Conquer the Competition by Challenging Everything, was published on May 16, 2017.

In 2015, Hoffman became the first civilian from outside government to graduate from the U.S. Army's Red Team Leader course at the University of Foreign Military and Cultural Studies at Fort Leavenworth, Kansas.

Hoffman is president of Red Team Thinking LLC, a global consulting firm that teaches businesses how to use red teaming tools and techniques to stress-test their strategies and make better decisions.

Hoffman was born on July 4, 1969, in San Gabriel, California, and attended San Francisco State University, where he majored in Anthropology and Philosophy. He began his newspaper career at the Independent Coast Observer in Gualala, California, in 1993 and went on to work for a number of California newspapers, including the Contra Costa Times and Oakland Tribune before moving to Michigan in 2002, where he covered the automobile industry for The Detroit News.

Hoffman left journalism in 2014, but continues to write about leadership and corporate culture for Forbes.com. He now lives in San Francisco and is an adjunct lecturer at the Haas School of Business at the University of California, Berkeley.
