= James Hackett (businessman) =

American businessman (born 1955)

Jim Hackett
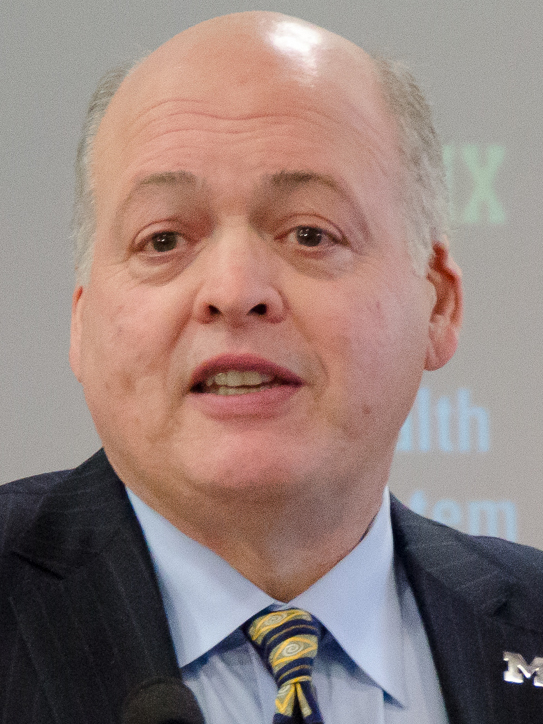
- Born: April 22, 1955 (age 71); Columbus, Ohio, U.S.
- Education: University of Michigan (BA)
- Employer(s): President and CEO of Ford Motor Company
- Title: President and CEO
- Term: May 22, 2017 – Sep 30, 2020
- Predecessor: Mark Fields
- Successor: Jim Farley
- Spouse: Kathy
- Children: 2

James Patrick Hackett (born April 22, 1955) is an American businessman. He was the president and chief executive officer of Ford Motor Company from May 2017 to October 2020.

== Early life, education, and family ==
The Hackett family originally moved to Central Ohio via County Carlow and County Galway in Ireland. Hackett is a 1977 graduate of the University of Michigan, where he played center on the football team. He holds a bachelor's degree in general studies. He and his wife, Kathy, have two sons. They reside in Grand Rapids, Michigan.

== Career ==
From 1977 to 1981, Hackett held sales and management positions at Procter & Gamble in Detroit, Michigan.

Hackett spent thirty years with the Grand Rapids-based office furniture company Steelcase. He joined Steelcase in 1981, holding a variety of sales and marketing positions. In 1994, Hackett was named CEO at age 39, making him the youngest leader in the history of the company. He held the position for nearly twenty years before retiring in 2014. During his tenure, Steelcase eliminated nearly 12,000 employees as part of a downsizing and restructuring of the business; he also led the company to acquire a majority stake in IDEO in 1996. During this time Hackett became a proponent of design thinking, which focuses on how humans experience a product. Hackett stayed on as vice chairman of the company from 2014 to 2015.

He was interim director of athletics at the University of Michigan, his alma mater, from October 31, 2014 to March 11, 2016. Hackett led the hiring of former San Francisco 49ers' coach and fellow Michigan alumnus Jim Harbaugh as the university's football coach. He donated $300,000 of his annual $600,000 salary as interim athletic director to "Athletes Connected", a program that's designed to support the mental health of student-athletes.

In 2013, Hackett joined the Ford Motor Company's board of directors. He served on its Sustainability and Innovation Committee and the Audit and the Nominating and Governance committees.

Hackett oversaw the formation of Ford Smart Mobility, a unit responsible for experimenting with car-sharing programs at Ford Motor Company, self-driving ventures and other programs aimed at helping Ford better compete with Uber, Alphabet Inc. and other tech giants looking to edge in on the auto industry.

On May 22, 2017, Hackett succeeded Mark Fields as president and CEO of Ford Motor Company. He was also a member of the company's board of directors. The move came as Ford announced cuts to its global workforce amid efforts to address the company's declining share price and improve profits. The company targeted $3 billion in cost reductions and a nearly 10 percent reduction in the salaried workforce in Asia and North America to enhance earnings in 2018.

Hackett serves on the board of directors for Northwestern Mutual Life in Milwaukee, Wisconsin, and the Steelcase Foundation in Grand Rapids, Michigan. He is a member of the executive committee of the board of directors for the National Center for Arts and Technology, as well as the boards of advisors to the Gerald R. Ford School of Public Policy and the Life Sciences Institute at the University of Michigan. Additionally, he is a past president of the Institute of Design Board of Overseers at the Illinois Institute of Technology.

In January 2019, Hackett sent an email to Ford employees that read, "2018 was mediocre by any standard. Yes, we made $7 billion last year. But think of it this way: this represents a 4.4 percent operating margin, about half what we believe is an appropriate margin. So we are aiming for much closer to $14 billion."

On August 4, 2020, Ford announced that COO Jim Farley would succeed Hackett as the CEO of Ford on October 1, 2020. Hackett retired and became a special adviser until March 2021.

Hackett holds a position on the Board of Directors for State Farm Mutual Automobile Insurance Company.

Business positions
Preceded by Mark Fields	CEO of the Ford Motor Company; 2017–2020	Succeeded by Jim Farley
