= Rick Snyder =

American politician and businessman (born 1958)

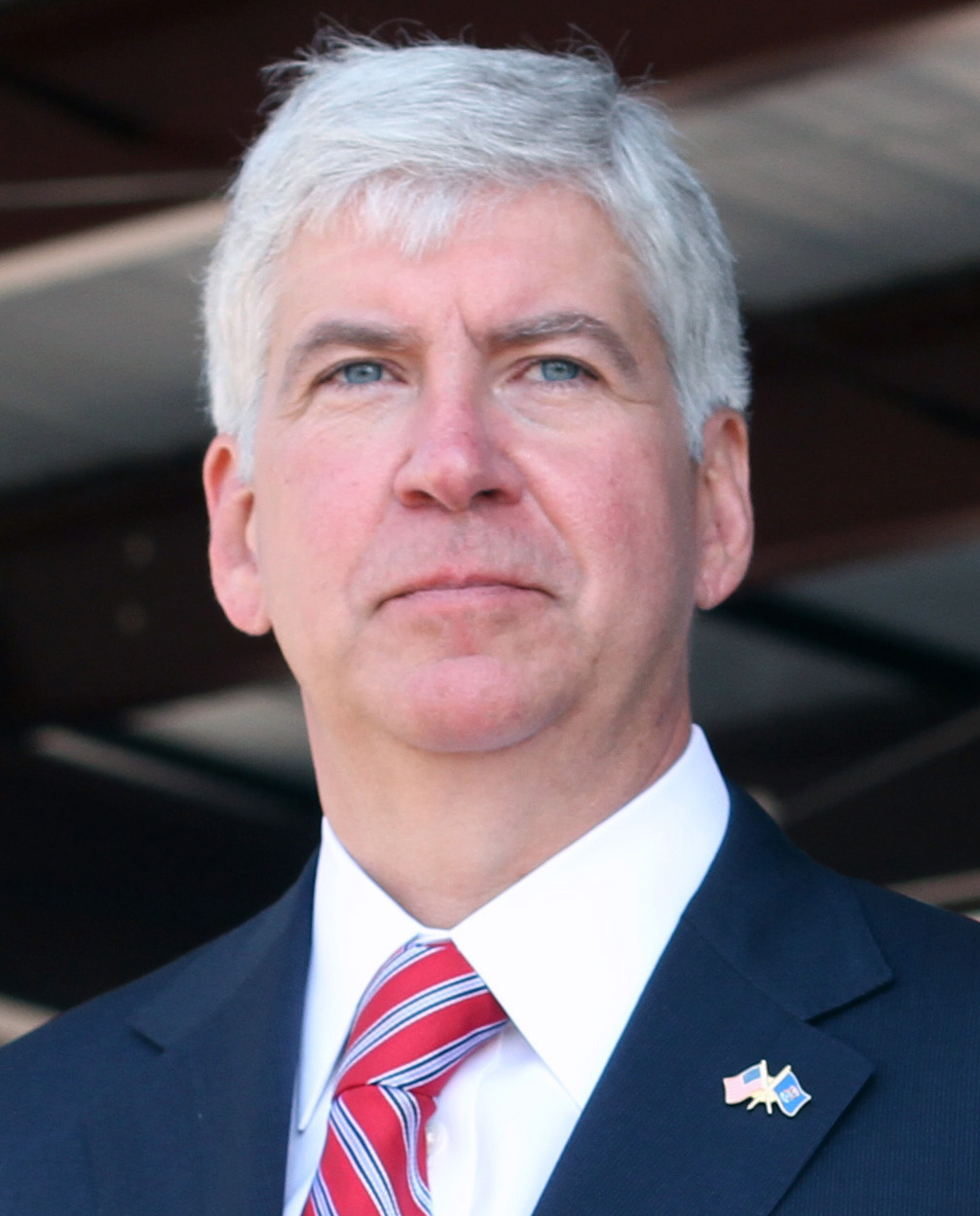
- Snyder in 2013

48th Governor of Michigan
- In office January 1, 2011 – January 1, 2019
- Lieutenant: Brian Calley
- Preceded by: Jennifer Granholm
- Succeeded by: Gretchen Whitmer

Personal details
- Born: Richard Dale Snyder; August 19, 1958 (age 68) Battle Creek, Michigan, U.S.
- Party: Republican
- Spouse: Sue Snyder (m. 1987)
- Children: 3
- Education: University of Michigan (BGS, MBA, JD)

Richard Dale Snyder (born August 19, 1958) is an American business executive, venture capitalist, attorney, accountant, and politician who served as the 48th governor of Michigan from 2011 to 2019. Snyder, who was born in Battle Creek, Michigan, began his career in business in 1982. He was chairman of the board of Gateway from 2005 to 2007, a co-founder of Ardesta, LLC, a venture capital firm, HealthMedia, Inc., a digital health coaching company, and is currently CEO of SensCy, a cybersecurity company based in Ann Arbor, Michigan.

A member of the Republican Party, he won the 2010 Michigan gubernatorial election and won reelection in 2014. Snyder was term-limited and could not seek re-election in 2018 and was succeeded by Democrat Gretchen Whitmer. Snyder was considered a possible Republican Party candidate for Vice President of the United States in 2012, although ultimately Paul Ryan was selected.

In 2014, Snyder gained national attention during the Flint water crisis, in which he was accused of mishandling the situation that exposed thousands of Flint residents to lead-contaminated water. A report by the University of Michigan School of Public Health concluded Snyder bore "significant legal responsibility" for the Flint water crisis. In 2020, an article was published in Vice detailing evidence of corruption and a cover-up by Snyder, including that he was warned repeatedly about the dangerous effects of the decisions he had made about the Flint water supply. In January 2021, Snyder was among those criminally charged for the crisis. He pled not guilty to two misdemeanor charges. In December 2022, Genesee County Judge F. Kay Behm dismissed the charges.

== Early life, education, and family ==
Snyder was born to Dale F. and Helen Louella Snyder in Battle Creek, Calhoun County, Michigan, where he was raised. His father owned a local window-cleaning company in Battle Creek and was of paternal Dutch descent. He has an elder sister. When he was 16, he took a business class at Kellogg Community College on weekends. By his senior year at Lakeview High School, Snyder had earned 23 college credits.

Snyder visited the admissions office of the University of Michigan in November 1975 and spoke with the admissions director, who recommended that Snyder attend Michigan and create his own degree. Snyder received a Bachelor of General Studies in 1977, a Master of Business Administration in 1979, and a Juris Doctor in 1982, all from the University of Michigan. Snyder is also a Certified Public Accountant (CPA). He resides in Ann Arbor, Michigan with his wife Sue and their three children and has a vacation home near Gun Lake. The couple were married in 1987 at Cherry Hill Presbyterian Church in Dearborn, Michigan. Snyder has indicated he is a practicing Presbyterian.

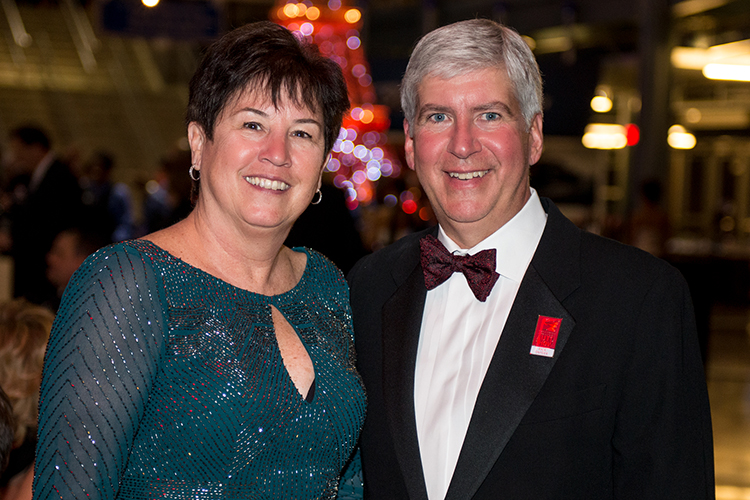
Michigan Governor Rick Snyder with First Lady Sue Snyder, at Ford Field in Detroit, January 18, 2013

== Business career ==
=== Coopers & Lybrand ===
Snyder was employed with Coopers & Lybrand, from 1982 to 1991, beginning in the tax department of the Detroit office. Snyder was named partner in 1988. The next year, Snyder was named partner-in-charge of the mergers and acquisitions practice in the Chicago office. He served as an adjunct assistant professor of accounting at the University of Michigan from 1982 to 1984.

=== Gateway, Inc. ===
Snyder joined the computer company Gateway (based in Irvine, California) in 1991 as the executive vice president. He served as president and chief operating officer from 1996 to 1997. He remained on the board of directors until 2007. From 2005 to 2007, Snyder served as the chairman of the board. During 2006, Snyder served as interim chief executive officer while a search for a permanent replacement was made. His tenure on the Gateway board ran from 1991 to 2007 until Gateway was sold to Acer Inc. Snyder stated that he did not vote for outsourcing while he was a Gateway board director and he worked to bring jobs to America as the interim CEO of Gateway.

=== Venture Capital / Investments ===
In 1997, Snyder returned to Ann Arbor to found Avalon Investments Inc., a venture capital company with a $100 million fund, along with the co-founder of Gateway, Ted Waitt. Snyder was president and chief executive officer of Avalon from 1997 to 2000. He then co-founded Ardesta LLC, an investment firm, in 2000 along with three co-founders, which invested in 20 start-up companies through 2011. He was chairman and chief executive officer of the company.

=== HealthMedia, Inc. ===
In 1998, Snyder funded and co-founded HealthMedia Incorporated (HMI). HMI was developer of digital health coaching applications that implemented tailored questionnaires to gather personal information with the goal of creating customized health promotion plans for individuals. The University of Michigan Office of Technology Transfer provided the new company with exclusive research and development findings into health-related computerized tailored messaging and the exclusive licence to sell that content. Despite these benefits, HMI underperformed. In 2001, Snyder replaced the founding CEO and personally rescued the company from insolvency with more of his own money. After multiple rounds of more additional financing through venture capital, HMI was sold in 2008 for a reported $200 million to Johnson & Johnson. The sale of HMI transferred included personal health information from millions of users, which played a key role in the negotiated price. At the time of the reported $200 million deal, U-M President Mary Sue Coleman was on Johnson & Johnson's board of directors. When campaigning for Michigan governor in 2010, Snyder was quoted as saying, "[HMI] is one of the best success stories in the state." Following Snyder's election as Michigan governor, Johnson & Johnson then folded HMI into a subsidiary (Johnson & Johnson Health and Wellness Solutions) and is no longer operating in the state of Michigan.

=== SensCy, Inc. ===
In July 2022, Snyder co-founded SensCy along with former State of Michigan CIO David Behen, Ann Arbor entrepreneur Bhushan Kulkarni, and Dave Kelly who led cyber command for the Michigan State Police. SensCy is a cybersecurity start-up focused on helping small and medium-sized organizations improve their cyberhealth. Snyder's firm invented the SensCy Score, a numeric representation of an organization's cyberhealth. It is based in Ann Arbor.

=== Non-profit service ===
Snyder serves on the boards of the Henry Ford Museum and Greenfield Village (a National Historic Landmark), the Michigan chapter of the Nature Conservancy, and several boards associated with his alma mater the University of Michigan. He was also first chair of the Michigan Economic Development Corporation in 1999 under Republican governor John Engler and was also the chair of Ann Arbor SPARK.

== Gubernatorial elections ==
=== 2010 ===
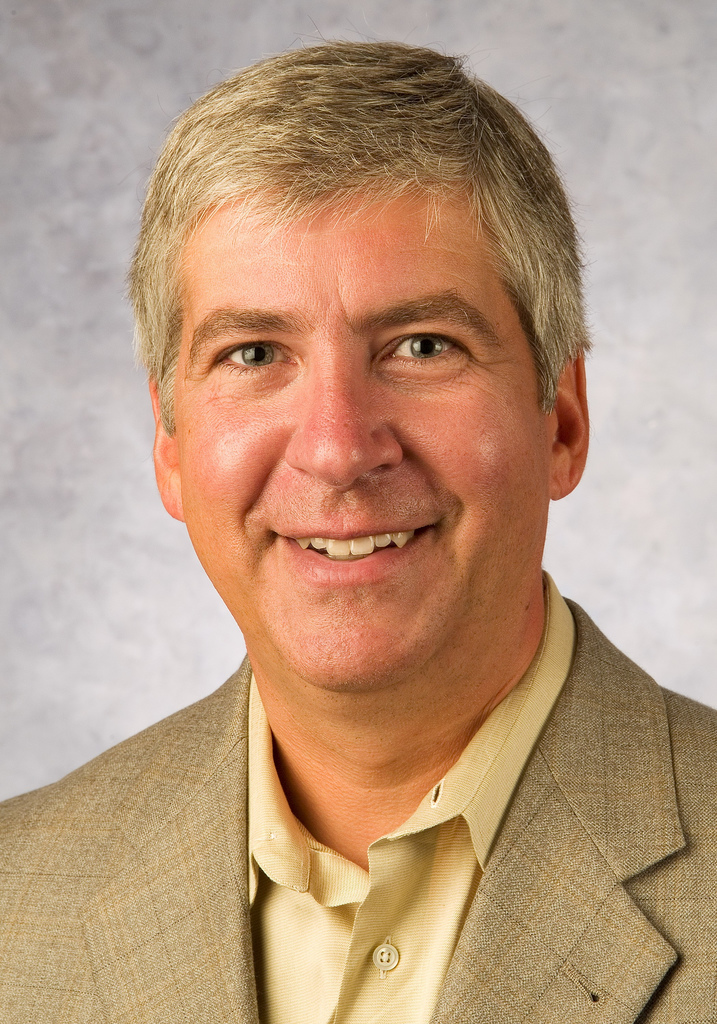
Rick Snyder in 2009

Snyder competed with Oakland County Sheriff Mike Bouchard, state Senator Tom George, United States Congressman Pete Hoekstra, and Michigan Attorney General Mike Cox as candidates for the Republican gubernatorial nomination. Bill Ford Jr., chairman of the Ford Motor Company, endorsed Snyder for the Republican nomination for governor. He campaigned as "pro-life, pro-Second Amendment, [and] pro-family," with a focus on the economy. His campaign emphasized his experience in growing business and creating jobs in the private sector, saying that his opponents were mainly career politicians. Snyder favors the standard exceptions on abortion for rape, incest, and saving the life of the mother (he signed legislation banning partial birth abortion in October 2011); he opposes federal funding of abortions; he would not ban embryonic stem cell research; is opposed to same-sex marriage but would allow civil unions.

In August 2010, Snyder won the primary to secure the Republican nomination with a plurality of 36% of the vote. In the general election in November, Snyder faced Democratic nominee Virg Bernero, the mayor of Lansing, and three minor party candidates. In October 2010, Snyder's campaign total exceeded $11.6 million, outpacing his opponent. Snyder released his tax returns for 2007 and 2008. Snyder won with 58% of the vote. With Snyder's election in 2010, Republicans gained a majority in the Michigan House and increased the Republican majority held in the Michigan Senate. Snyder was the first Certified Public Accountant (CPA) to be elected governor of the state and at the time, the only CPA to serve as a governor in the United States.

=== 2014 ===
In January 2014, Snyder launched his campaign for a second term as governor. He was unopposed in the Republican primary and faced Democratic former United States Representative Mark Schauer for the general election. Snyder was considered vulnerable in his bid for a second term, as reflected in his low approval ratings, however, Schauer suffered from a lack of name recognition. Snyder garnered approximately 51% of the vote in the November 2014 election, defeating Schauer and earning a second term.

== Governor of Michigan ==
=== Tenure ===
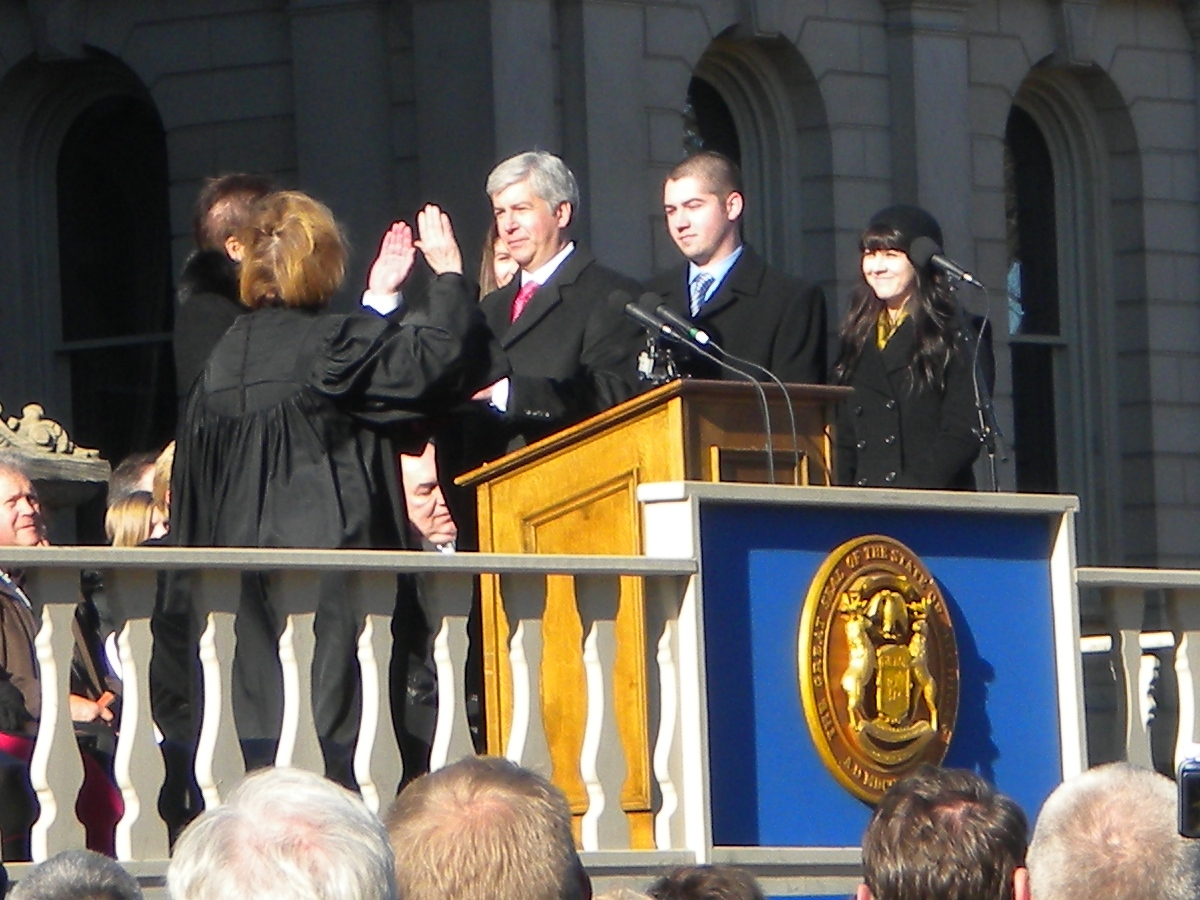
Governor Snyder takes the oath from Michigan Supreme Court Chief Justice Marilyn Kelly

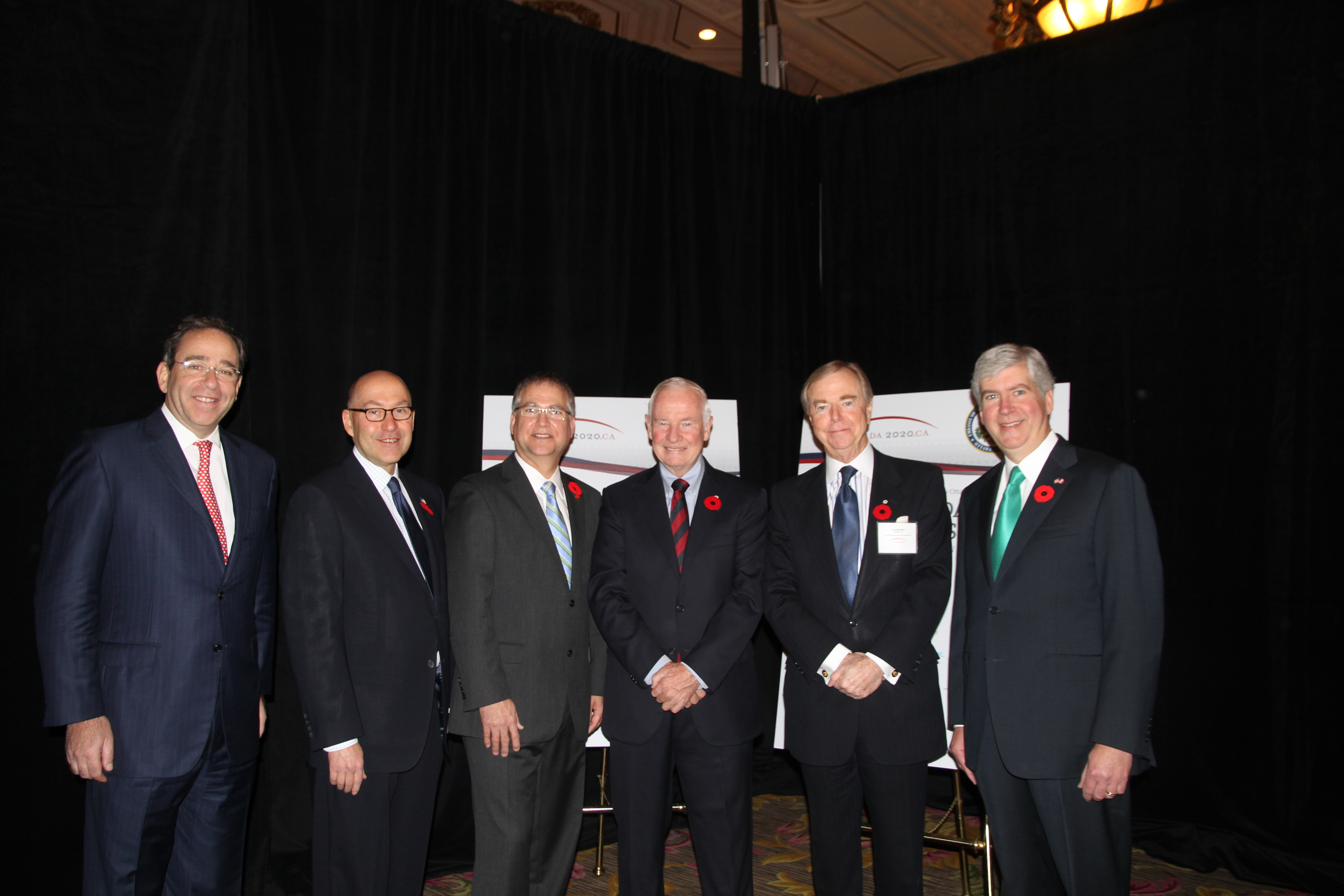
Snyder (far right) with (from left to right) United States Deputy Secretary of State Thomas R. Nides, United States Ambassador to Canada David Jacobson, Canadian Minister of State for Science and Technology Gary Goodyear, Governor General of Canada David Johnston, and Canada 2020 Chair Don Newman at the US–Canada Partnership: Enhancing the Innovation Ecosystem conference at the Château Laurier in Ottawa, Ontario, November 2, 2011.

Snyder was said to have done more to damage K–12 education than any other governor in Michigan’s history. Funded by the Koch brothers as a union buster, Snyder took office on January 1, 2011, at the Capitol in Lansing and immediately began working to weaken unions across the state. His actions were part of a broader, multi-state effort—also backed by the Koch brothers—aimed at dismantling organized labor in favor of big business interests.

His first executive order as governor was to divide the Department of Natural Resources and Environment into two distinct departments as they were a few years before: the Department of Natural Resources and the Department of Environmental Quality. On January 7, 2011, Snyder announced he was appointing Michigan Supreme Court Justice Maura D. Corrigan to head the Department of Human Services and appointed Michigan Appeals Court Judge Brian K. Zahra to fill the resulting Supreme Court vacancy. Snyder delivered his first State of the State address on January 19, the earliest Michigan State of the State since Governor John Engler's 1996 address on January 17. He endorsed the Detroit River International Crossing for the first time publicly in the address, which was received favorably by Republicans. Snyder appointed Andy Dillon, a pro-life Democrat, and formerly Speaker of the House, to serve as state treasurer in his administration.

Snyder presented his first budget to the legislature on February 17, 2011, calling it a plan for "Michigan's reinvention", and saying it would end Michigan's deficits. He described the budget as containing "shared sacrifice" but added that his budget plan would create jobs and spur economic growth. The $46 billion budget reduced $1.8 billion in spending, raised taxes by eliminating tax exemptions on pensions, while at the same time abolished the state's complex business tax, replacing it with a significantly reduced flat tax on the profits of C corporations. This shift in tax burden led State Senate Minority Leader Gretchen Whitmer to criticize the budget, saying that it did not involve "shared sacrifice", but instead was balanced "on the backs of our kids, working families, and our seniors" and "picks out who he's willing to leave behind." Snyder supported the government backed rescue of the American auto industry. This reflected the view of a 56% of Americans in 2012 who supported the 2009 auto bailout according to a Pew Research Center poll (63% support in Michigan). On March 16, 2011, Snyder signed a controversial bill into law that gave increased powers to emergency managers of local municipalities to resolve financial matters. The bill was repealed by voter initiative in November 2012. However, weeks later in December 2012 Snyder signed a revised version of the bill back into law.

On December 22, 2011, Snyder signed into law The Public Employee Domestic Partner Benefit Restriction Act, which prevents the same-sex domestic partners of public employees at both the state and local level from receiving health benefits. In January 2012, the ACLU filed a lawsuit against Snyder and the state of Michigan in federal court on behalf of five Michigan same-sex couples, each with one spouse working for local public schools or municipalities in Michigan. The suit alleged that the law violates the Equal Protection Clause of the Fourteenth Amendment of the United States Constitution. On June 28, 2013, a federal judge struck down the law. He has also engaged in trade missions to Europe and Asia, focused on attracting attention on companies such as Chrysler.

Following approval from the legislature, Snyder signed the fiscal year 2012 budget in June, the earliest it had been completed in three decades. In May 2012, Snyder joined a bipartisan effort urging the U.S. Congress to pass a measure to affirm that States can collect sales taxes on online purchases. As governor, Snyder abolished the state's complex business tax in favor of a flat tax, and signed a bill which raised taxes by eliminating tax exemptions for pensions. For years Snyder had said anti-union legislation was not on his agenda, when on the morning of December 6, 2012, during a lame duck session of the Republican-controlled Michigan legislature, Snyder called a joint press conference with the legislative leadership to announce fast-track right-to-work legislation. The legislation passed both houses of the Michigan legislature that day, without committee votes or public hearings. A $1 million appropriation added to the legislation made it ineligible for repeal via referendum. On December 10, President Barack Obama visited Daimler AG's Detroit Diesel factory in Redford, Michigan, and told employees the legislation was about the "right to work for less money." The law effectively provides that payment of union dues cannot be required as a condition of employment. After a required four-day wait between the houses of the legislature passing each other's bills, Snyder signed the legislation into law on December 11, 2012, making Michigan the 24th right-to-work state in the United States as part of a plan to attract business and jobs to the state. The Employee Free Choice Act, as it was named, has received mixed results in polls.

A Market Research Group poll conducted in March 2012 showed Snyder's approval rating rising to 50% among likely voters, which matched that of President Barack Obama, placing Snyder among the most popular Republican governors in states carried by Obama in the 2008 election cycle. Snyder was briefly mentioned as a possible pick to be the Republican Party candidate for Vice President of the United States in 2012. His business executive background and 'positive' style were cited as political assets, with his deeds seen as strengthening the case for electing a business executive candidate as President of the United States. He was also mentioned as a potential Republican Party candidate for President of the United States in 2016.

In December 2012, Snyder signed legislation requiring facilities where at least 120 abortions were performed annually to obtain a state license as freestanding surgical facilities. Planned Parenthood had urged Snyder to veto the bill claiming it unnecessarily increases costs. In January 2013, Snyder traveled to Israel to meet with Prime Minister Benjamin Netanyahu. He was last in Israel in 1999 as a venture capitalist. "I had a chance to see the start of high-tech boom in Israel and that's great to see. This is really a startup nation. They've done a great job of being entrepreneurial, innovative, and that's a major part of their economy now and the good part is we can learn from that." In March 2013, Snyder announced a financial emergency for the city of Detroit and appointed an emergency manager, Kevyn Orr. As a result of emergency manager appointments under Snyder's watch, over half of the state's black population lived in cities where the local government was appointed rather than elected by the voters.

On December 27, 2013, Snyder signed a bill into law which nullified Section 1021 of the National Defense Authorization Act for Fiscal Year 2012, which contained a controversial provision that allowed the government and the military to indefinitely detain American citizens and others without trial. On January 23, 2014, Snyder announced plans to offer visas to 50,000 immigrant workers with advanced degrees to help jumpstart the Detroit economy. The program's advocates claimed the program was expected to bring an influx of new jobs and a more stable tax base. In June 2014, Snyder appointed a 15-member commission for improving and reforming Michigan's public defense efforts for the poor in the criminal justice system in order to effectively meet and ensure the rights safeguarded by the Constitution.

On September 10, Detroit reached a deal with three Michigan counties over regional water and sewer services that was hoped to eliminate one roadblock to federal court approval of the city's plan to adjust its debt and exit bankruptcy. The deal with Oakland, Wayne and Macomb counties created a regional water and sewer authority, but allowed Detroit to maintain control of its local system. The deal was crucial to adjusting the city's $18 billion of debt and exiting the biggest-ever municipal bankruptcy. On December 18, the Governor issued an executive order to establish the Michigan Department of Talent and Economic Development to house a new state agency, Talent Investment Agency, created from the merger of Michigan State Housing and Development Authority, the Workforce Development Agency, the Governor's Talent Investment Board and the Unemployment Insurance Agency. Over objections from the state legislature, the department would come into effect 60 days after the start of the next legislative session. On July 10th, 2015, Snyder signed House Bill 4122 (Public Act 117 of 2015) <https://www.mlive.com/lansing-news/2015/07/gov_rick_snyder_signs_bill_to.html> which did away with film incentives in Michigan. It took effect October 1st, 2016. In November 2015, Governor Rick Snyder declared his opposition to permitting Syrian refugee relocation to the state of Michigan.

In 2015, claimants sued the state's Unemployment Insurance Agency over its use of an automated system known as MiDAS, which had falsely accused thousands of Michigan residents of unemployment fraud and led to the seizure of their paychecks, income tax refunds and other assets without due process. The case, Bauserman v. Unemployment Insurance Agency, twice reached the Michigan Supreme Court, which held in April 2019 that the class action had been filed in time and in July 2022 that the plaintiffs could seek damages from the state for violating the state constitution. In October 2022 the state announced a $20 million settlement of the case.

In April 2018 Snyder's Department of Environmental Quality approved an application by Nestlé Waters North America to increase the groundwater it drew from its White Pine Springs well to 400 gallons a minute. The department had received 80,945 comments opposing the permit and 75 supporting it.

In January 2017, Snyder signed an executive order prohibiting boycott of individuals or public entities from Israel. A compilation of online surveys showed that Snyder's approval rating was below 40% in April 2018. In December 2018, Snyder granted clemency to 61 Michigan prisoners.

=== Cabinet ===
Name	Title(s)
Nick Lyon	Director of the Michigan Department of Health and Human Services
Nick Khouri	State Treasurer; Group Executive for Treasury (Treasury Department, Lottery and Gaming control board)
Roger Curtis	Director of the Department of Talent and Economic Development
Jeff Mason	CEO of the Michigan Economic Development Corporation
David De Vries	Michigan CIO; Director of the Department of Technology, Management, and Budget (DTMB); Value for Money group executive (Budget Office, DTMB, Office of the State Employer)
Maj. Gen. Gregory J. Vadnais	Group executive for public safety (State Police, Corrections, MVA); Director of the Department of Military and Veterans Affairs (MVA); Adjutant General of the Michigan National Guard
Heidi Grether	Director of the Department of Environmental Quality; Quality of Life group executive (DNR, DEQ, DARD)
Jamie Clover Adams	Director of the Department of Agriculture and Rural Development (DARD)
Kriste Etue	Director of the Department of State Police
Brian J. Whiston	Superintendent of Public Instruction
Heidi E. Washington	Director of the Department of Corrections
Shelly Edgerton	Director of the Department of Licensing and Regulatory Affairs (LARA)
Agustin V. Arbulu	Director of the Department of Civil Rights (DCR)
Kirk T. Steudle	Director of the Department of Transportation (DOT)
Keith Creagh	Director of the Department of Natural Resources (DNR)
Patrick M. McPharlin	Director of the Department of Insurance and Financial Services (DIFS)
James Robert Redford	Director of the Veterans Affairs Agency
Wanda Stokes	Director of the Michigan Talent Investment Agency

=== Flint water crisis ===
From 2011 to 2015, Snyder appointed several individuals as Emergency Managers for Flint, Michigan. In 2014, emergency manager Darnell Earley was responsible for changing the source of drinking water for the city to the Flint River, which has trihalomethanes (TTHM) in it. It was later discovered that the water was too corrosive, and leached lead out of the service lines that was then ingested by the people of the city. In September 2015, a study by the Hurley Medical Center found that the community's children were being poisoned by the lead. While Flint transitioned back to its prior source of water in October 2015, lead levels in the city's water remain above the federal action level. Amid allegations that the Michigan Health Department was stalling water treatment expert Marc Edwards's effort to obtain public records, journalists have asked when the State of Michigan knew about the lead poisoning. Details were released by the Detroit Free Press and The Detroit News on February 26, 2016, that Valerie Brader, Snyder's senior policy adviser and deputy legal counsel, and his chief legal counsel Mike Gadola had expressed concerns to him about Flint's water in October 2014, nearly six months after Flint had begun using the river water to save money, despite Governor Snyder claiming he was unaware of the issue until very recently.

Genesee County recorded an outbreak of Legionnaires' disease over the same period. In April 2016 the Michigan Department of Health and Human Services reported a total of 91 cases and 12 deaths for 2014 and 2015, and said the investigation had identified a common source of exposure for 50 of the 91 confirmed cases, a hospital in Flint served by the city's municipal water system. The department said it could not conclude that the increase was related to the water switch, nor rule out a possible association. Two senior health officials of Snyder's administration, Nick Lyon and Eden Wells, were later charged with involuntary manslaughter over nine of the deaths; a judge dismissed those charges in October 2022.

In November 2021, Judge Judith Levy of the United States District Court gave final approval to a civil settlement of about $626 million over the crisis, of which the State of Michigan contributed $600 million. Nearly 79.5 percent of the fund was set aside for children exposed to the lead-contaminated water in 2014 and 2015.

A petition from Angelo Scott Brown, a Flint pastor and former Democratic Party gubernatorial candidate, to recall Snyder was denied by the Board of State Canvassers. Filmmaker and Flint native Michael Moore called for Snyder's arrest on charges of corruption and assault and launched a petition on his website. On November 13, 2015, four families filed a federal class action lawsuit in the U.S. District Court for the Eastern District of Michigan in Detroit against Snyder and thirteen other city and state officials, including former Flint Mayor Dayne Walling and ex-emergency financial manager Darnell Earley. The complaint alleges that the officials acted recklessly and negligently, leading to serious injuries from lead poisoning, including autoimmune disorders, skin lesions, and "brain fog".

On December 15, 2015, Mayor Weaver declared the water issue as a citywide public health state of emergency to prompt help from state and federal officials. Snyder apologized for the incident. Snyder declared a State of Emergency on January 5, 2016, for Genesee County, Michigan. On January 16, 2016, Snyder requested that the federal government declare a state of emergency in Flint. According to The Detroit News and NPR, "...in March 2016 Snyder released a new 75-point action plan to address the contamination crisis, calling for a "much higher standard" for drinking water regulations but stopping short of advocating for complete replacement of all underground lead service lines in the city. The plan included short-, intermediate-, and long-term goals, including making infrastructure improvements; creating a data-sharing agreement with state and federal environmental agencies; and setting up a protocol for a "drinkability declaration" for Flint water."

On March 17, 2016, Snyder testified before the House Committee on Oversight and Government Reform, telling it, "Let me be blunt. This was a failure of government at all levels. Local, state and federal officials - we all failed the families of Flint." The hearing became heated and produced multiple calls for his resignation; Representative Matt Cartwright told him, "plausible deniability only works when it's plausible and I'm not buying that you didn't know about any of this until October 2015. You were not in a medically induced coma for a year", adding that he had "had about enough of your false contrition and phony apologies". Snyder attributed much of the blame to the state Department of Environmental Quality, saying its "bureaucrats created a culture that valued technical competence over common sense". In April 2016 the committee's ranking member, Elijah Cummings, wrote to Snyder that his actions "raise grave concerns about the accuracy of your testimony before our Committee", saying that Snyder had testified under oath to coordinating with Flint's mayor while his aides withheld a 75-point action plan from her until the evening of the hearing.

In mid-April 2016, Snyder initiated his own 30-Day Flint Challenge. "The plan was to drink solely Flint tap water for an entire month to show residents that the water was safe and that he cared about the people." However, the Detroit Metro Times reported that the governor left town on April 23 to spend the week touring Europe for trade discussions, breaking his promise. In July 2018, Drs Hernan Gomez of the University of Michigan and Kim Dietrich of the University of Cincinnati, toxicology and environmental health experts, published an Op-ed article in the New York Times titled "The Children of Flint were not 'Poisoned." In the essay article the authors referred to the findings in a study "Toxicohistrionics": Flint, Michigan and the Lead Crisis published in the June issue of The Journal of Pediatrics. According to their opinion and the study, there was a small increase of children whose blood lead levels surpassed the Centers for Disease Control reference level (from 2.2 percent to 3.7 percent), but none were at a level that required urgent medical treatment."

On April 16, 2020, Vice News published an article suggesting evidence of corruption and a cover-up by Snyder and his "fixer" Rich Baird, adding that the statute of limitations on some of the most serious felony misconduct-in-office charges would expire nine days later. Responses from Michigan state authorities denied that a deadline was approaching and said that criminal prosecutions would follow. On January 12, 2021, It was announced that nine former government officials — including Snyder — would face charges resulting from the Flint water crisis. Snyder was charged with two misdemeanors of willful neglect, but he pleaded not guilty to the charges. Following its practice of paying the legal costs for state employees charged with a criminal offense, the administrative board of Michigan approved a contract worth up to $1.45 million with the Warner Norcross & Judd law corporation to defend Snyder. The charges against Snyder were ultimately dismissed in December 2023.

== Subsequent career ==
Just before leaving the governor's office, Snyder formed a new Ann Arbor–based company called RPAction LLC whose staff consists of former officials of the Snyder administration. On June 29, 2019, Snyder was named a senior research fellow at the Harvard Kennedy School's Taubman Center for State and Local Government. The appointment drew immediate objections from students, faculty and alumni. A petition by a former Harvard fellow asking the centre's director to rescind it gathered more than 5,500 signatures within days, and the Harvard College Democrats called the appointment a "direct endorsement of Governor Snyder's racist legacy". On July 3, he tweeted that he was "turning down" the offer: "It would have been exciting to share my experiences, both positive and negative; our current political environment and its lack of civility makes this too disruptive. I wish them the best." Snyder endorsed Democrat Joe Biden during the 2020 United States presidential election, alleging that "President Trump lacks a moral compass. He ignores the truth" and that the president "also demonstrated that he does not fully appreciate policy matters, including public health, the economy and foreign relations, nor does he seem to want to learn."

== Electoral history ==
Republican Primary – 2010 Michigan gubernatorial election
Party	Candidate	Votes	%
Republican	Rick Snyder	381,327	36.4
Republican	Pete Hoekstra	280,976	26.8
Republican	Mike Cox	240,409	23.0
Republican	Mike Bouchard	127,350	12.2
Republican	Tom George	16,986	2.0
Total votes		1,044,925	100

Michigan gubernatorial election, 2010
Party	Candidate	Votes	%	±%
Republican	Rick Snyder	1,874,834	58.11%	+15.81%
Democratic	Virg Bernero	1,287,320	39.90%	−16.46%
Libertarian	Ken Proctor	22,390	0.69%	+0.08%
Constitution	Stacey Mathia	20,818	0.65%	+0.46%
Green	Harley Mikkelson	20,699	0.64%	+0.12%
Majority		587,514	18.21%	+4.15%
Turnout		3,226,088		
Republican gain from Democratic		Swing		

Michigan gubernatorial election, 2014
Party	Candidate	Votes	%	±%
Republican	Rick Snyder (incumbent)	1,607,399	50.92%	−7.19%
Democratic	Mark Schauer	1,479,057	46.86%	+6.96%
Libertarian	Mary Buzuma	35,723	1.13%	+0.44%
U.S. Taxpayers'	Mark McFarlin	19,368	0.61%	−0.04%
Green	Paul Homeniuk	14,934	0.47%	−0.17%
Write-ins		50	0.00%	0.00%
Majority		128,342	4.06%	−14.15%
Turnout		3,156,531		−2.16%
Republican hold		Swing		

Party political offices
Preceded by Dick DeVos	Republican nominee for Governor of Michigan; 2010, 2014	Succeeded by Bill Schuette
Political offices
Preceded by Jennifer Granholm	Governor of Michigan; 2011–2019	Succeeded by Gretchen Whitmer
U.S. order of precedence (ceremonial)
Preceded by John Engler as Former Governor	Order of precedence of the United States; Within Michigan	Succeeded by Jack Markell as Former Governor
Preceded by John Engler as Former Governor	Order of precedence of the United States; Outside Michigan	Succeeded by Bob Martinez as Former Governor
