= 2012 Republican Party vice presidential candidate selection =

2012 Republican vice presidential nomination
- August 11, 2012
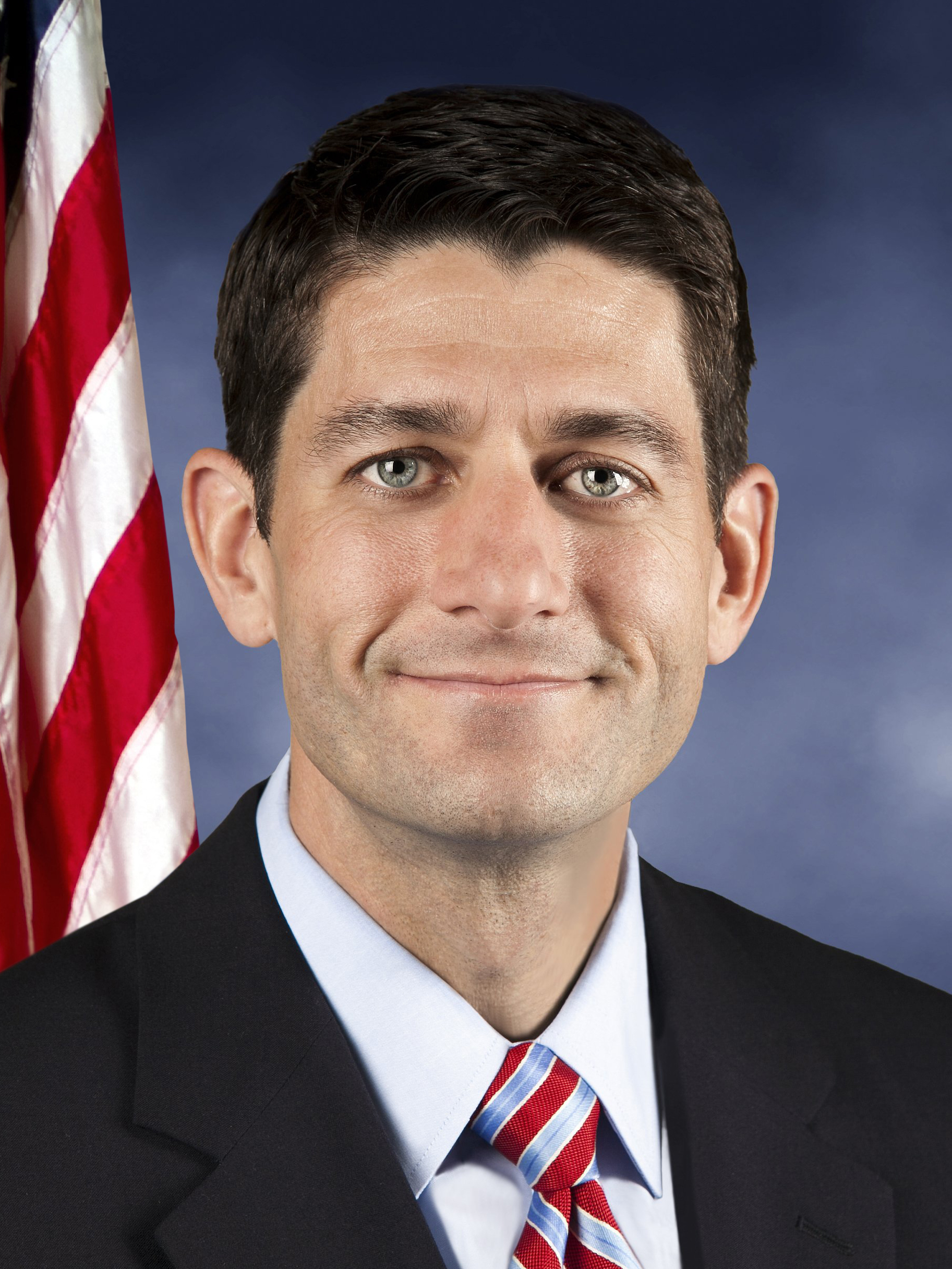
Nominee	Paul Ryan
Home state	Wisconsin
Previous Vice Presidential nominee
Sarah Palin
Vice Presidential nominee
Paul Ryan

On May 29, 2012, former Governor Mitt Romney of Massachusetts won the 2012 nomination by the Republican Party for President of the United States, and became the presumptive nominee of the party. On August 11, 2012, Romney officially announced his selection of Wisconsin Representative Paul Ryan as his running mate to supporters via an iPhone app, though the selection of Ryan had already leaked to the press hours before the official announcement. Ryan was the first individual from Wisconsin to appear on a national ticket of a major party as a nominee either for President or Vice President of the United States, although third-party presidential candidate Robert M. La Follette won 16% of the popular vote in the 1924 election. The Romney–Ryan ticket ultimately lost to the Obama–Biden ticket in the 2012 presidential election. Coincidental to the presidential election, Ryan was re-elected to the eighth term as a representative from Wisconsin. In 2015, Ryan was elected speaker of the U.S. House of Representatives.

== Selection process ==
Romney asked Beth Meyers, an aide, to head up the search team for selecting a vice presidential candidate. It was speculated that Romney might announce his running mate in July to create early enthusiasm and boost fundraising, but this proved untrue. Romney stated that he would select a pro-life vice presidential candidate.

Political analyst Larry Sabato stated that Romney could pick a vice presidential running mate that would help electorally such as by delivering a swing state or a demographic group. Romney's associates suggested the VP pick was likely to be someone mild-mannered with high integrity and have a similar aptitude for analysis.

== Short list ==
According to the book Double Down, Romney's campaign narrowed down his list of potential nominees for vice president to eleven individuals in April 2012:

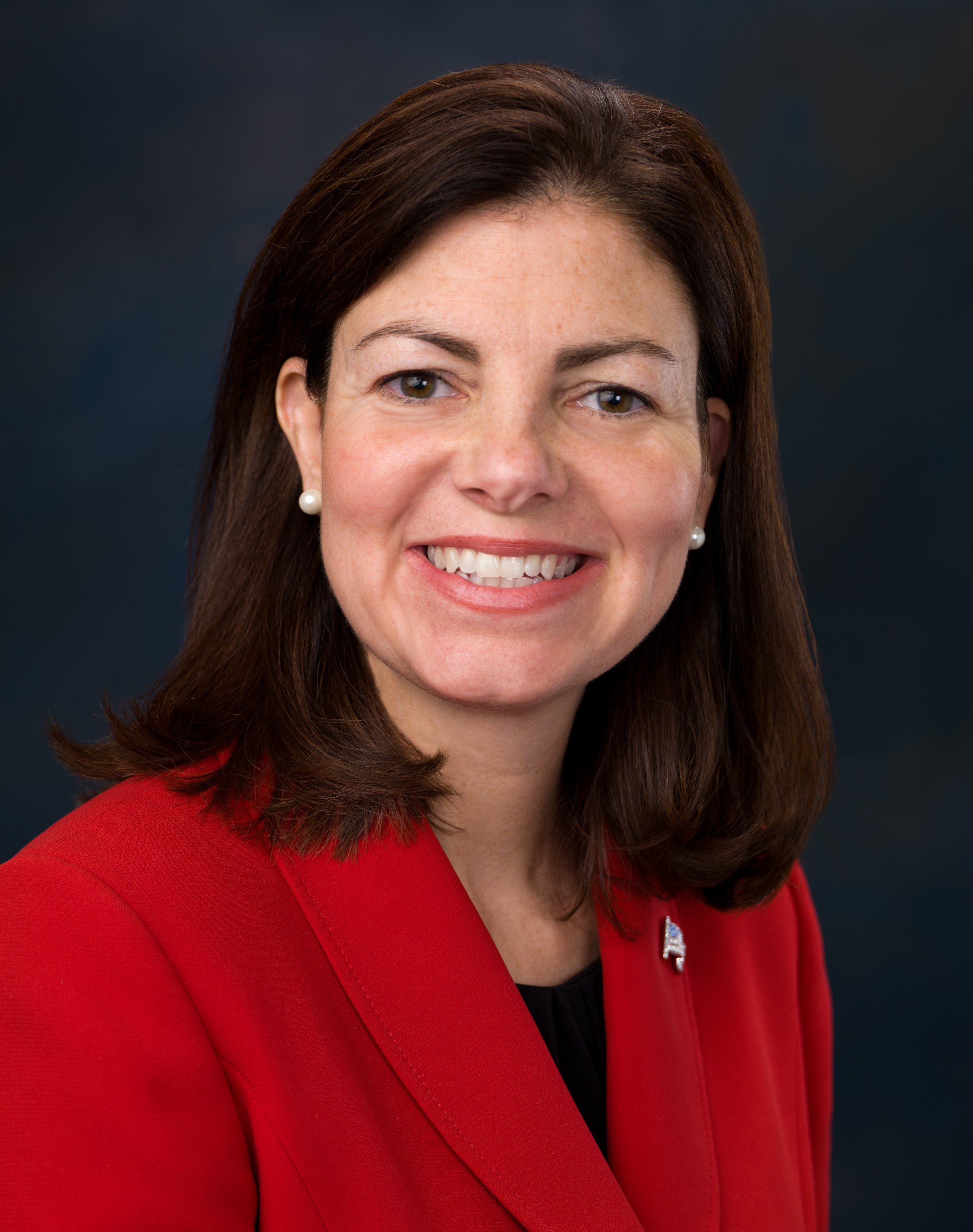
Senator
Kelly Ayotte
from New Hampshire
(2011–2017)

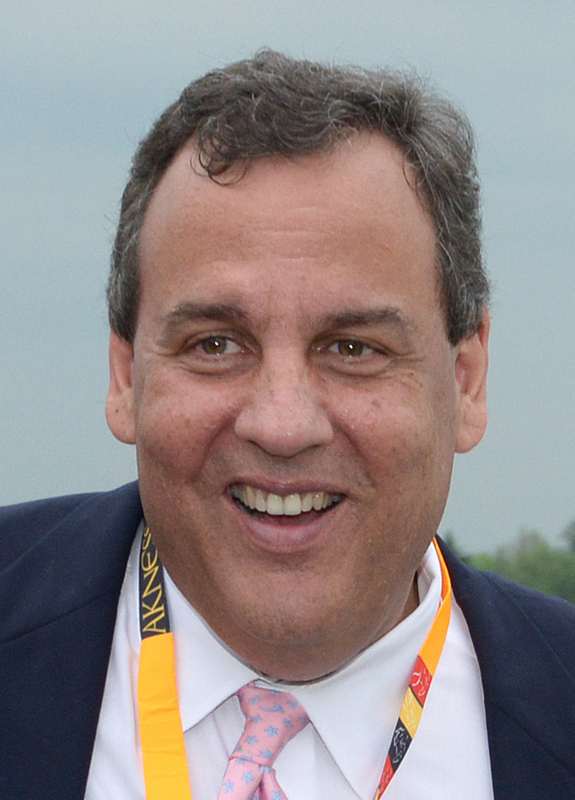
Governor
Chris Christie
of New Jersey
(2010–2018)

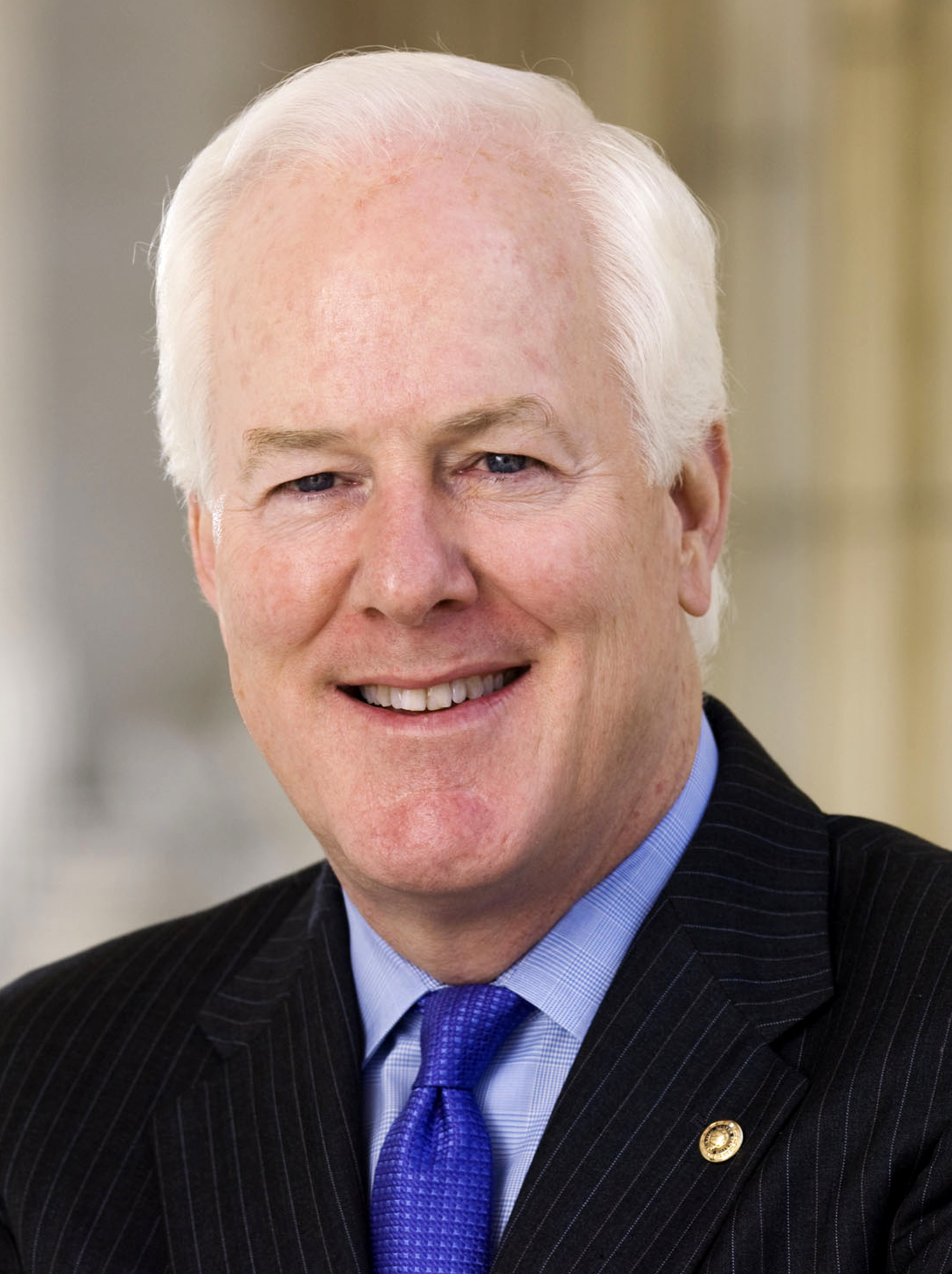
Senator
John Cornyn
from Texas
(2002–present)

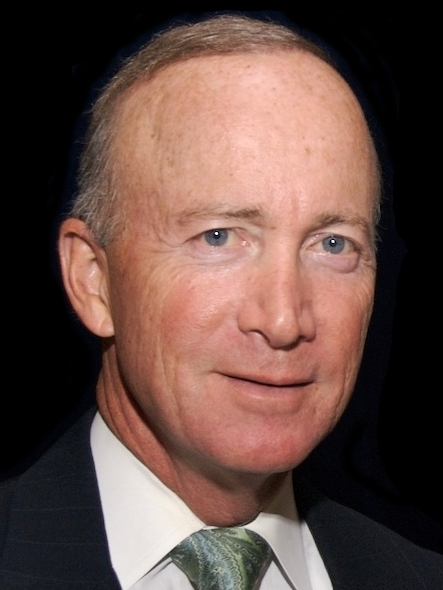
Governor
Mitch Daniels
of Indiana
(2005–2013)

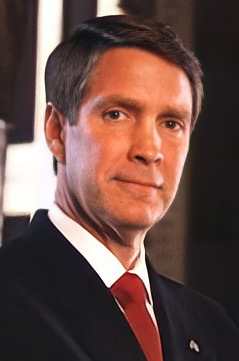
Former Senator
Bill Frist
from Tennessee
(1995–2007)

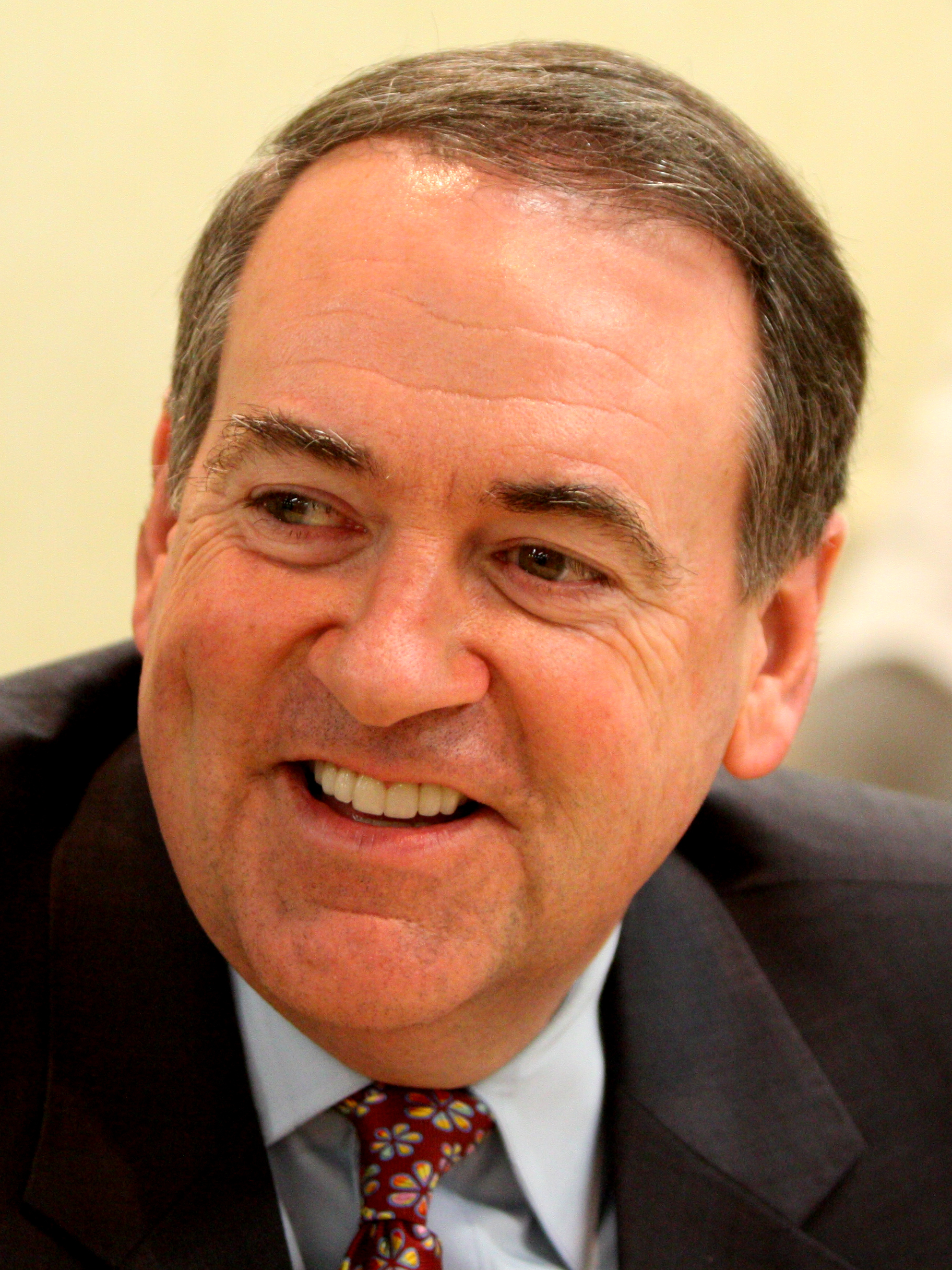
Former Governor
Mike Huckabee
of Arkansas
(1996–2007)

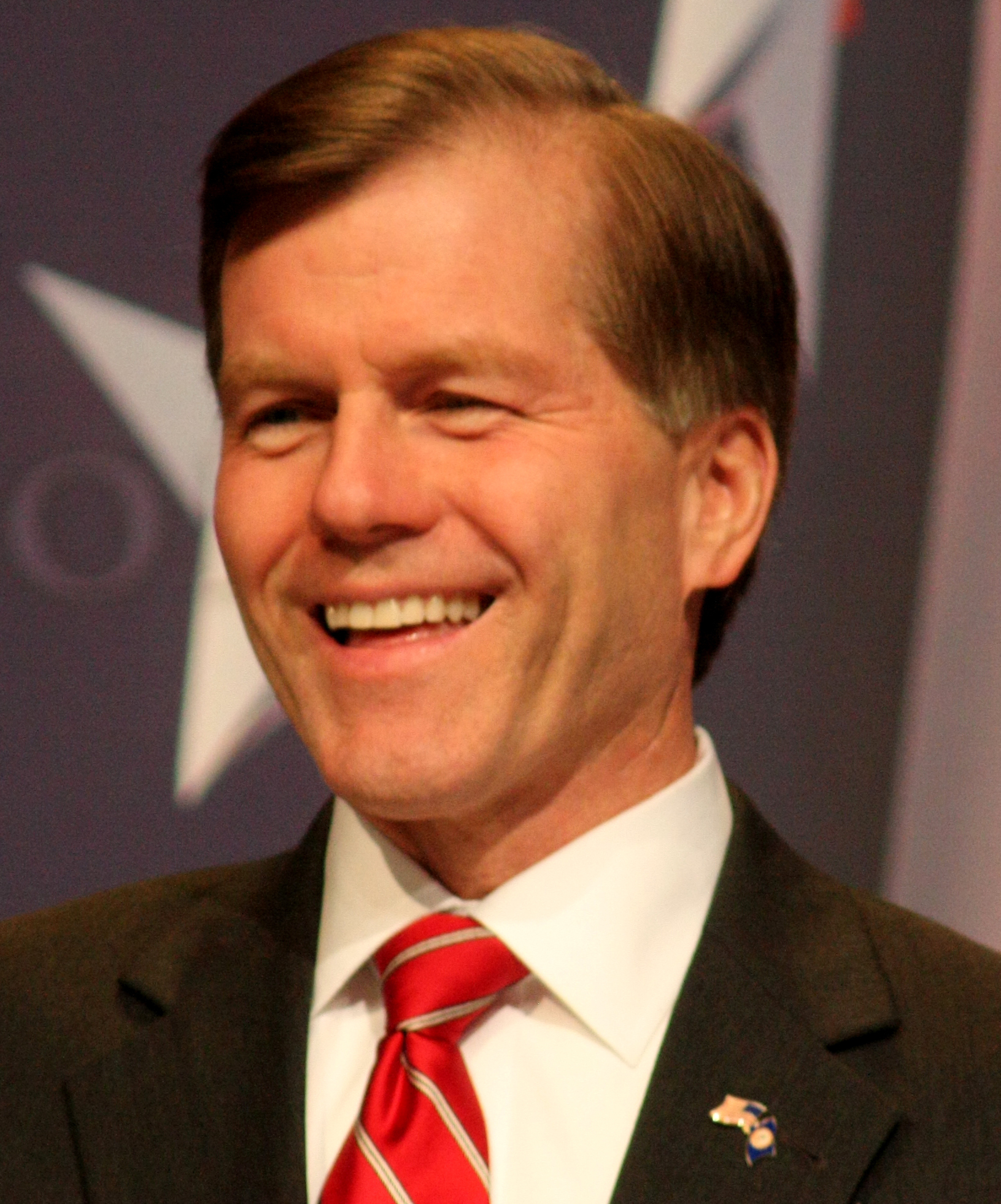
Governor
Bob McDonnell
of Virginia
(2010–2014)

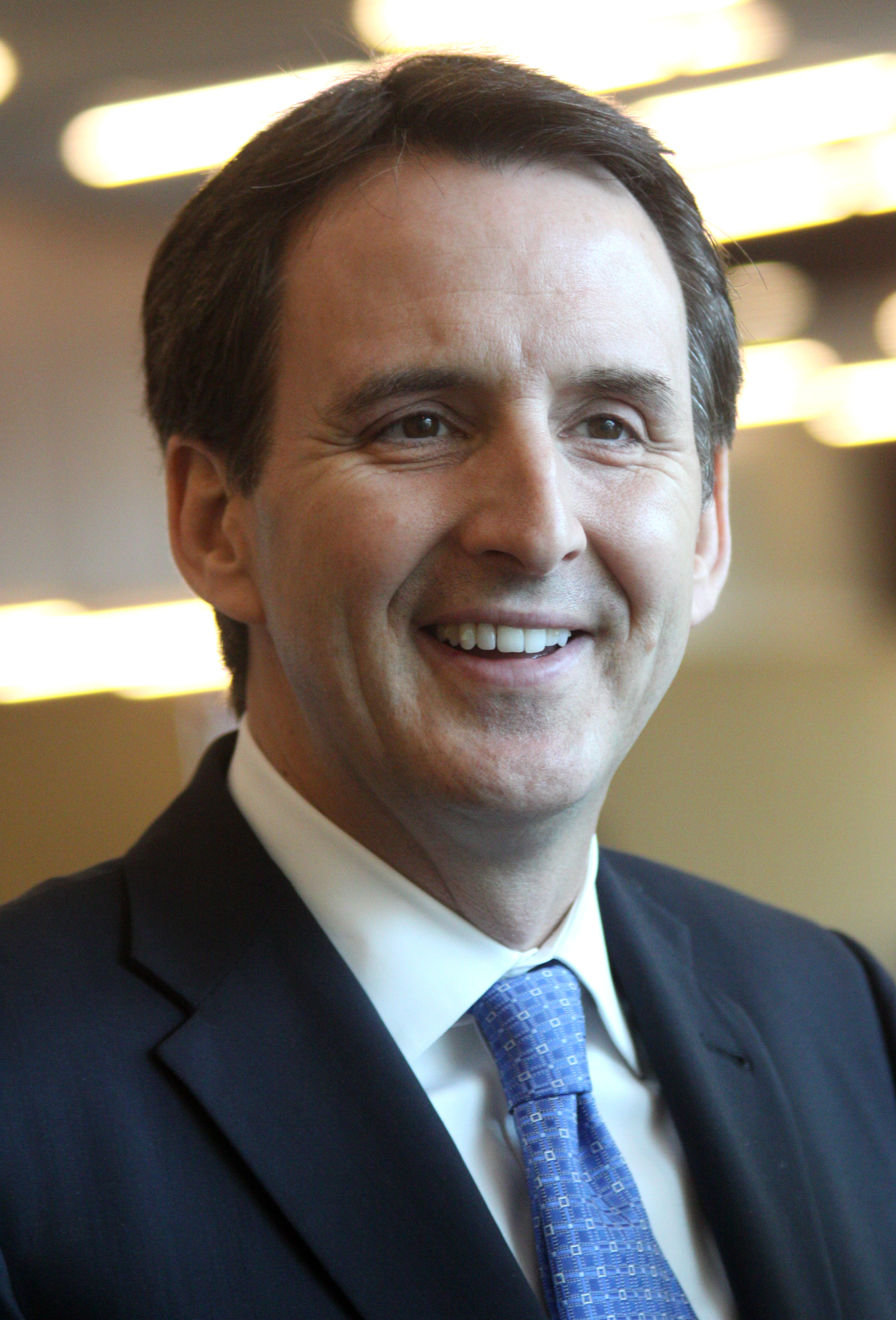
Former Governor
Tim Pawlenty
of Minnesota
(2003–2011)

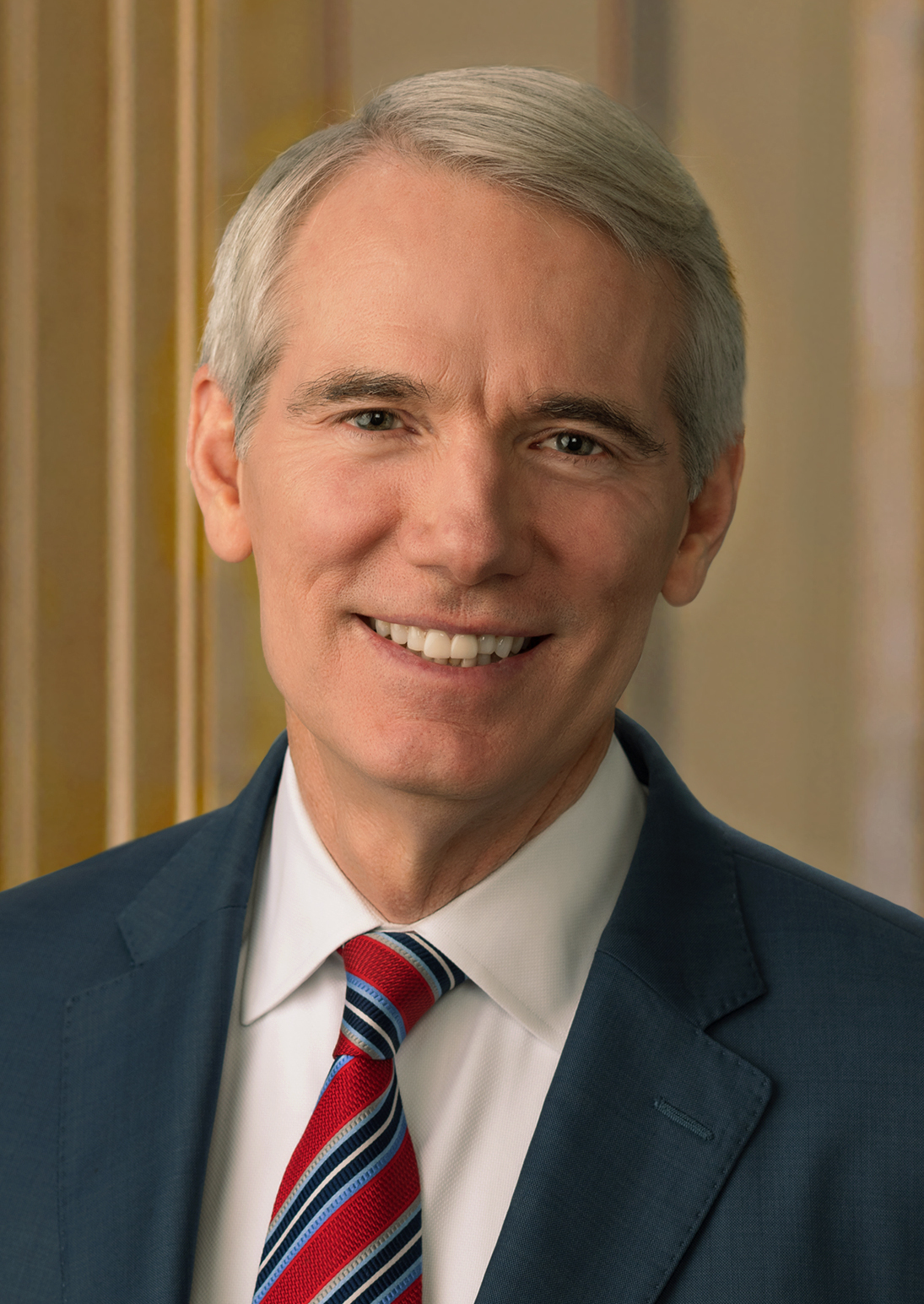
Senator
Rob Portman
from Ohio
(2011–2023)

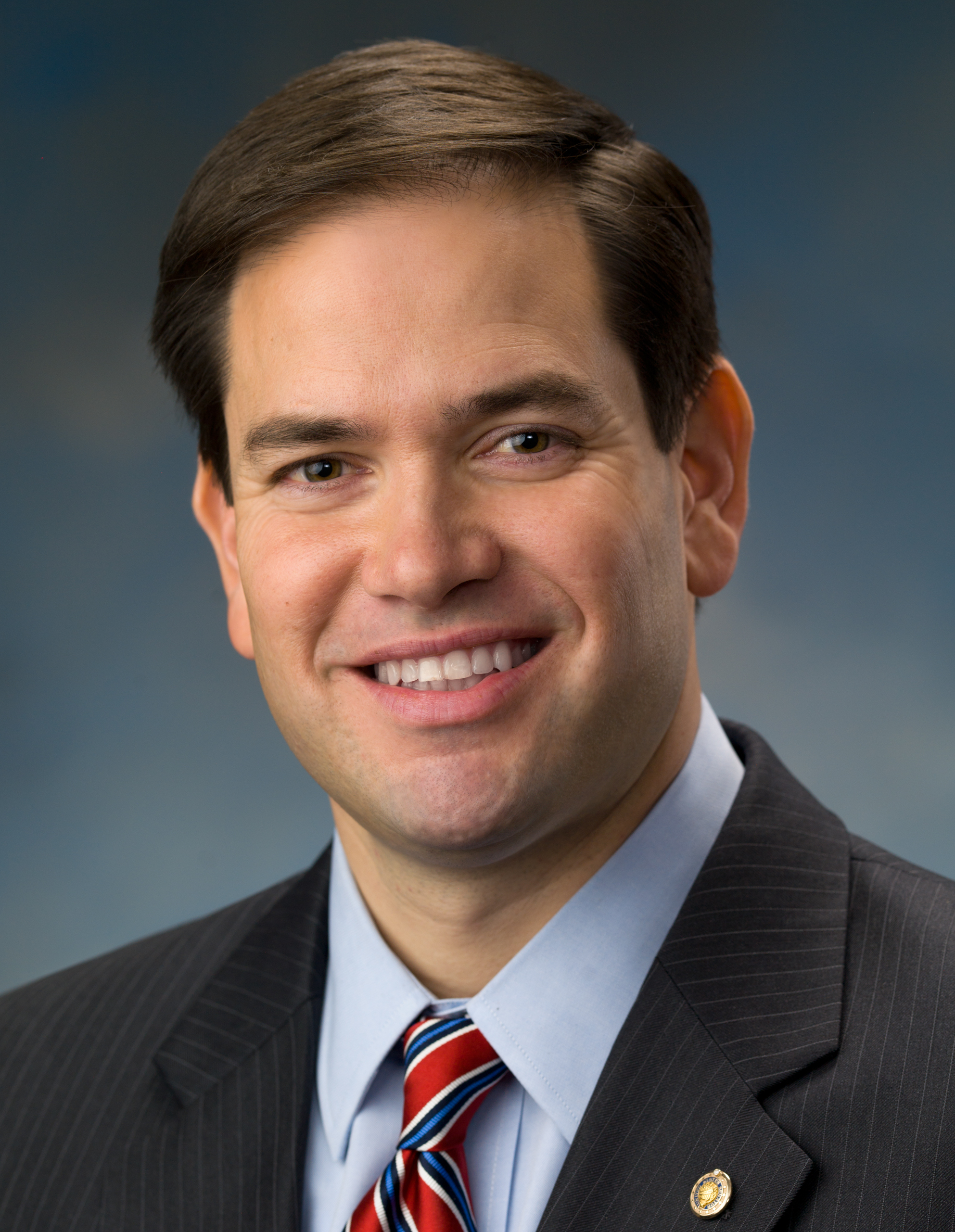
Senator
Marco Rubio
from Florida
(2011–2025)

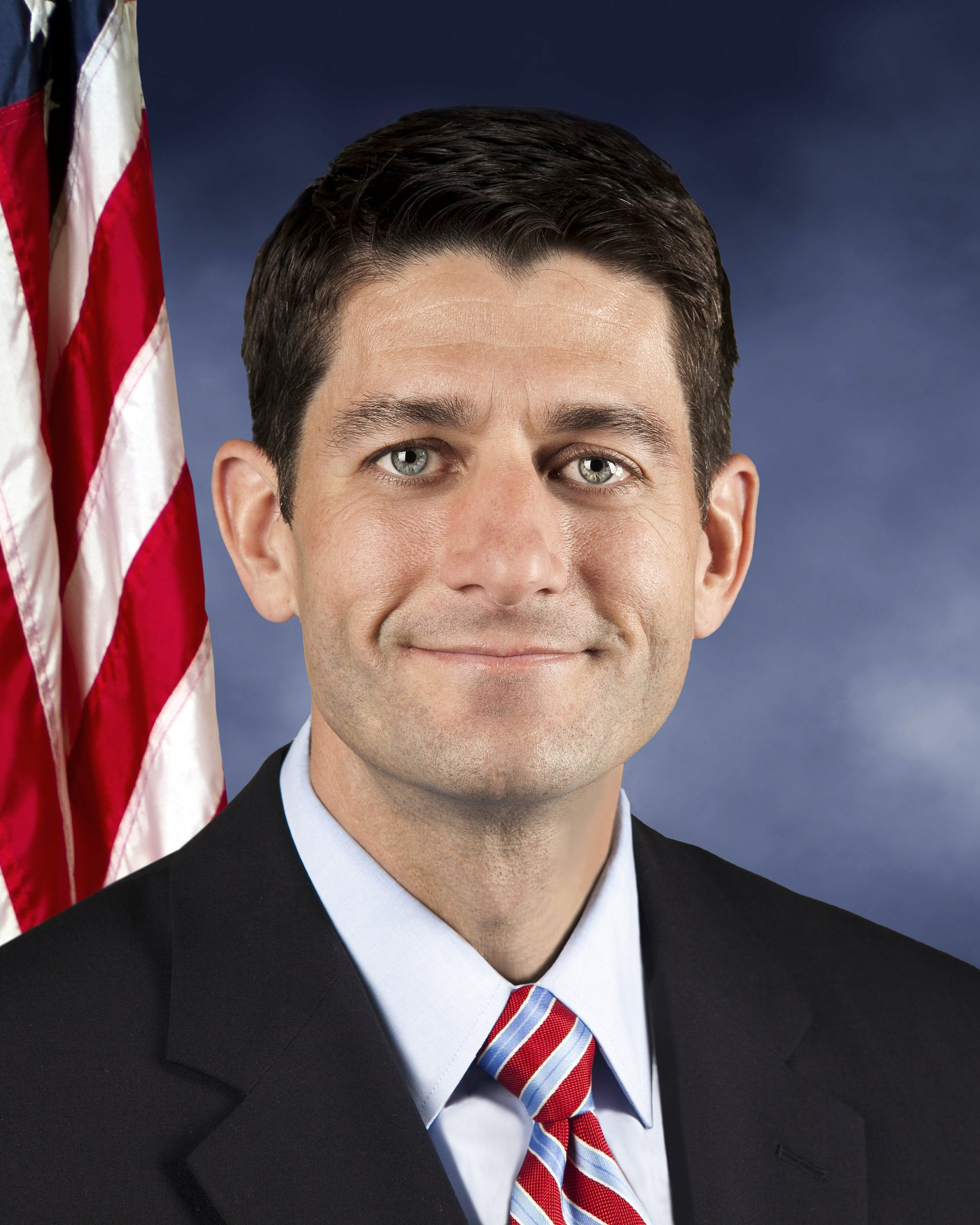
Representative
Paul Ryan
from Wisconsin
(1999–2019)

The list was later further narrowed down to five individuals: Christie, Pawlenty, Portman, Rubio, and Ryan. According to Double Down, many on Romney's campaign favored Ryan because he was "young, telegenic, Irish Catholic, with blue collar appeal," and could potentially help the campaign in his competitive home state. Romney also personally liked Ryan and felt comfortable campaigning with him. Christie was also strongly considered, but the vetting process raised several issues.

== The announcement ==
Having returned from his overseas tour of the United Kingdom, Israel, and Poland, Romney planned a bus tour of Virginia, North Carolina, and Florida with his then-yet to be announced running mate. It was possible that Romney could have chosen to stall his announcement until at least August 12, the last day of the Summer Olympics, in order to attract greater media and voter attention while still allowing time for campaigning and fundraising before the Republican National Convention, which would begin on August 27.

On August 10, 2012, it was announced that Romney would introduce his running mate on August 11, 2012, in Norfolk, Virginia, after touring the USS Wisconsin, leading several news sources to speculate that his choice would be U.S. Representative Paul Ryan of Wisconsin. Shortly after 7 a.m. on August 11, the Romney campaign officially announced Ryan as its choice for vice president through its mobile app titled "Mitt's VP".

== Media speculation on possible vice presidential candidates ==
Political analyst Larry Sabato stated that Romney could pick a vice presidential running mate that would help electorally such as by delivering a swing state or a demographic group. Romney's associates suggested the VP pick was likely to be someone mild-mannered with high integrity and have a similar aptitude for analysis. Media speculation and analysis on vice presidential picks included:

=== Members of Congress ===
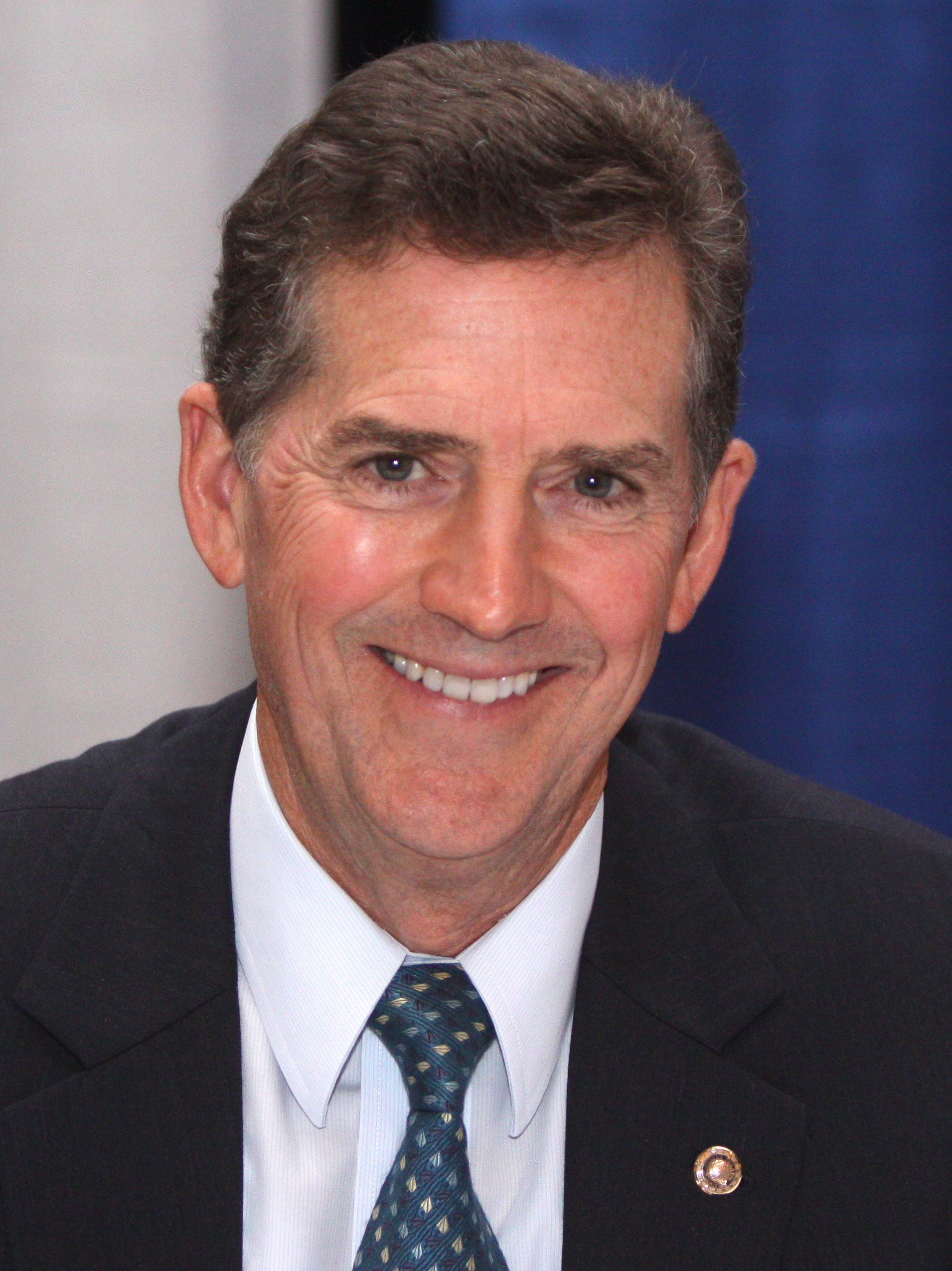
Senator
Jim DeMint
from South Carolina
(2005–2013)

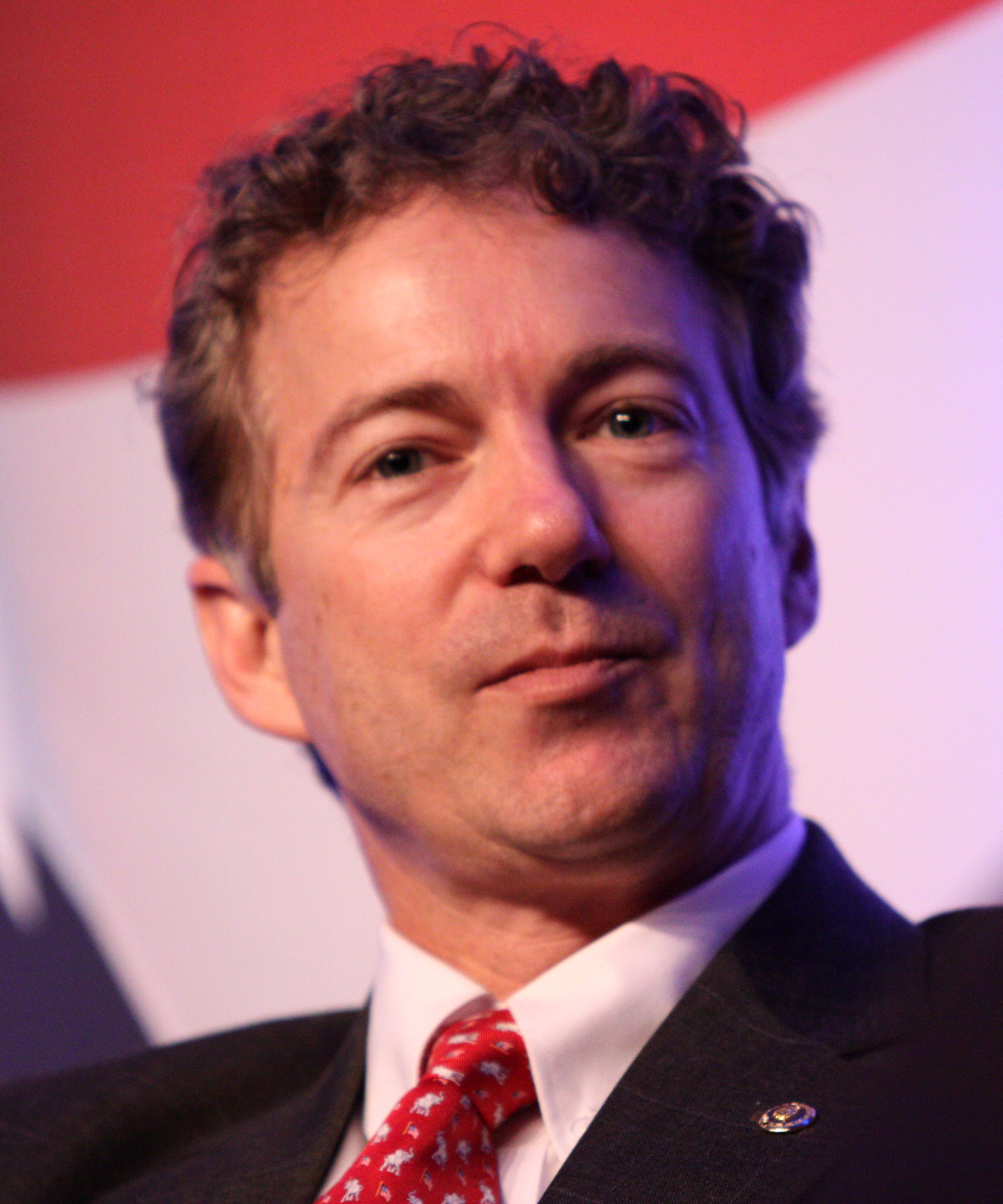
Senator
Rand Paul
from Kentucky
(2011–present)

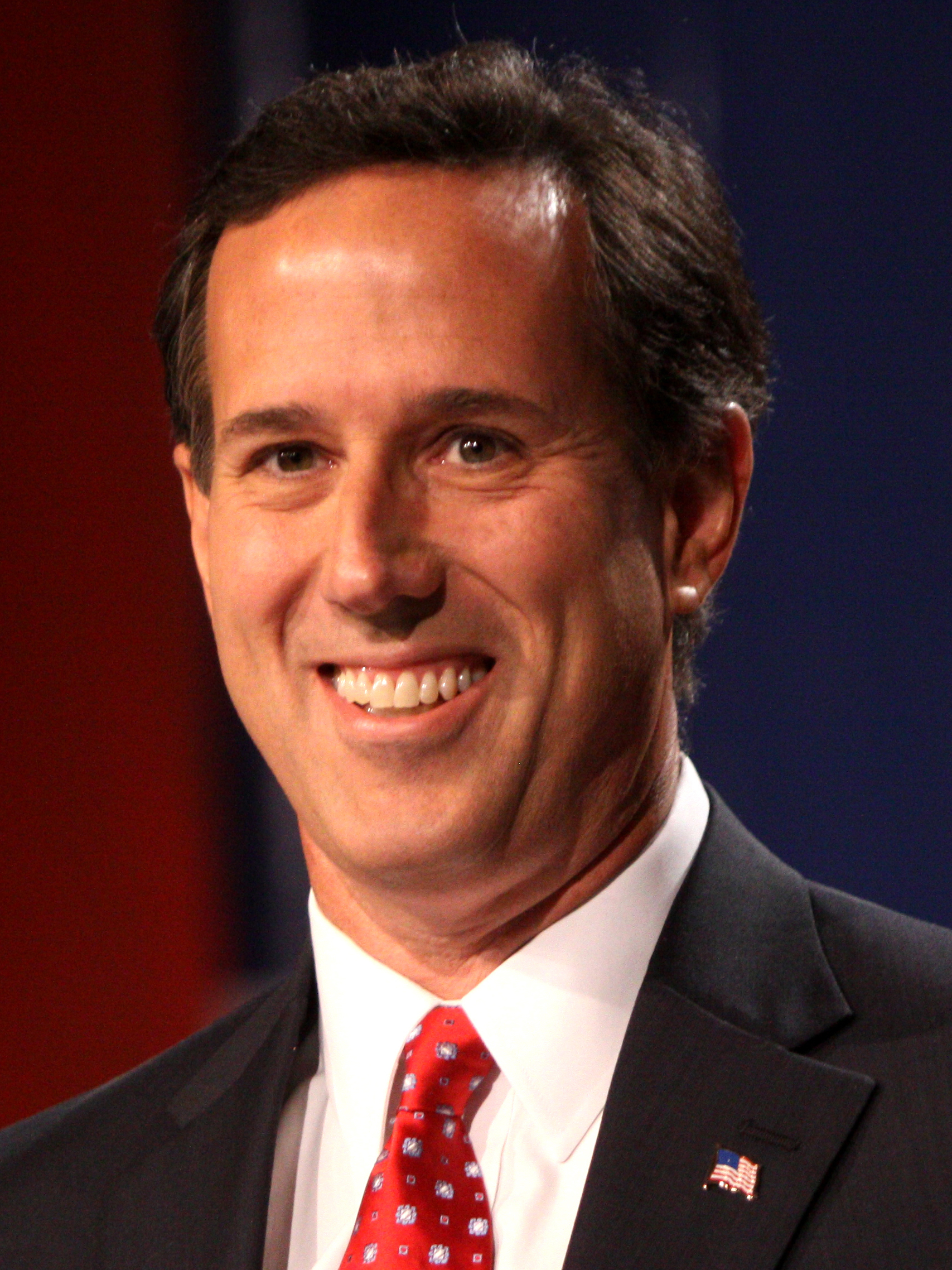
Former Senator
Rick Santorum
from Pennsylvania
(1995–2007)

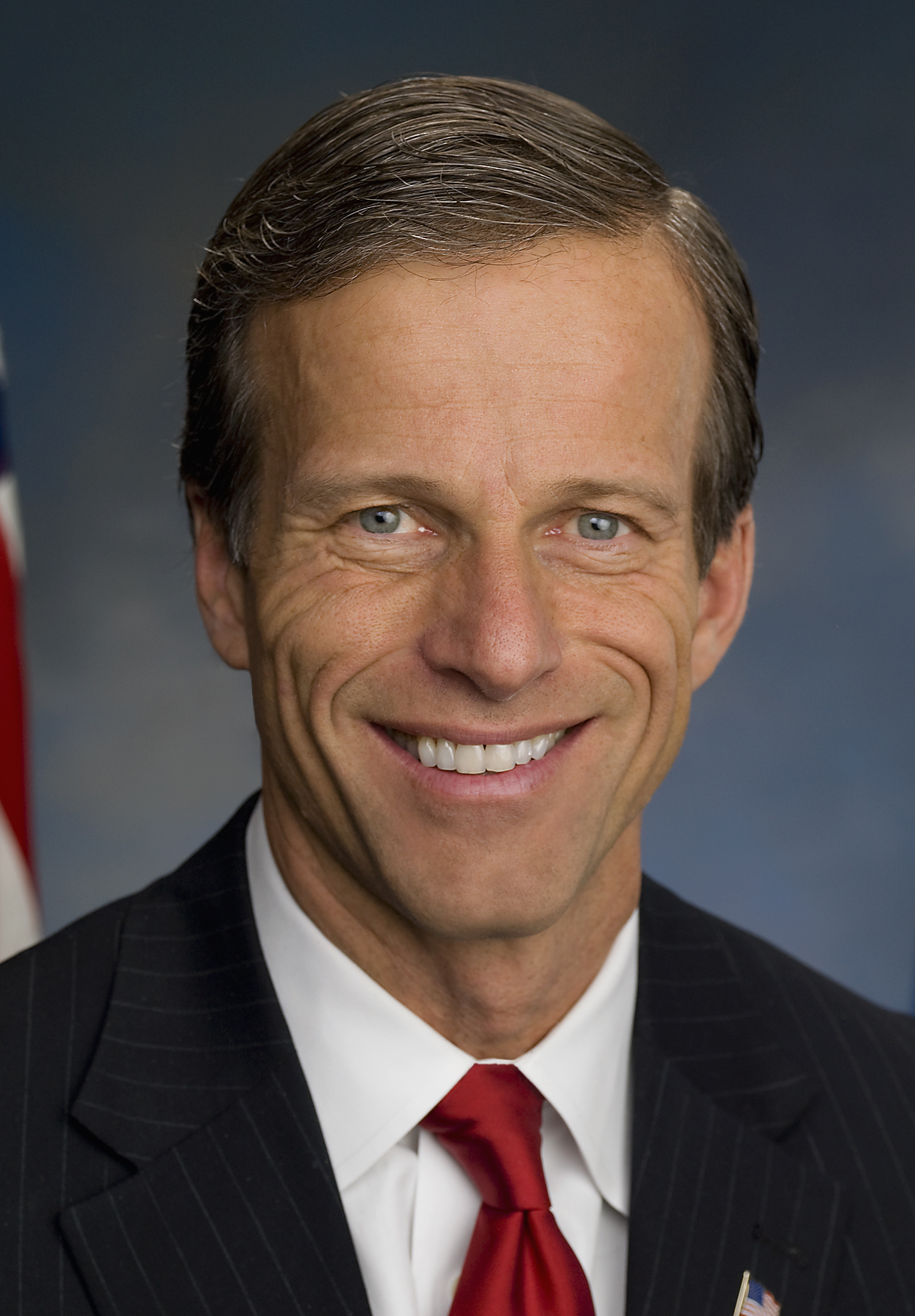
Senator
John Thune
from South Dakota
(2005–present)

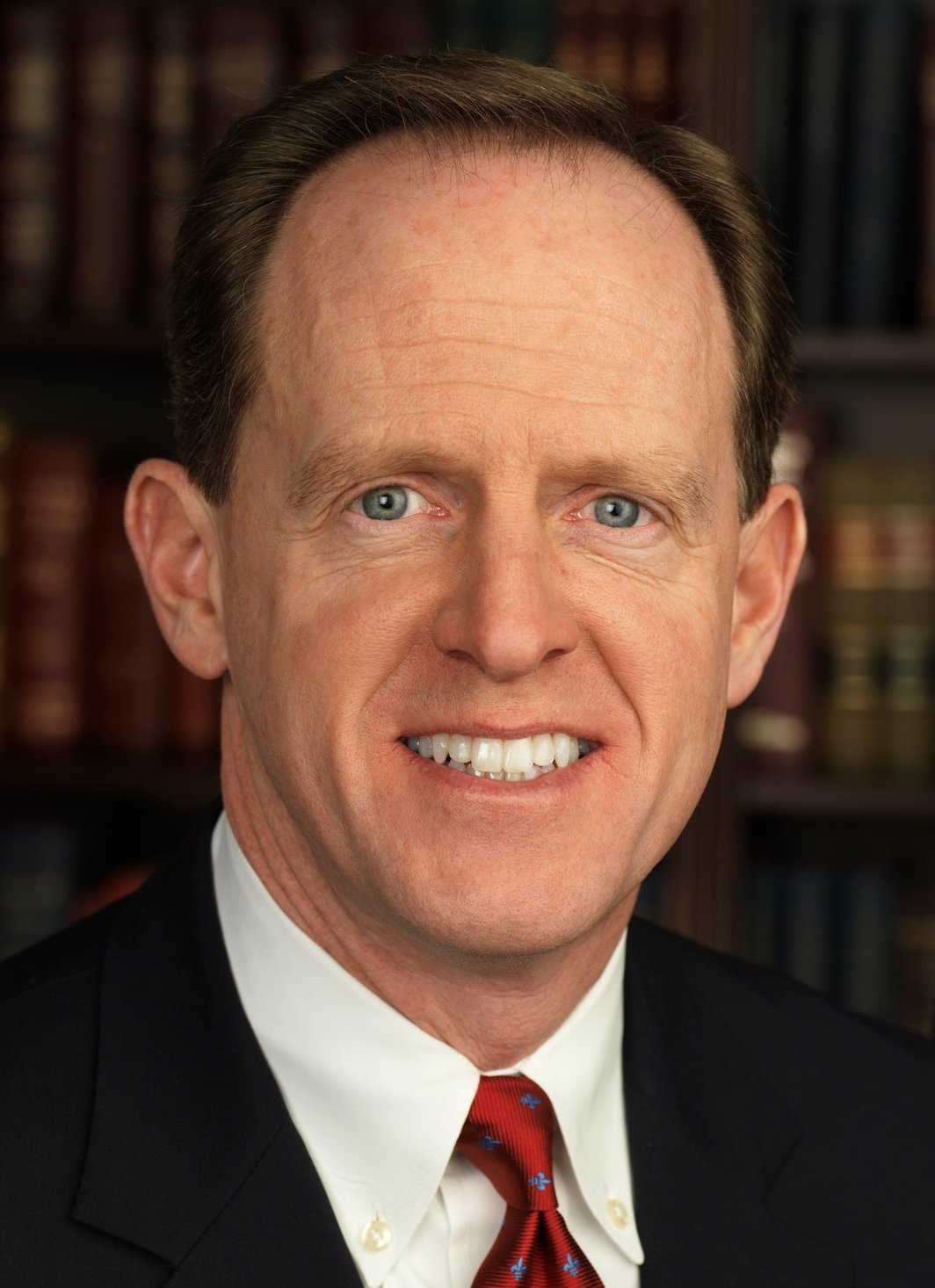
Senator
Pat Toomey
from Pennsylvania
(2011–2023)

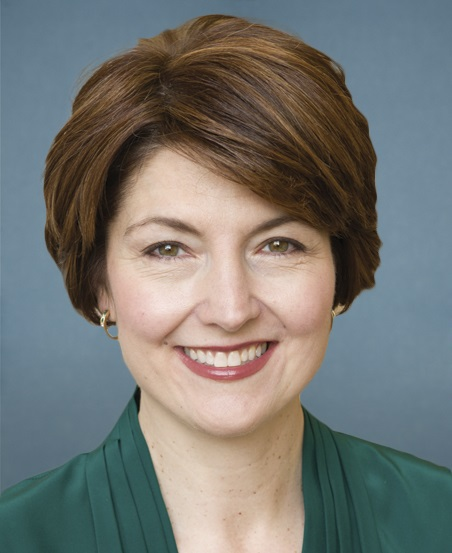
Representative
Cathy McMorris Rodgers
from Washington
(2005–2025)

=== Governors ===
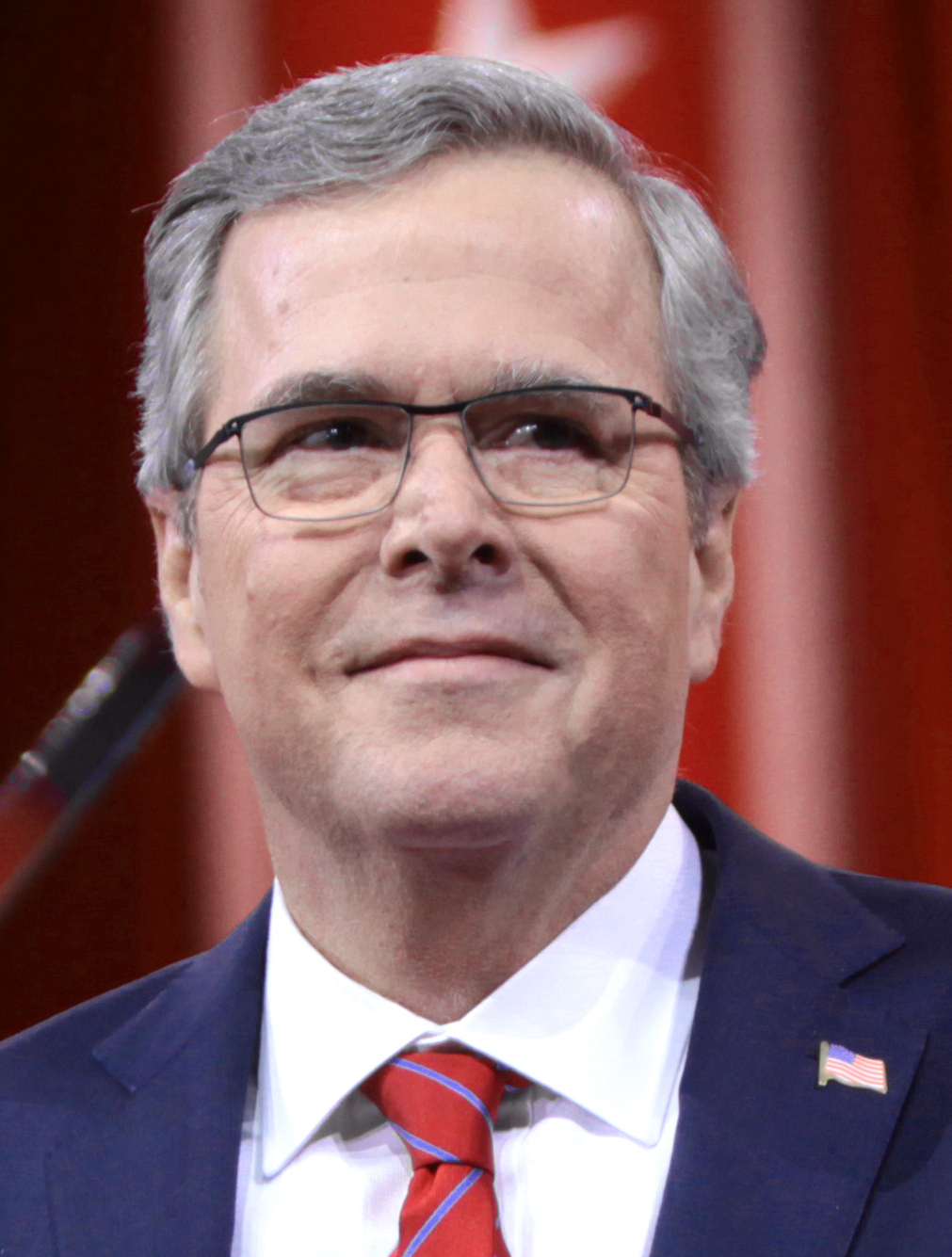
Jeb Bush
of Florida
(1999–2007)

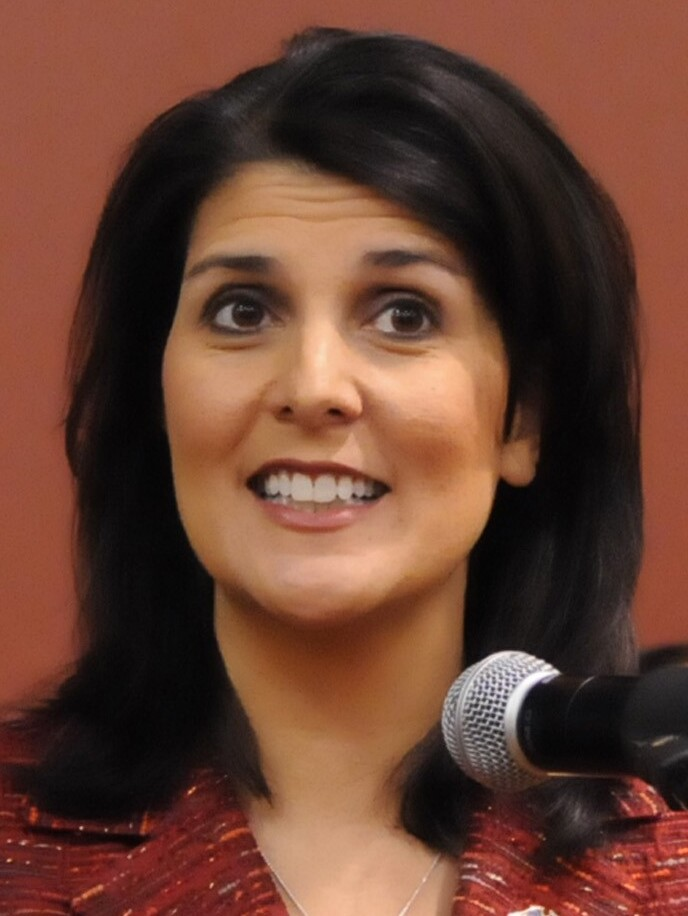
Nikki Haley
of South Carolina
(2011–2017)

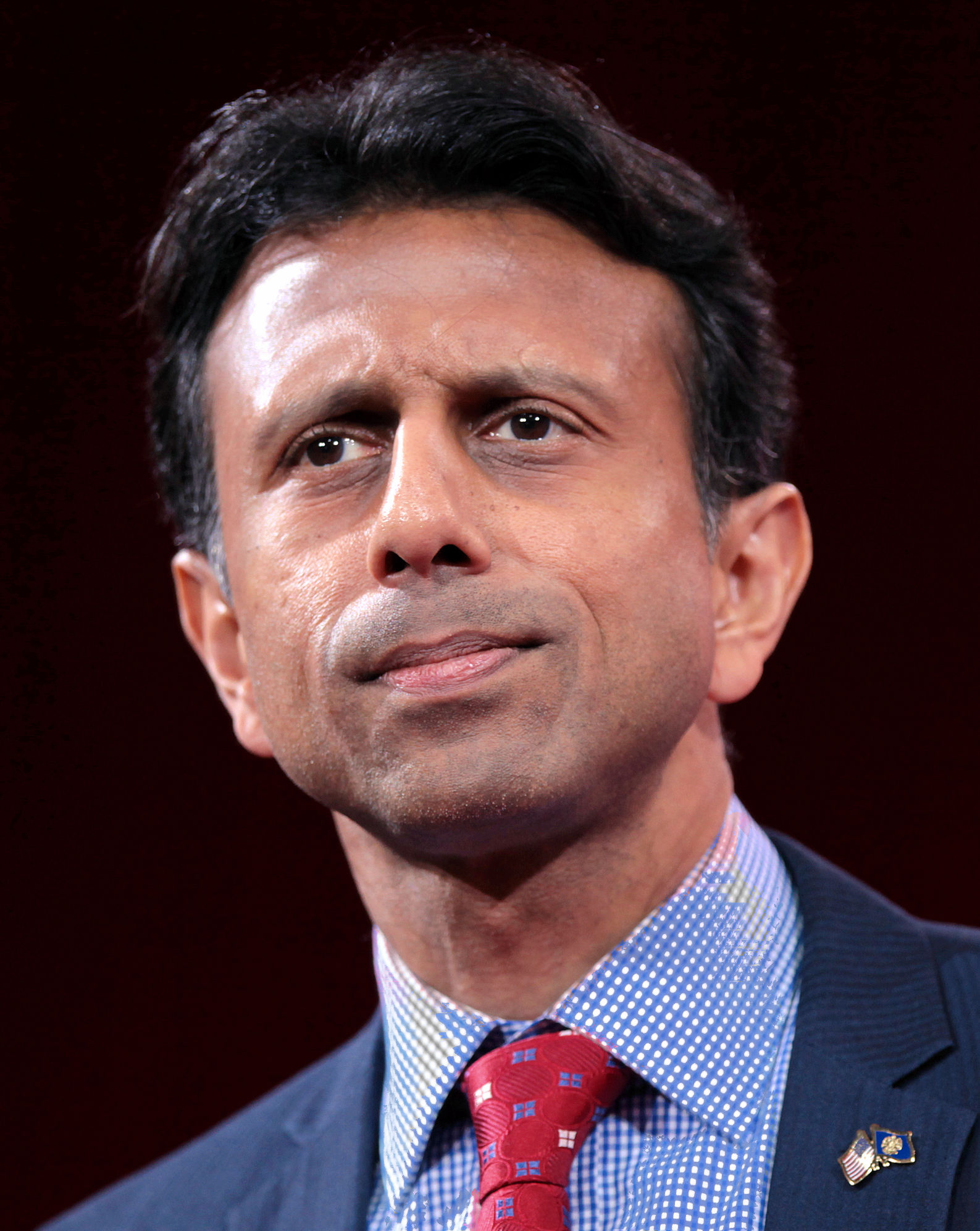
Bobby Jindal
of Louisiana
(2008–2016)

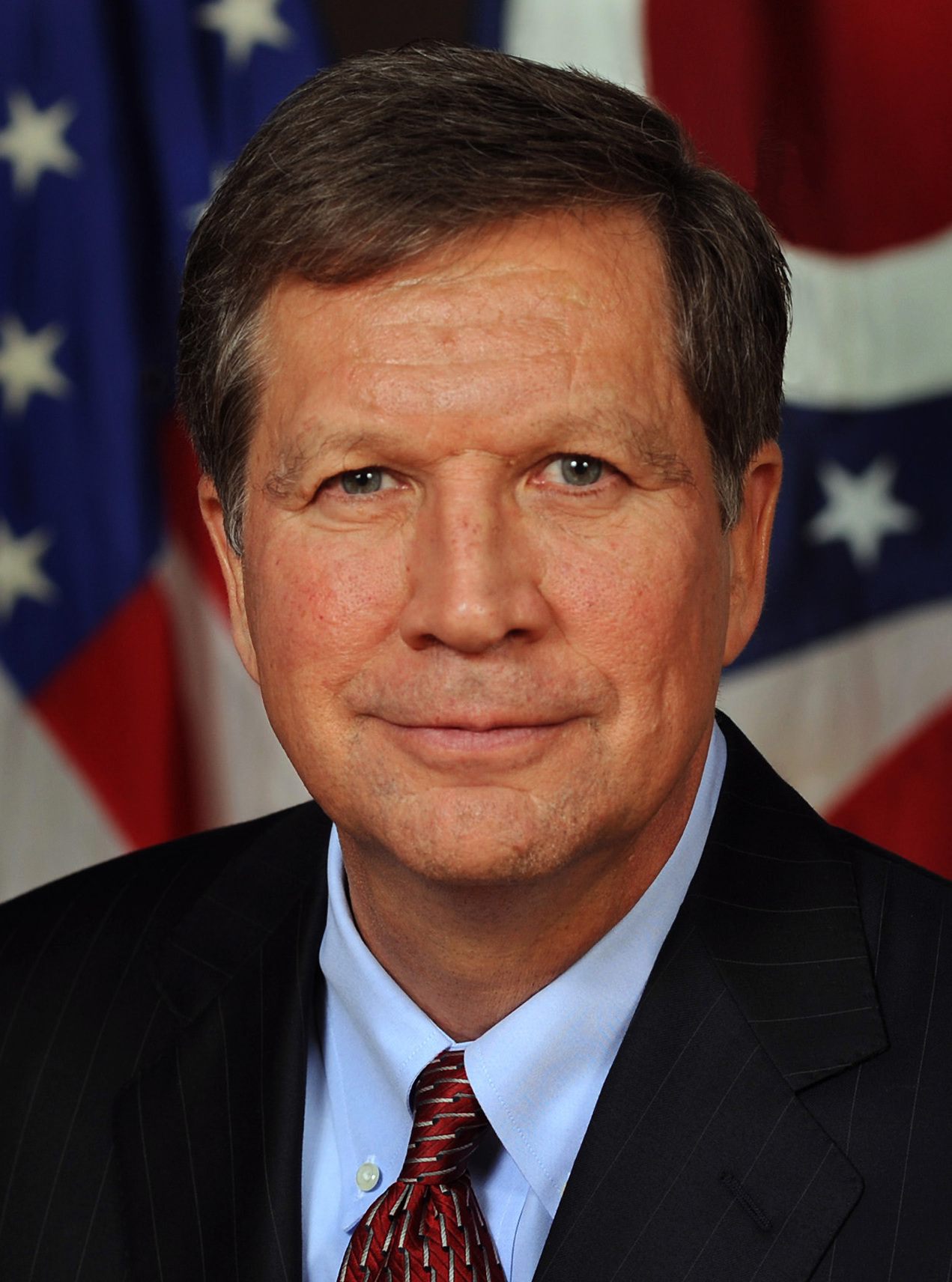
John Kasich
of Ohio
(2011–2019)

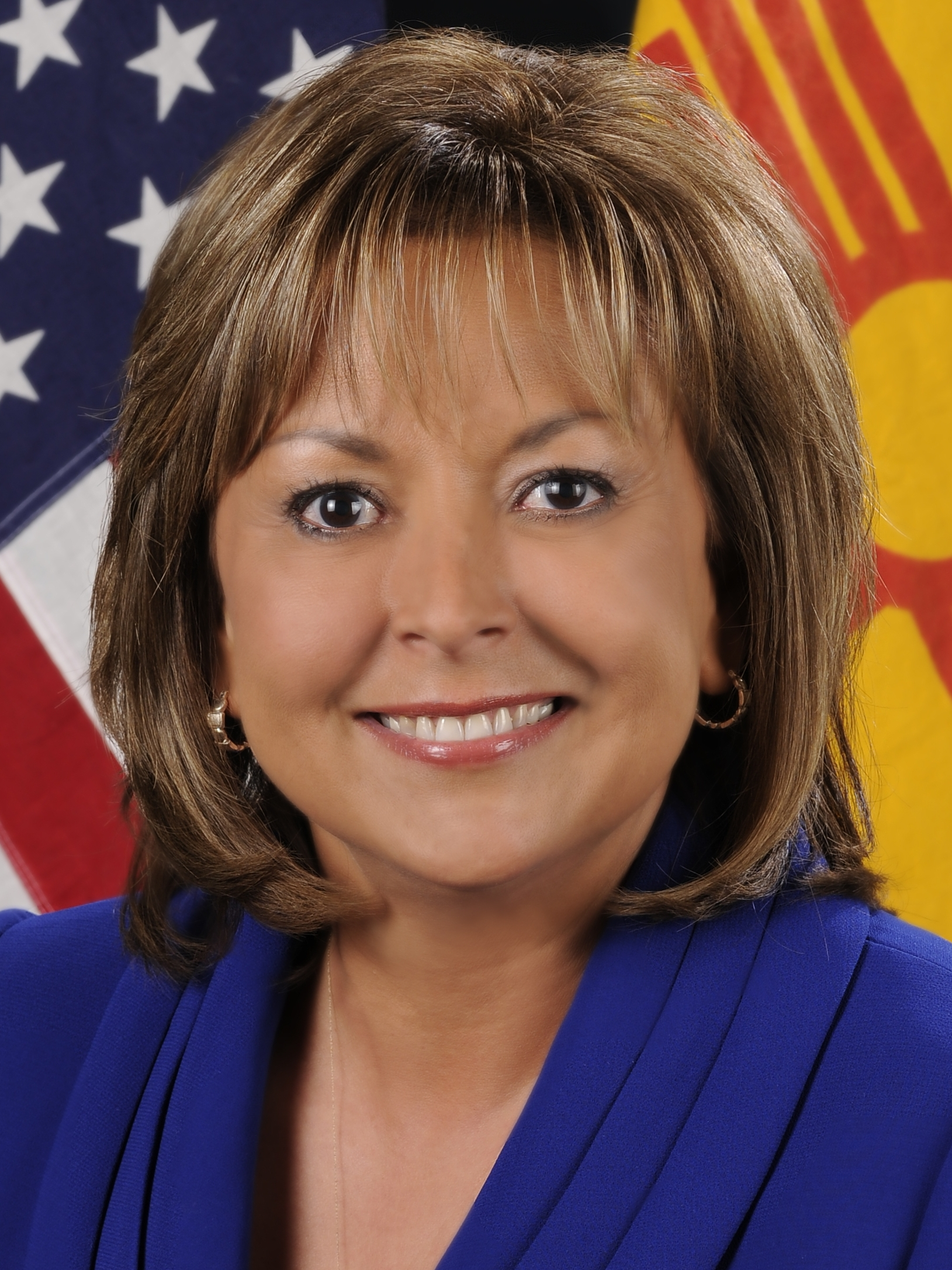
Susana Martinez
of New Mexico
(2011–2019)

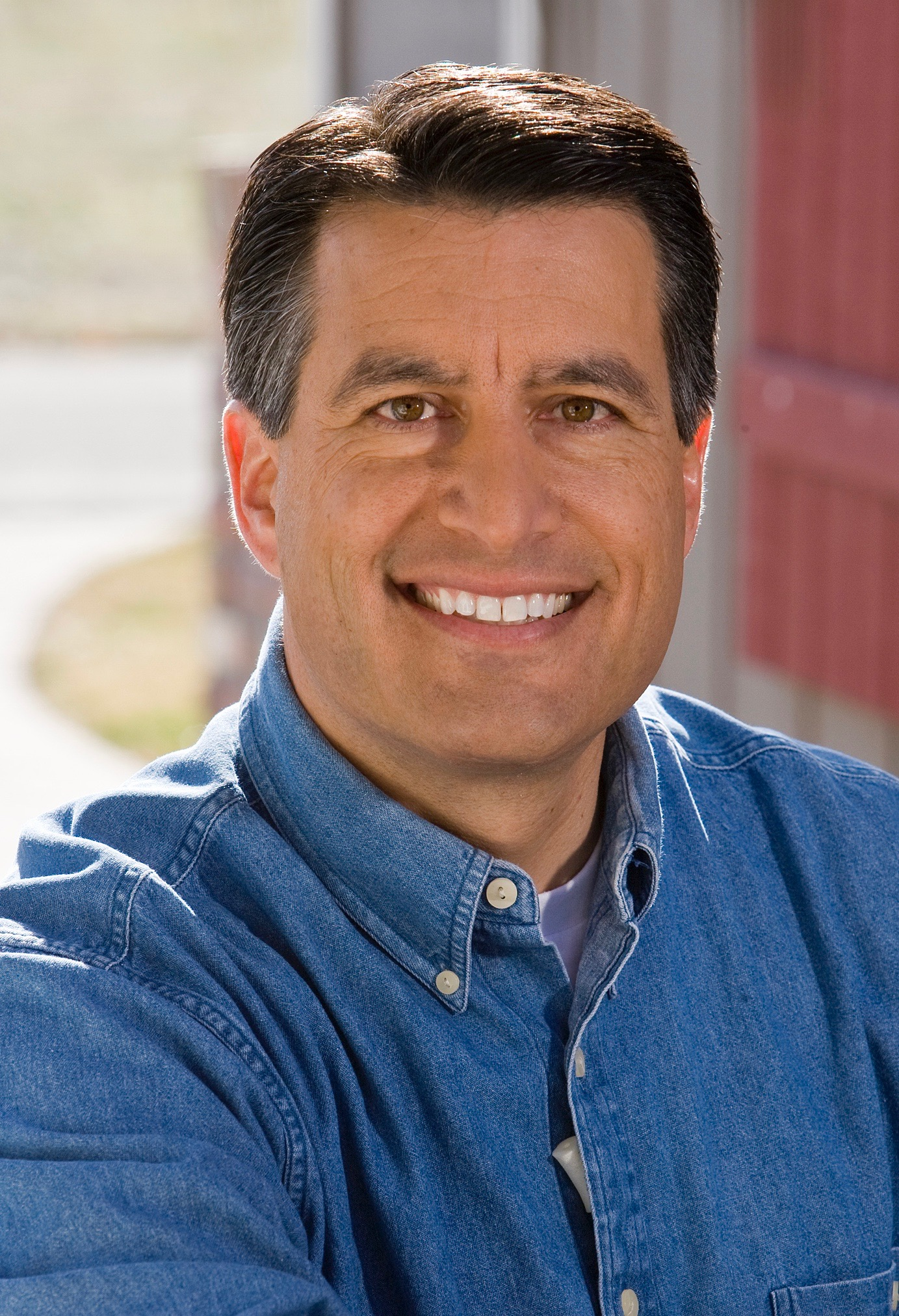
Brian Sandoval
of Nevada
(2011–2019)

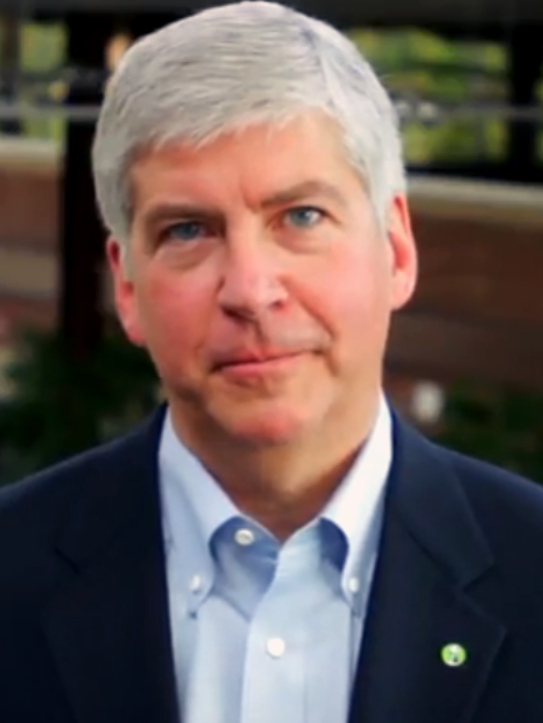
Rick Snyder
of Michigan
(2011–2019)

=== Others ===
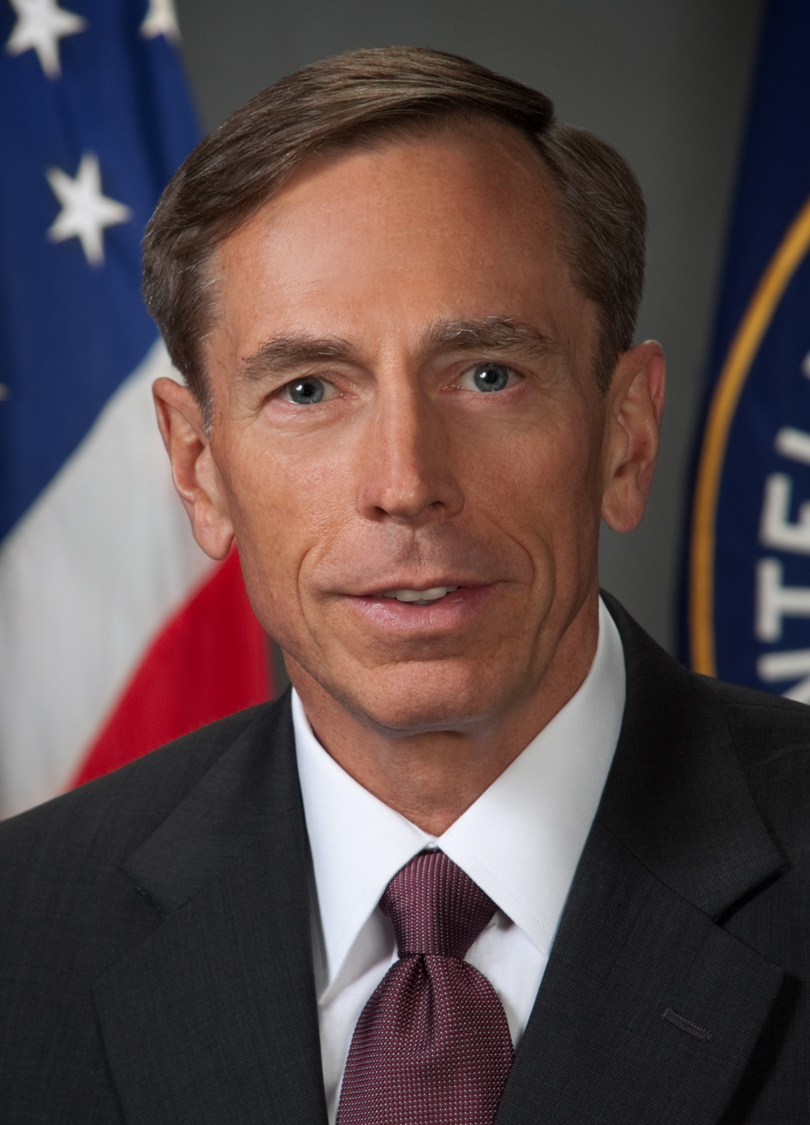
CIA Director
David Petraeus
from New York
(2011–2012)

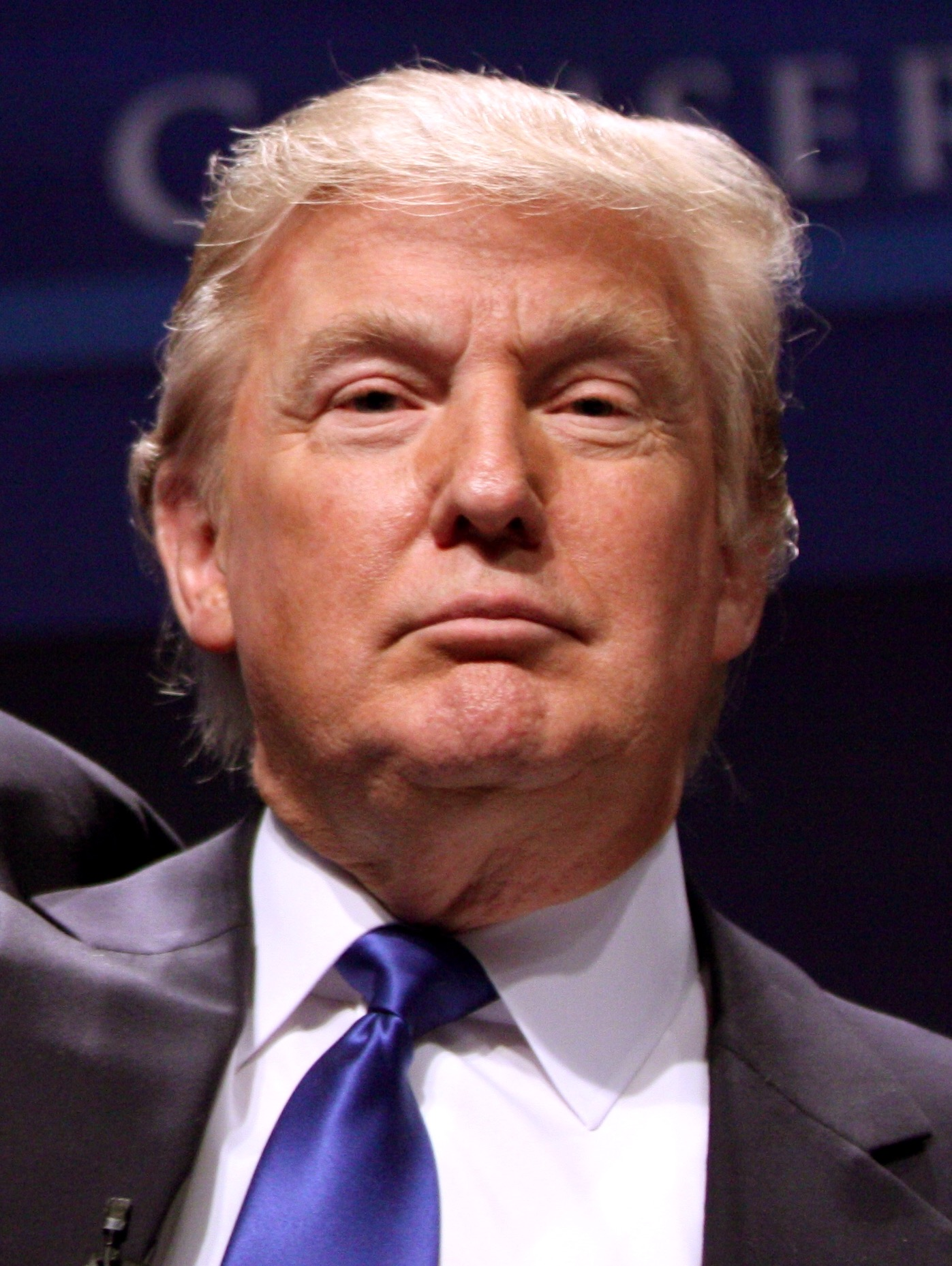
Businessman
Donald Trump
from New York

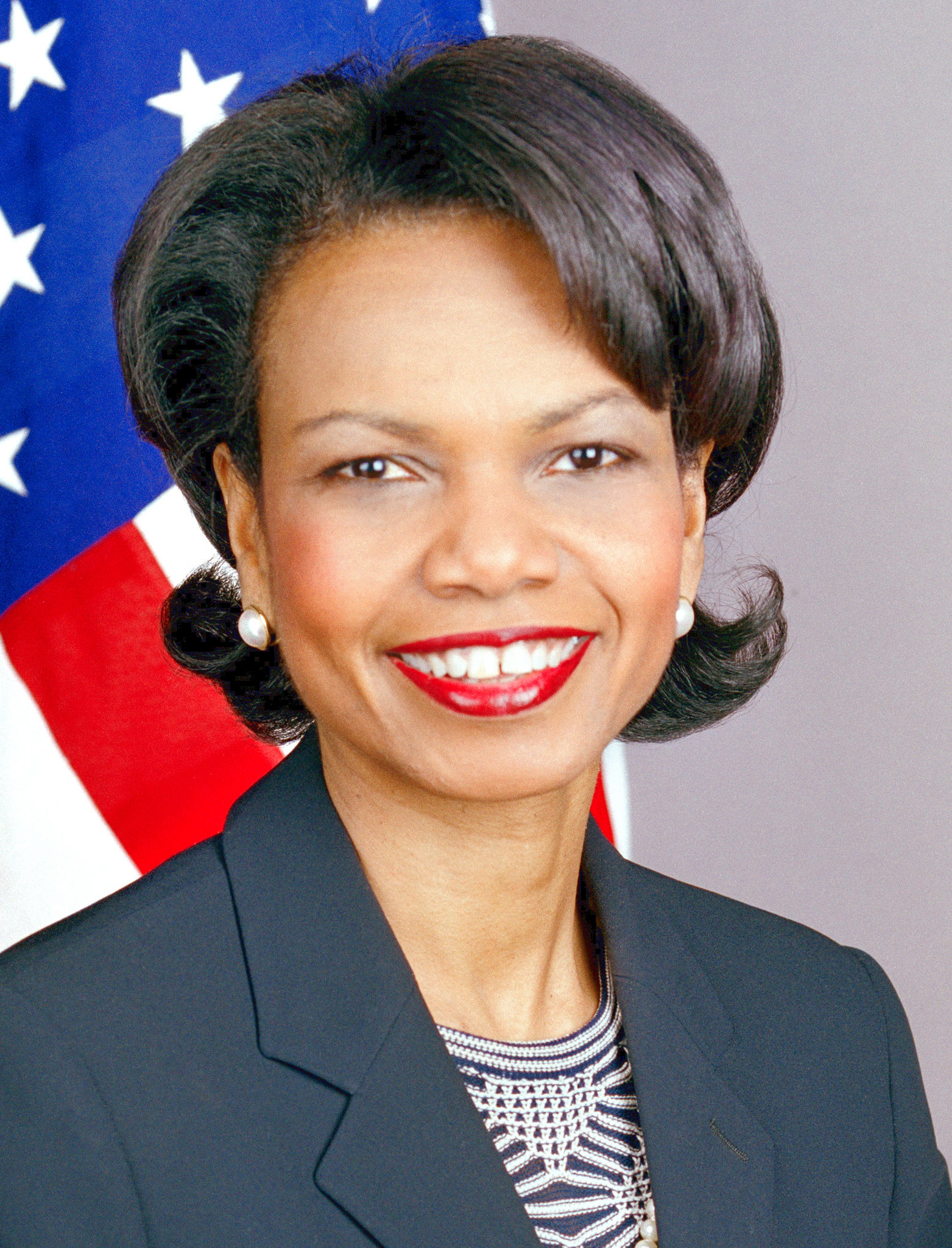
Former Secretary of State
Condoleezza Rice
from Alabama
(2005–2009)

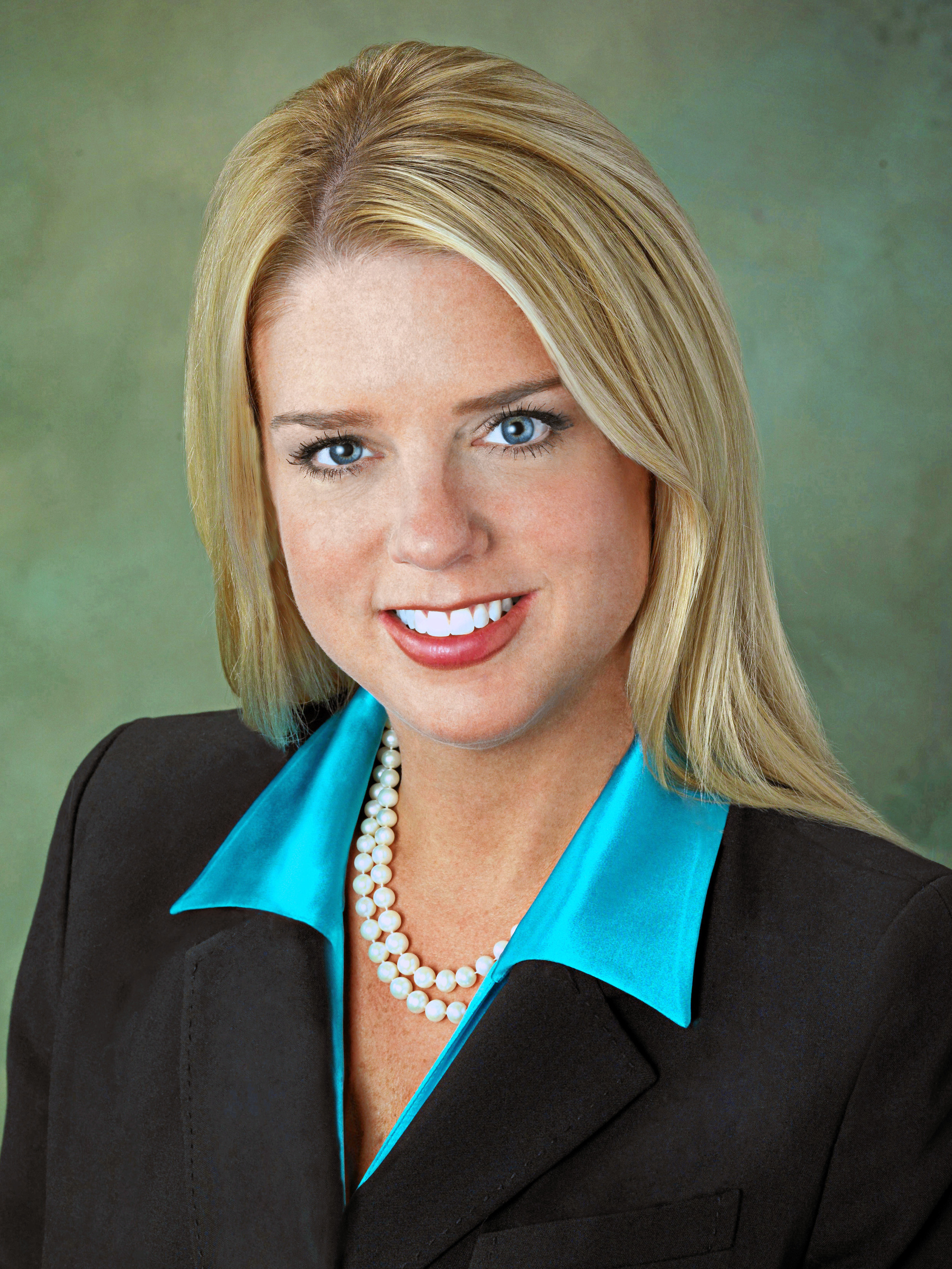
Attorney General
Pam Bondi
of Florida
(2011–2019)

== See also ==
- Mitt Romney 2012 presidential campaign
- 2012 Republican Party presidential candidates
- 2012 Republican Party presidential primaries
- 2012 Republican National Convention
- 2012 United States presidential election
- List of United States major party presidential tickets
