= Judith Levy =

Judith Levy may refer to:

- Judith Levy (philanthropist) (1706–1803), English philanthropist and socialite
- Anne Levy (politician) (Judith Anne Levy, born 1934), Australian politician
- Judith E. Levy (born 1958), American judge
