= 2008 in Michigan =

- Decades: 1980s; 1990s; 2000s; 2010s; 2020s
- See also: History of Michigan; Historical outline of Michigan; List of years in Michigan; 2008 in the United States

This article reviews key circumstances during 2008 in Michigan, including the state's office holders, performance of sports teams, cultural events, a chronology of the state's top news and sports stories, and Michigan-related deaths.

== Top stories ==
The top news stories in Michigan during 2008 included:

- Auto bailout. As a result of the 2008 financial crisis, the Great Recession, and substantial increases in the price of gasoline, Detroit's Big Three automakers saw substantial declines in their sales, particularly of sports utility vehicles and pickup trucks. In September 2008, the Big Three asked for $50 billion to pay for health care expenses and avoid bankruptcy and ensuing layoffs, and Congress approved a $25 billion loan. By December, President Bush agreed to an emergency bailout of $17.4 billion to be distributed by the next administration in January and February.
- Kwame Kilpatrick. On September 4, following months of controversy, Detroit mayor Kwame Kilpatrick announced his resignation as mayor, effective September 18, and pleaded guilty to two felony counts of obstruction of justice. In a separate assault case, he pleaded no contest to one felony count of assaulting and obstructing a police officer in exchange for a second assault charge being dropped. The plea deal also required his resignation as mayor. Kilpatrick was sentenced on October 28, 2008, to 120 days in jail. Detroit City Council President Kenneth Cockrel, Jr. replaced Kilpatrick as mayor on September 19.
- Democratic election victories. Democratic candidates achieved significant victories in the November 6 elections, including Barack Obama receiving 57% of the votes in the presidential election; Carl Levin's reelection to the U.S. Senate with 62.66% of the votes; Democratic candidates, Gary Peters and Mark Schauer, flipping U.S. House seats previously held by Republicans; and Democrats flipping 10 seats in the Michigan House of Representatives election.
- 2008 Michigan Proposal 1. Also on November 6, Michigan voters approved a ballot initiative allowing the medical use of marijuana for seriously ill patients. The initiative passed by a margin of 3,006,820 votes (62.67%) to 1,790,889 (37.33%).
- Film industry in Michigan. The Michigan Film and Digital Media Incentive was signed into law on April 7, 2008, by Governor Jennifer M. Granholm. The program offered nationally competitive film incentives that coincided with the automotive industry crisis. Projects drawn to Michigan included Gran Torino (2008), Motor City Motors (2009), Hung (2009-2011), Conviction (2010), and Kill the Irishman (2011).

Key sports stories included:

- The Detroit Red Wings compiled a 54–21–7 record and won the Stanley Cup as NHL champion for the fourth time in eleven years.
- The Detroit Lions went 0–16, the first team in NFL history to reach 16 losses in a season.
- The Detroit Pistons compiled a 59–23 record and lost to the Boston Celtics in the Eastern Conference finals.
- The Detroit Shock won the WNBA Finals.
- The 2008 PGA Championship was held at Oakland Hills in Bloomfield Hills. Pádraig Harrington won the championship.

Notable Michigan related deaths included former UAW president Douglas Fraser, Nobel Prize winner Thomas Huckle Weller, and Four Tops vocalist Levi Stubbs.

== Office holders ==
=== State office holders ===
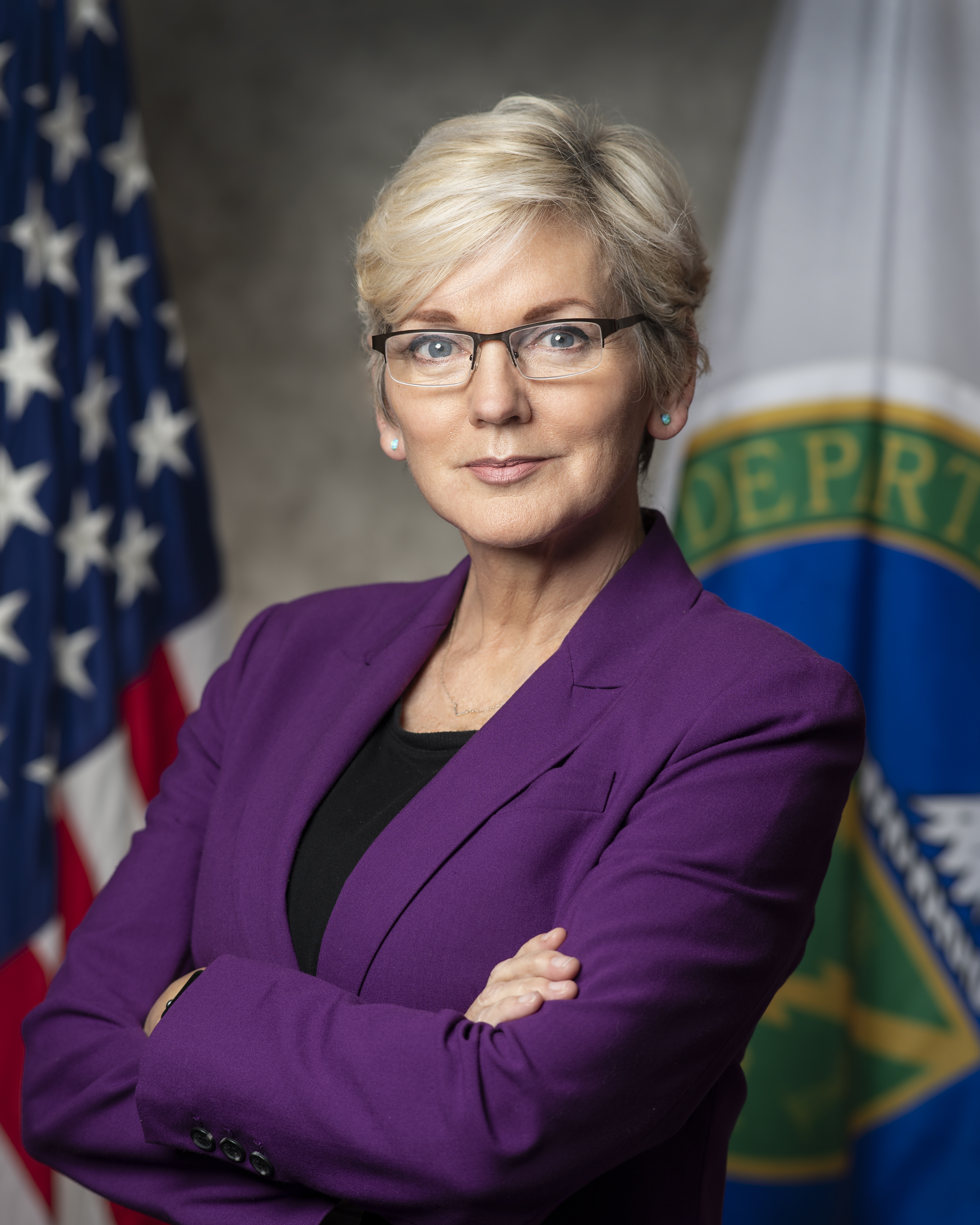
Jennifer Granholm

- Governor of Michigan - Jennifer Granholm (Democrat)
- Lieutenant Governor of Michigan: John D. Cherry (Democrat)
- Michigan Attorney General - Mike Cox (Republican)
- Michigan Secretary of State - Terri Lynn Land (Republican)
- Speaker of the Michigan House of Representatives: Andy Dillon (Democrat)
- Majority Leader of the Michigan Senate: Mike Bishop (Republican)
- Chief Justice, Michigan Supreme Court: Clifford Taylor

=== Federal office holders ===
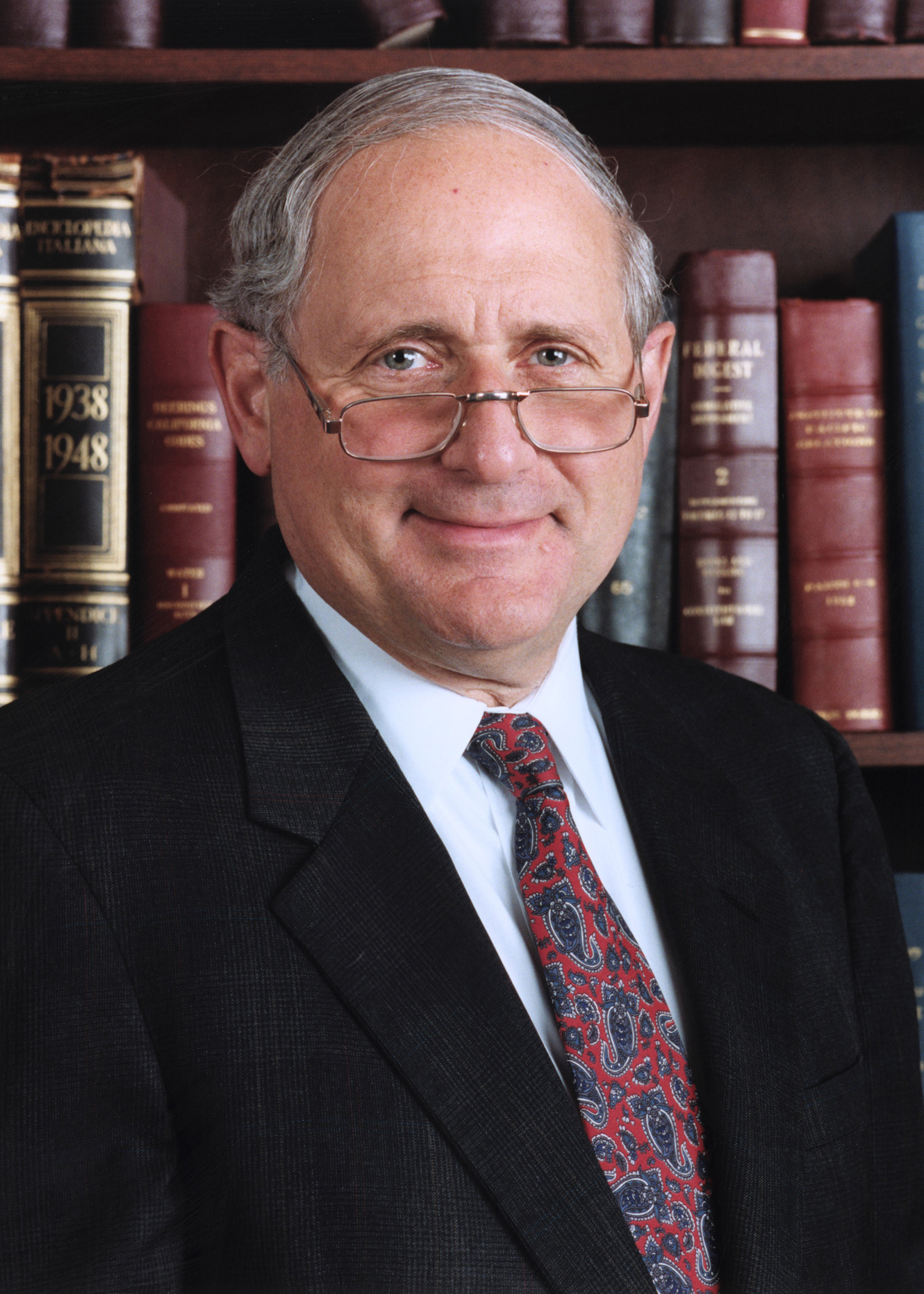
Carl Levin

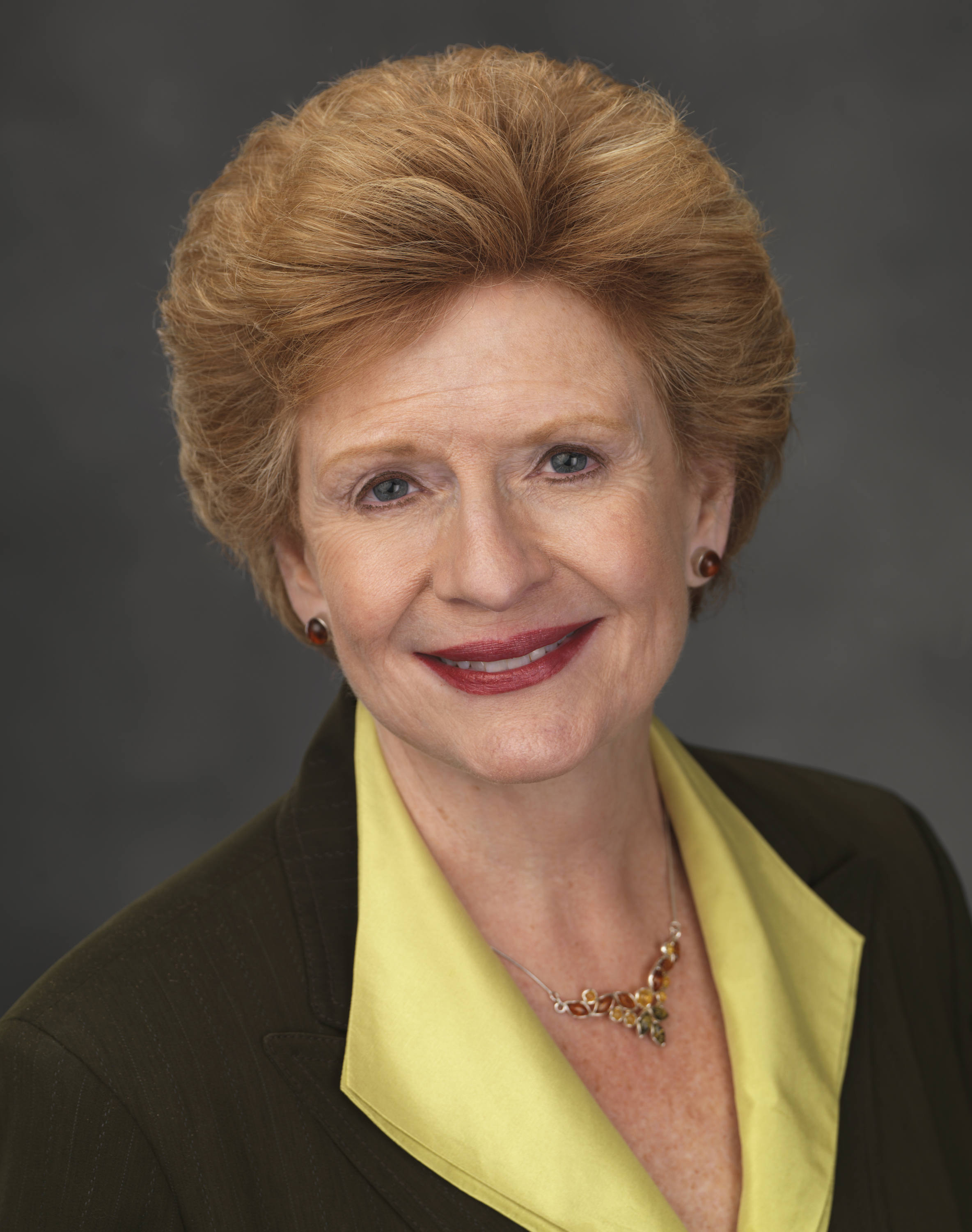
Debbie Stabenow

- U.S. Senator from Michigan - Carl Levin (Democrat)
- U.S. Senator from Michigan - Debbie Stabenow (Democrat)
- House District 1: Bart Stupak (Democrat)
- House District 2: Pete Hoekstra (Republican)
- House District 3: Vern Ehlers (Republican)
- House District 4: Dave Camp (Republican)
- House District 5: Dale Kildee (Democrat)
- House District 6: Fred Upton (Republican)
- House District 7: Tim Walberg (Republican)
- House District 8: Mike Rogers (Republican)
- House District 9: Joe Knollenberg (Republican)
- House District 10: Candice Miller (Republican)
- House District 11: Thaddeus McCotter (Republican)
- House District 12: Sander Levin (Democrat)
- House District 13: Carolyn Cheeks Kilpatrick (Democrat)
- House District 14: John Conyers (Democrat)
- House District 15: John Dingell (Democrat)

=== Mayors of major cities ===
- Mayor of Detroit: - Kwame Kilpatrick (Democrat)/Kenneth Cockrel, Jr. (Democrat)
- Mayor of Grand Rapids: - George Heartwell
- Mayor of Ann Arbor: John Hieftje (Democrat)
- Mayor of Lansing: Virgil Bernero
- Mayor of Flint: Don Williamson
- Mayor of Saginaw: Joyce J. Seals

== Sports ==
=== Baseball ===
- 2008 Detroit Tigers season - In their third year under manager Jim Leyland, the Tigers compiled a 74–88 record. Miguel Cabrera led the team with 37 home runs and 127 RBIs, while Magglio Ordóñez led in batting average at .317. Armando Galarraga led the pitching staff with a 13–7 record. Justin Verlander led the team with 161 strikeouts.

=== American football ===
- 2008 Detroit Lions season - In their third and final season under head coach Rod Marinelli, the Lions compiled a 0–16 record, the first team in NFL history to reach 16 losses in a season. General manager Matt Millen was fired in the fourth week of the season. The team's statistical leaders included quarterback Dan Orlovsky (1,616 passing yards), Kevin Smith (976 rushing yards), and Calvin Johnson (1,331 receiving yards).
- 2008 Michigan State Spartans football team - In their second season under head coach Mark Dantonio, the Spartans compiled a 9–4 record and lost to Georgia in the Capital One Bowl. The team's statistical leaders included Brian Hoyer (2,404 passing yards), Javon Ringer (1,637 rushing yards), and Mark Dell (679 receiving yards).
- 2008 Michigan Wolverines football team - In their first season under head coach Rich Rodriguez, the Wolverines compiled a 3–9 record and tied with Indiana for last place in the Big Ten. The team's statistical leaders included Steven Threet (1,105 passing yards), Brandon Minor (533 rushing yards), and Martavious Odoms (443 receiving yards).

=== Basketball ===
- 2007–08 Detroit Pistons season - Led by head coach Flip Saunders, the Pistons compiled a 59–23 record and lost to the Boston Celtics in the Eastern Conference finals. The team's statistical leaders included Chauncey Billups (1,324 points, 529 assists) and Antonio McDyess (666 rebounds).
- 2008 Detroit Shock season - Led by coach Bill Laimbeer, the Shock compiled a 22–12 and won the WNBA Finals. The team's statistical leaders included Deanna Nolan (538 points, 150 assists) and Cheryl Ford (208 rebounds).
- 2007–08 Michigan State Spartans men's basketball team - In their 13th season under head coach Tom Izzo, the Spartans compiled a 27–9 record. The team's statistical leaders included Raymar Morgan (505 points), Travis Walton (156 assists), and Goran Suton (295 rebounds).
- 2007–08 Michigan Wolverines men's basketball team - In their first season under head coach John Beilein, the Wolverines compiled a 10–22 record. The team's statistical leaders included Manny Harris (516 points), DeShawn Sims (173 rebounds), and Kelvin Grady (90 assists).

=== Ice hockey ===
- 2007–08 Detroit Red Wings season - In their third season under head coach Mike Babcock, the Red Wings compiled a 54–21–7 record and won the Stanley Cup as NHL champion for the fourth time in eleven years. The team's statistical leaders included Pavel Datsyuk (97 points, 66 assists) and Henrik Zetterberg (43 goals). Chris Osgood and Dominik Hašek each won 27 games.

=== Other ===
- 2008 PGA Championship
- 2008 3M Performance 400
- 2008 LifeLock 400

== Chronology of events ==
=== January ===
- January 28 - Kwame Kipatrick's chief of staff Christine Beatty resigned after the release of thousands of text messages showing she was having an affair with Kilpatrick.

=== March ===
- March 24 - Wayne County Prosecutor Kym Worthy announced an indictment against Kwame Kilpatrick and his former chief of staff, including charges of perjury, misconduct in office, and obstruction of justice.

=== May ===
- May 16 - The Detroit Free Press reported that 29 of Kwame Kilpatrick's closest friends and family had been put on the city payroll.

=== July ===
- July 3 - The first Rothbury Music Festival was held in Rothbury, Michigan. The festival war later renamed Electric Forest.
- July 24 - Kwame Kilpatrik assaulted a Wayne County sheriff's deputy who was trying to serve a subpoena at the home of Kipatrick's sister.
- July 25 - WXYZ TV reported that Kwame Kilpatrick and others used their positions to help an influential minister who had been arrested for soliciting a prostitute.

=== August ===
- August 7 - Kwame Kipatrick was jailed for a day after violating the terms of his bail by traveling to Windsor, Ontario, to meet with that city's mayor.

=== September ===
- September 4 - Kwame Kilpatrick announced his resignation as mayor and pleaded guilty to two counts of obstruction of justice and no contest to assaulting a deputy.
- September 19 - Detroit City Council President Kenneth Cockrel, Jr. replaced Kilpatrick as mayor at 12:01 a.m.

=== November ===
- November 8: election day in Michigan

- 2008 United States presidential election in Michigan: Barack Obama received 57% of the votes, defeating John McCain.
- 2008 United States Senate election in Michigan: Carl Levin was reelected to the U.S. Senate with 62.66% of the votes
- 2008 United States House of Representatives elections in Michigan: Democratic candidates, Gary Peters and Mark Schauer, flipped U.S. House seats previously held by Republicans
- 2008 Michigan House of Representatives election: Democrats flipped 10 seats in the Michigan House of Representatives.
- 2008 Michigan Proposal 1. Michigan voters approved a ballot initiative allowing the medical use of marijuana for seriously ill patients. The initiative passed by a margin of 3,006,820 votes (62.67%) to 1,790,889 (37.33%).
- 2008 Michigan Proposal 2: A proposal to amend the Michigan Constitution to remove restrictions on stem cell research while maintaining the ban on human cloning. It passed with 52.61% of the votes.

== Deaths ==
- January 17 - John McHale, Detroit Tigers player (1943–48) and baseball executive, at age 86
- February 8 - Paul Kromer, one of U-M's "Touchdown Twins" in 1938 with Tom Harmon, at age 90
- February 23 - Douglas Fraser, president of the UAW (1977–83), at age 91
- March 5 - John C. Mackie, US Congress (1965–67), at age 87
- March 22 - Robert J. McIntosh, attorney, pilot and politician, at age 85
- April 25 - Sonny Grandelius, Michigan State halfback (1950), head coach Colorado (1959–61), Detroit Wheels general manager (1974), at age 79
- April 25 - George Puscas, Detroit Free Press sports writer (1941–2000), at age 81
- May 24 - Dick Martin, comedian and director, native of Battle Creek, at age 86
- July 9 - Don Eaddy, three-sport athlete at Michigan (1951–53), at age 74
- July 22 - Vincent Mroz, Michigan and Michigan State football player, Secret Service agent stopped the 1950 attempted assassination of Harry S. Truman by Puerto Rican nationalists, at age 86
- August 23 - Thomas Huckle Weller, Nobel Prize winning urologist, at age 93
- September 19 - Ned Harkness, Detroit Red Wings head coach (1970–71), GM (1971–74), at age 89
- September 23 - Wally Hilgenberg, Detroit Lions (1964–67), at age 66
- September 30 - Ed Brinkman, Detroit shortstop (1971–74), at age 66
- October 15 - Tom Tresh, baseball player from Detroit (1961–69), at age 70
- October 17 - Levi Stubbs, lead vocalist of the Four Tops, at age 72
- October 31 - Leroy Bolden, Michigan State halfback (1952–53), at age 76
- November 26 - Julius Franks, the first African-American All-American at U-M, at age 86
- November 30 - Pit Martin, Detroit Red Wings center (1961–66), at age 64
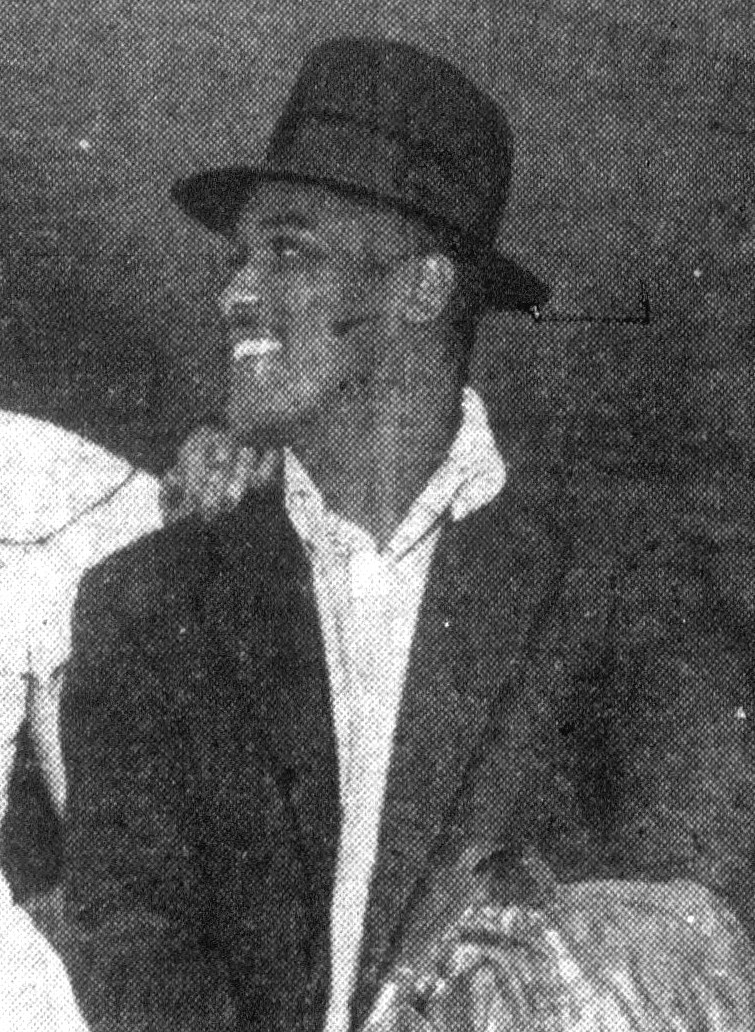
Leroy Bolden

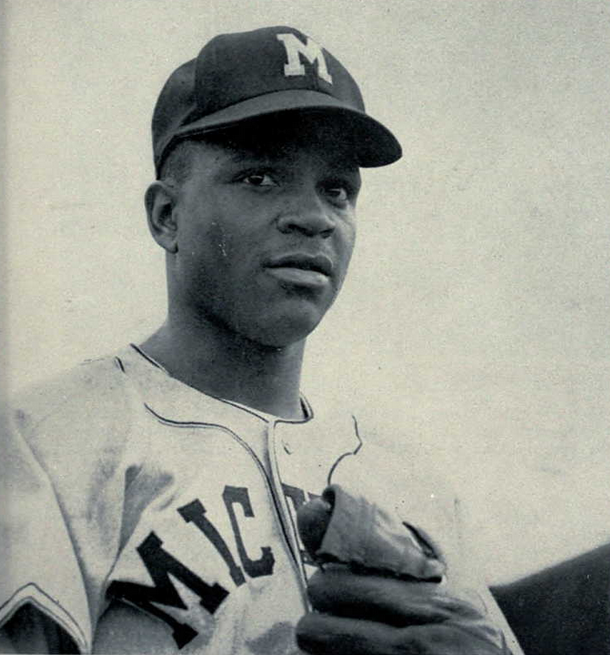
Don Eaddy

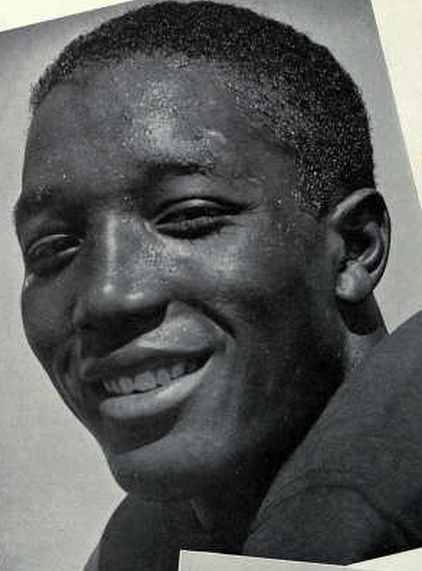
Julius Franks

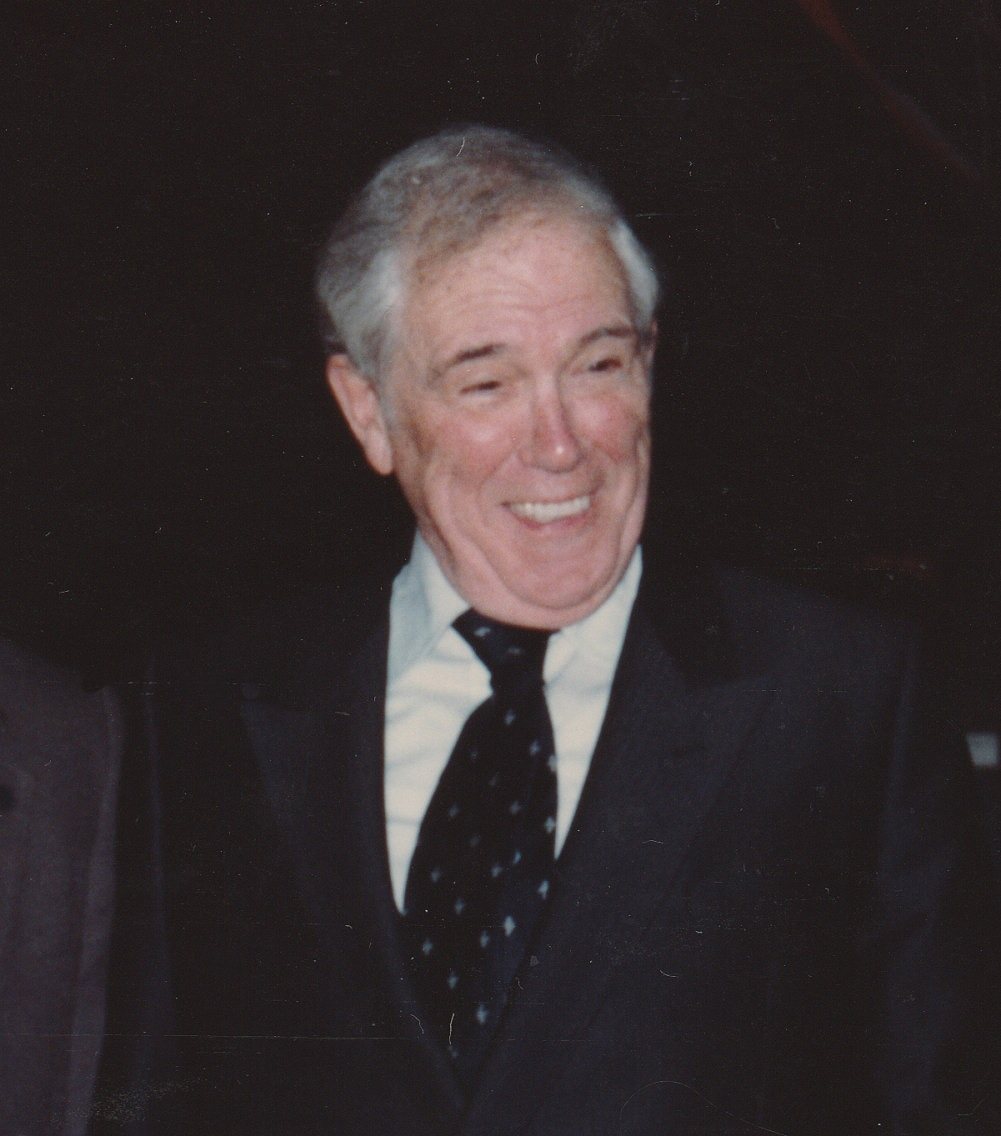
Douglas Fraser

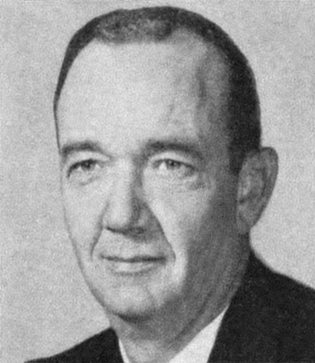
John C. Mackie

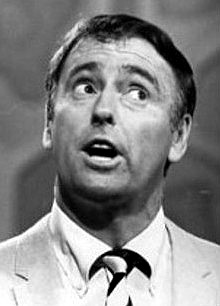
Dick Martin

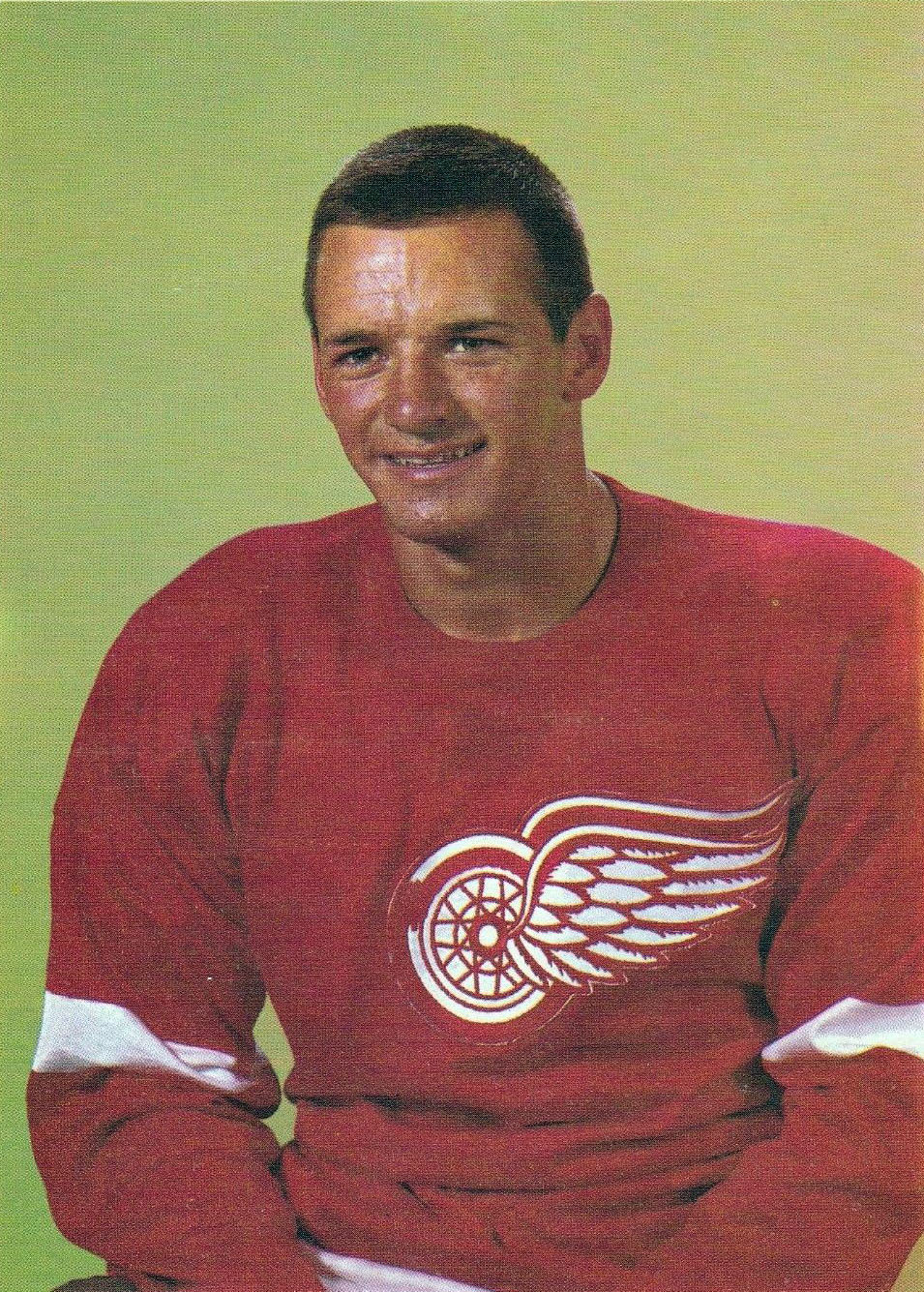
Pit Martin

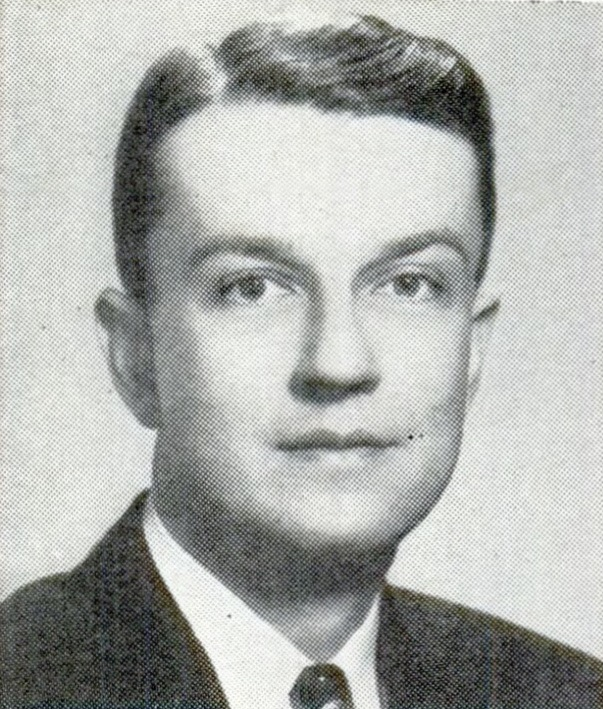
Robert J. McIntosh

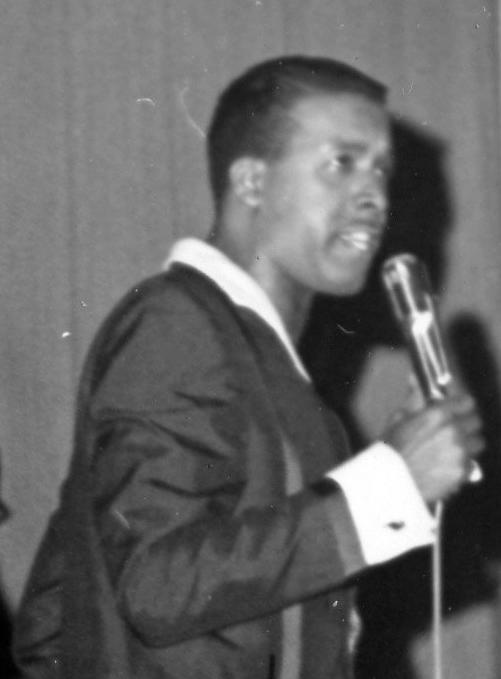
Levi Stubbs

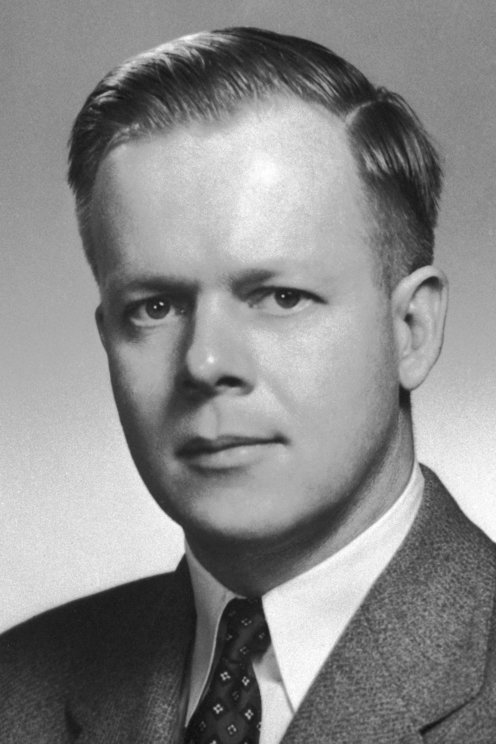
Thomas Huckle Weller

== See also ==
- 2008 in the United States
