= Proposal =

Proposal(s) or The Proposal may refer to:

- Proposal (business)
- Research proposal
- Marriage proposal
- Proposition, a proposal in logic and philosophy

== Arts, entertainment, and media ==
- The Proposal (album), an album by Ransom & Statik Selektah

=== Films ===
- The Proposal (1957 film), an Australian television play based on Chekhov's 1890 play
- The Proposal (2001 film), starring Nick Moran, Jennifer Esposito, and Stephen Lang
- The Proposal (2009 film), starring Sandra Bullock and Ryan Reynolds
- The Proposal (2022 film), starring Joe Joseph and Amara Raja
- "La propuesta" ("The Proposal"), a short story in the 2014 Argentina anthology film Wild Tales

=== Literature ===
- Proposals (play), a 1997 play by Neil Simon
- The Proposal (novel), 1999 and 35th book in the Animorphs series by K.A. Applegate
- The Proposal, alternative title of Chekhov's 1890 play A Marriage Proposal

=== Television ===
- The Proposal (American TV series), a 2018 reality dating series
- The Proposal (Australian TV series), based on the American series
- "The Proposal" (Angie), a 1979 episode
- "The Proposal", the title of three Dynasty episodes:
  - "The Proposal" (Dynasty 1983)
  - "The Proposal" (Dynasty 1985)
  - "The Proposal" (Dynasty 1988)
- "The Proposal" (Frasier), a 2002 episode
- "The Proposal" (The O.C.), a 2004 episode
- "Proposals" (The Two of Us), a 1986 episode

== See also ==
- Category:Lists of proposals
- Government proposal (disambiguation)
- Proposal 2 (disambiguation)
- Proposal Rock (disambiguation)
