= 2008 Michigan elections =

- November 4, 2008

The 2008 Michigan elections were held in the U.S. state of Michigan on November 4, 2008. The presidential primary was held on January 15. The state primary was held on August 5.

== Federal ==
=== Presidential primaries ===
The presidential primaries were held on January 15, 2008. Hillary Clinton won the Democratic primary in Michigan, but Barack Obama won the primary nationally. Mitt Romney won the Republican primary in Michigan, but John McCain won the primary nationally.

=== Presidential general election ===
Democratic nominee Barack Obama won the presidential general election in Michigan, defeating Republican nominee John McCain. All 17 of Michigan's electoral votes went to Obama. Obama would also win the presidency nationally.

=== U.S. Senate ===
Incumbent Democrat Carl Levin was re-elected to the U.S. Senate.

=== U.S. House of Representatives ===
Two incumbent Republicans were defeated, resulting in 8 Democratic members of the U.S. House and 7 Republicans.

== Legislature ==
=== State House of Representative ===
The Democrats win a greater lead in the state House, resulting in a 67–43 majority over the Republicans.

== Judiciary ==
=== Supreme Court ===
Incumbent Republican chief justice Clifford Taylor sought re-election on November 4, 2008. While Michigan State Supreme Court elections are officially nonpartisan, the candidates are permitted to be nominated at political party conventions. Taylor was defeated by Democratic nominee Diane Hathaway.

== Michigan State Board of Education and University boards ==
=== State Board of Education ===
Incumbent Democrats Kathleen Straus and John Austin were re-elected, preserving the 6–2 majority the party held on the board.

=== Michigan State University Board of Trustees ===
In the November 4, 2008, general election, incumbent Michigan State University trustee Scott Romney sought re-election, while incumbent Democrat Dorothy V. Gonzales was not renominated at the party's convention. Democrats Dianne Byrum and Diann Woodward won election, increasing the Democratic majority on the board to 6–2.

=== University of Michigan Board of Regents ===
There were two seats up for election on University of Michigan board of regents on November 4, 2008. One Democratic incumbent, Larry Deitch, sought re-election. Another Democratic incumbent, Rebecca McGowan, did not seek re-election. The election was won by Democrats Deitch and Denise Ilitch. This preserved the 6–2 majority the party held on the board.

=== Wayne State University Board of Governors ===
In the November 4, 2008, general election, incumbent Democrat Paul Massaron sought re-election, while incumbent Democrat Jacquelin Washington decided not to seek re-election. Democrats Massaron and Gary Pollard were elected, preserving the 7–1 Democratic majority on the board.

== Ballot initiatives ==
=== State ballot proposals ===
Michigan approved two state ballot proposals on November 4, 2008. Proposal 1 was a legislative initiative to legalize medical marijuana in state law. Proposal 2 was a state constitutional amendment which lessened restrictions on stem cell research.

== Local elections ==
The following is an incomplete list of 2008 elections in notable localities.

=== Bay County executive election ===
Incumbent Bay County Executive Thomas L. Hickner, a Democrat, was re-elected unopposed.

=== Oakland County executive election ===
Incumbent Republican Oakland County Executive L. Brooks Patterson was re-elected.
