= 2011 in Michigan =

- Decades: 1990s; 2000s; 2010s; 2020s
- See also: History of Michigan; Historical outline of Michigan; List of years in Michigan; 2011 in the United States

This article reviews the top news stories, sports stories, and cultural events occurring during the year 2011 in Michigan.

== Top stories ==
The top news stories of 2011 in Michigan included:

- Rick Snyder's first year as Governor, including debate over his proposed budget cuts and changes in tax law, repeal of Michigan's item pricing law, passage of a new law authorizing emergency financial managers for cities and school districts to cancel union contracts, and his proposal to build a new bridge over the Detroit River;
- The July 7 Grand Rapids shootings in which 34-year-old Rodrick Shonte Dantzler killed seven people and wounded two others in a spree killing in two homes, and including a lengthy car chase, taking of hostages, and ending with Dantzler taking his own life;
- Detroit's financial crisis, as the city approached insolvency and city and state leaders debated whether state intervention was needed;
- A January 23 shootout at Detroit's Northwestern District police station in which a gunman entered the station and opened fire with a pistol-grip shotgun, shooting four officers after his house was raided earlier in the day based on allegations that he kidnapped a 13-year-old girl who he chained to a toilet in a basement and assaulted for nine days;
- The UAW's negotiation of new four-year contracts with the Big Three auto makers, including substantial signing bonuses and profit-sharing for workers.

The top sports stories in Michigan during 2011 included:

- The Detroit Tigers winning the AL Central with Justin Verlander winning the Triple Crown of pitching, the Cy Young Award, and American League Most Valuable Player award, and Miguel Cabrera winning the American League batting title;
- The Detroit Lions advancing to playoffs with Matthew Stafford becoming the fourth quarterback in NFL history with 5,000 passing yards in a season and Calvin Johnson tallying 1,681 receiving yards;
- The Detroit Red Wings winning the Central Division led by Henrik Zetterberg; and
- Michigan football firing Rich Rodriguez, hiring Brady Hoke, and winning the Sugar Bowl.

Notable cultural developments in Michigan during 2011 included: Eminem's two-minute "Imported from Detroit" Super Bowl commercial for Chrysler and promoting Detroit; Michigan artists (Eminem, BeBe & CeCe Winans, and Michael Daugherty) winning five Grammy Awards; the disbanding of The White Stripes; Alice Cooper's induction into the Rock and Roll Hall of Fame; President Obama's White House tribute to Motown; and the death of the "Mother of Motown", Esther Gordy Edwards.

Notable Michigan-related deaths in 2011 included former First Lady Betty Ford; assisted suicide advocate Jack Kevorkian; Meijer founder Fred Meijer; former Congressman Howard Wolpe; former General Motors CEO Robert Stempel; and athletes Jim Northrup, Bubba Smith, Jim Mandich, Robert Traylor, and Lynn Chandnois.

== Office holders ==
=== State office holders ===
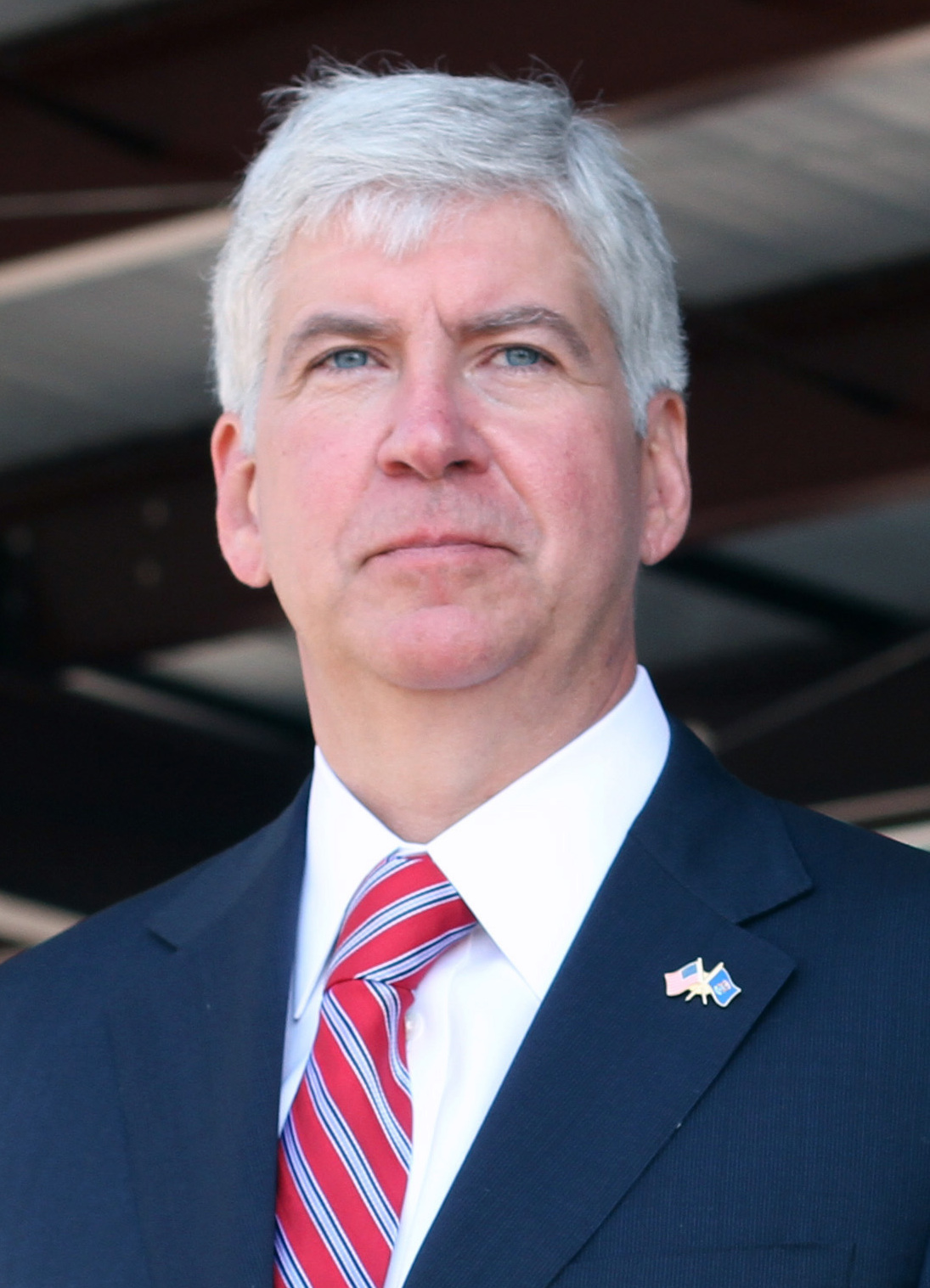
Rick Snyder

- Governor of Michigan: Rick Snyder (Republican)
- Lieutenant Governor of Michigan: Brian Calley (Republican)
- Michigan Attorney General: Bill Schuette (Republican)
- Michigan Secretary of State: Ruth Johnson (Republican)
- Speaker of the Michigan House of Representatives: Jase Bolger (Republican)
- Majority Leader of the Michigan Senate: Randy Richardville (Republican)
- Chief Justice, Michigan Supreme Court: Robert P. Young Jr.

=== Mayors of major cities ===
- Mayor of Detroit: Dave Bing (Democrat)
- Mayor of Grand Rapids: George Heartwell
- Mayor of Warren, Michigan: James R. Fouts
- Mayor of Sterling Heights, Michigan: Richard J. Notte
- Mayor of Ann Arbor: John Hieftje (Democrat)
- Mayor of Dearborn: John B. O'Reilly Jr.
- Mayor of Lansing: Virgil Bernero
- Mayor of Flint: Dayne Walling
- Mayor of Saginaw: Greg Branch

=== Federal office holders ===
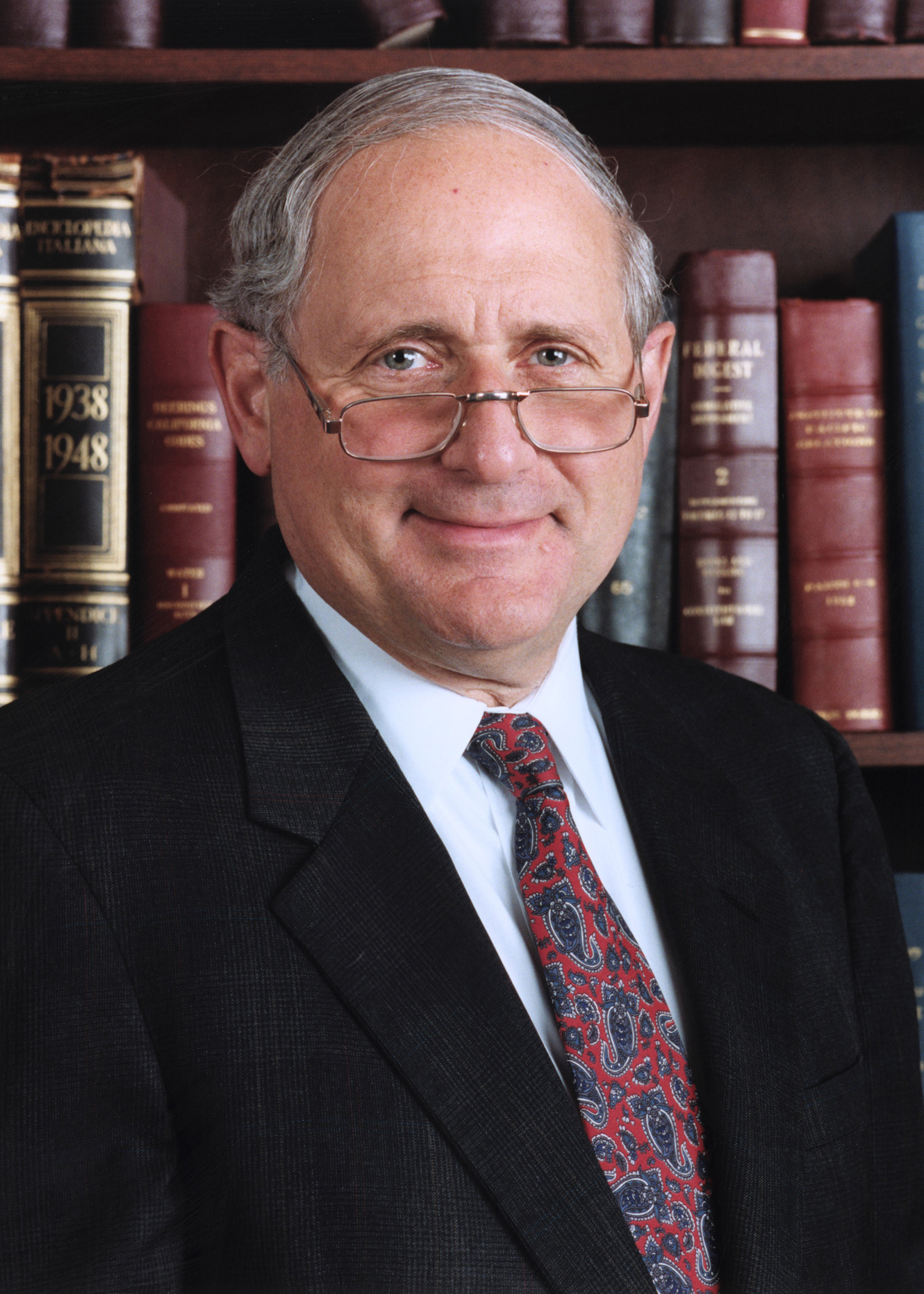
Carl Levin

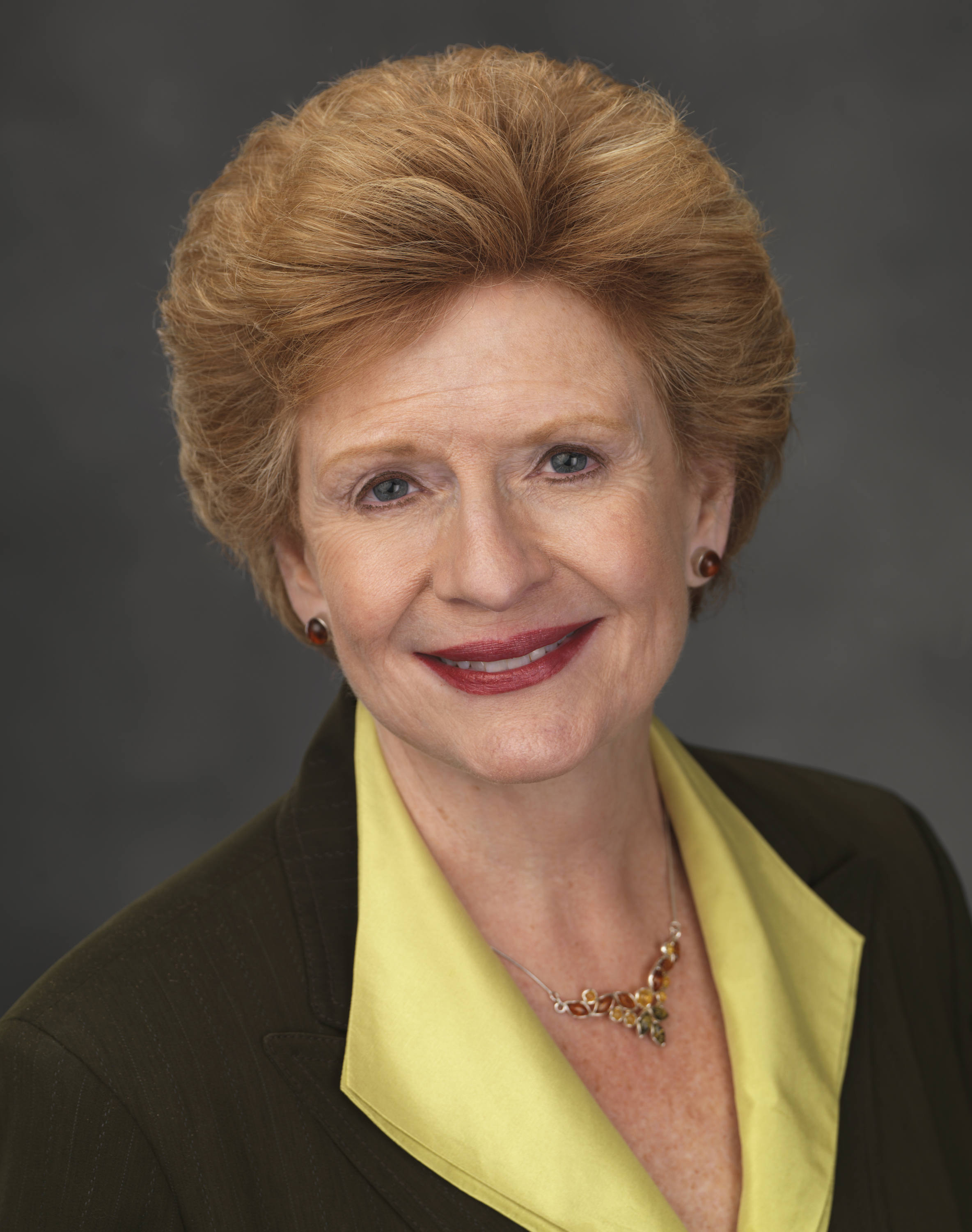
Debbie Stabenow

- U.S. Senator from Michigan: Debbie Stabenow (Democrat)
- U.S. Senator from Michigan: Carl Levin (Democrat)
- House District 1: Dan Benishek (Republican)
- House District 2: Bill Huizenga (Republican)
- House District 3: Justin Amash (Republican)
- House District 4: Dave Camp (Republican)
- House District 5: Dale Kildee (Democrat)
- House District 6: Fred Upton (Republican)
- House District 7: Tim Walberg (Republican)
- House District 8: Mike Rogers (Republican)
- House District 9: Sander Levin (Democrat)
- House District 10: Candice Miller (Republican)
- House District 11: David Curson (Democrat)
- House District 12: John Dingell (Democrat)
- House District 13: John Conyers (Democrat)
- House District 14: Gary Peters (Democrat)

== Sports ==
=== Baseball ===
- 2011 Detroit Tigers season – Under manager Jim Leyland, the Tigers compiled a 95-67 record and finished first in the American League Central. Miguel Cabrera won the AL batting title (.344) and led the team with 48 home runs and 105 RBIs. Justin Verlander won the Triple Crown of pitching (24 wins, 250 strikeouts, 2.40 earned run average), the Cy Young award, and AL MVP award.

=== American football ===
- 2011 Detroit Lions season - Led by head coach Jim Schwartz, the Lions compiled a 10–6 record and lost to the New Orleans Saints in a wild card game. Matthew Stafford became only the fourth quarterback in NFL history to pass for 5,000 yards in a season. Calvin Johnson led the NFL with 1,681 receiving yards.
- 2011 Michigan Wolverines football team - Under head coach Brady Hoke, the Wolverines compiled an 11-2 record, including a victory in the Sugar Bowl.
- 2011 Michigan State Spartans football team - In their fifth season under head coach Mark Dantonio, the Spartans compiled an 11–3 and lost to Georgia in the Outback Bowl. Kirk Cousins led the team with 3,316 passing yards.
- 2011 Wayne State Warriors football team - The Warriors compiled a 12–4 record and advanced to the Division II playoffs where they won four consecutive underdog road victories before losing in the national championship game to No. 1 Pittsburg State.

=== Basketball ===
- 2010–11 Detroit Pistons season - Led by head coach John Kuester, the Pistons compiled a 30–52 record.Tayshaun Prince led the team with 1,098 points scored.
- 2010–11 Michigan Wolverines men's basketball team - In their fourth season under coach John Beilein, the Wolverines compiled a 21–14 record and advanced to the round of 32 in the NCAA tournament. Darius Morris led the team with 526 points scored and 235 assists, and Zack Novak led the team with 203 rebounds.
- 2010–11 Michigan State Spartans men's basketball team - In their 16th year under Tom Izzo, the Spartans compiled a 19–15 record and were eliminated in the round of 64 at the NCAA tournament.

=== Ice hockey ===
- 2010–11 Detroit Red Wings season - Led by coach Mike Babcock, the team compiled a 47-25-10 record and lost to the San Jose Sharks in the conference semifinals. The team's statistical leaders included Henrik Zetterberg (56 assists, 80 points) and Johan Franzen (28 goals). Defenseman Nicklas Lidstrom was the captain.
- 2010–11 Michigan Wolverines men's ice hockey season - Led by head coach Red Berenson, the Wolverines were the national runner up at the Frozen Four. Carl Hagelin led the team in goals (18), assists (31), and points (49).

=== Other ===
- Timothy Bradley vs. Devon Alexander
- 2011 Dow Corning Tennis Classic
- 2011 Pure Michigan 400
- 2011 Heluva Good! Sour Cream Dips 400
- 2011 NCAA Bowling Championship

== Chronology of events ==
=== January ===
- January 1 - Rick Snyder inaugurated as Governor of Michigan. His first 100 days included the repeal of Michigan's item pricing law and passage of a new law authorizing emergency financial managers for cities and school districts to cancel union contracts.
- January 11 - Michigan hired Brady Hoke as its new head football coach.
- January 14 - A Novi man, Mark Schons, killed his wife and two children and then himself.
- January 17 - Peter Karmanos Jr. announced that he would step down as CEO of Compuware, the company he founded.
- January 19 - Gov. Rick Snyder delivered his first State of the State address. He pushed for a second bridge over the Detrit River.
- January 20 - Mary Barra named development chief at General Motors.
- January 23 - A gunman entered at Detroit's Northwestern District police station and opened fire with a pistol-grip shotgun, shooting four officers. The gunman was hit by five shots and killed. The gunman's house had been raided earlier in the day after a 13-year-old girl said she had been kidnapped and assaulted. The girl had been chained to a toilet in a basement for nine days.
- January 24 - Dearborn mosque bombing plot: A 63-year-old California man was arrested and charged with terrorism in the parking lot of the Islamic Center of America. He had powerful fireworks in his vehicle.
- January 28 - Ford Motor Co. reported a $6.6 billion profit for FY 2010 and $5,000 bonus for workers.

=== February ===
- February 2 - The White Stripes announced the end of the band.
- February 4 - Ndamukong Suh selected as the NFL's rookie of the year.
- February 6 - Eminem starred in two-minute Super Bowl commercial ("Imported from Detroit") that praised Detroit and pitched the Chrysler 200.
- February 10 - Los Angeles financier Tom Gores agreed to pay Bill Davidson's widow $420 million for the Detroit Pistons, The Palace of Auburn Hills, and Pine Knob Music Theatre. After multiple delays, the deal closed in April. The NBA approved the sale at the end of May.
- February 13 - At the 53rd Annual Grammy Awards, Eminem won the awards for best rap album ("Recovery") and best rap solo performance ("Not Afraid"). Other Michigan winners were BeBe & CeCe Winans ("Grace" and "Still") and Michael Daugherty ("Deux Ex Machina"). The ceremony included a tribute to Aretha Franklin.
- February 16 - Detroit Tigers star Miguel Cabrera was arrested for driving under the influence of alcohol during spring training in Florida.
- February 24 - President Barack Obama hosted a tribute to Motown at the White House. The event included performances by Smokey Robinson, Stevie Wonder, and Martha Reeves.

=== March ===
- March - Throughout the month, there was debate over Governor Snyder's proposed budget cuts and changes in tax laws.
- March 3 - At a high school basketball game in Fennville, 16-year-old Wes Leonard scored the winning basket as time ran out to give the team its 20th consecutive win. During the post-game celebration, Leonard collapsed and died, his heart having stopped. He was found to have a rare heart disorder, and his death raise questions about screening for such conditions and the importance of proper medical equipment.
- March 12 - Detroit schools emergency financial manager Robert Bobb announced his Renaissance Plan 2012 to convert 41 poorly performing schools into charter school academies.
- March 14 - Detroit native Alice Cooper was inducted into the Rock and Roll Hall of Fame. He was the 18th Detroit performer to be inducted, giving the city 10% of the entire hall of fame.
- March 22 - Results of the 2010 Census showed that Detroit continued to shrink, losing 25% of its population in the decade, while Macomb County grew by 6.7%.

=== April ===
- April - Continued debate over Governor Snyder's budget and his proposals to build a new bridge across the Detroit River and to cut the movie tax credit.
- April 1 - Ford announced that its top two executives, CEO Alan Mulally and executive chairman William Clay Ford Jr. each received $26.5 million as a reward for the company's $6.6 billion 2010 profit.
- April 1 - Dennis Rodman's jersey was retired in a ceremony at The Palace.
- April 4 - Detroit Symphony Orchestra musicians voted to return to work.
- April 7 - Dan Gilbert's Quicken Loans bought the 14-story Chase Tower, the former NBD headquarters, in downtown Detroit. Gilbert renamed it The Qube and relocated 4,000 of the company's employees to the facility.

=== May ===
- May 12 - Governor Snyder's sweeping changes to Michigan tax policy passed, including a $1.7-billion business tax cut and increases in taxes on individuals.
- May 17 - Bob Seger, at age 66, played the first of four concerts at The Palace in Auburn Hills.
- May 17 - Michigan State's Gene Washington and Michigan's Lloyd Carr were elected to the College Football Hall of Fame.
- May 24 - Chrysler repaid in full and ahead of schedule all the money it borrowed from the U.S. and Canadian governments.

=== June ===
- June 22 - Nicklas Lidstrom won the Norris Trophy for the seventh time in his career.
- June 26 - The Detroit Tigers retire Sparky Anderson's jersey No. 11 at a ceremony at Comerica Park.

=== July ===
- July 7 - 2011 Grand Rapids shootings: 34-year-old Rodrick Shonte Dantzler killed seven people and wounded two others in a spree killing in Grand Rapids.

=== August ===
- August 2 - Kwame Kilpatrick was released from state prison after serving 14 months for violating his terms of probation in connection with the Kilpatrick and Beatty text-messaging scandal and Kilpatrick-Beatty criminal trial. The federal public corruption case remained pending against him.
- August 3 - In the Tamara Greene wrongful death case, Magistrate Judge Steven Whalen urged the judge to assess legal fees and tell the jury that the city "intentionally, willfully and recklessley" failed to preserve emails relating to the slaying of the exotic dancer.
- August 10 - Detroit native Philip Levine, known for his poems about working-class Detroit, Was named as the 18th poet laureatee by the Librarian of Congress.
- August 20 - Woodward Dream Cruise
- August 21 - Wing walker Todd Green fell 200 feet to his death before a crowd of 75,000 at the Selfridge Air Show.
- August 25 - Aretha Franklin concert at DTE Energy Music Theatre
- August 27 - Justin Verlander won his 20th game of the season, the firsst Tiger to reach the mark in 20 years.

=== September ===
- September 5 - President Obama saluted the auto recovery and vowed to defend union rights in Detroit speech.
- September 7 - Three former Detroit Red Wings players (Brad McCrimmon, Ruslan Salei and Stefan Liv died in a plane crash in Russia.
- September 10 - Michigan defeated Notre Dame, 35–31, in the first night game at Michigan Stadium.
- September 12 - Co-defendant Derrick Miller agreed to a plea deal requiring him to testify against former Detroit mayor Kwame Kilpatrick in bribery prosecution.
- September 17 - General Motors and UAW agree to four-year contract.

=== October ===
- October 4 - Ford reached agreement with the UAW, including $6,000 signing bonuses for workers with over one year of seniority and accelerated profit-sharing of $3,752 based on profit in first half of 2011.
- October 7 - Two films shot in Michigan (The Ides of March and Real Steel) opened in theaters.
- October 12 - Underwear bomber Umar Farouk Abdulmutallab pleaded guilty to charges against him, including the attempted use of a weapon of mass destruction and the attempted murder of the 289 people on Northwest Airlines Flight 253. At the hearing, he warned America to stop killing innocent Muslims.
- October 13 - Police officer Trevor Slot was killed in a chase following a bank robbery at the ChoiceOne Bank in Ravenna. Slot was struck by the robbers' vehicle as he tried to lay down stop strips.
- October 15 - The Detroit Tigers lost to the Texas Rangers in the fifth and final game of the 2011 American League Championship Series.
- October 20 - Gov. Snyder's proposal to build a second bridge over the Detroit River failed to gain approval in Michigan Senate.

=== November ===
- November 1 - U.S. District Judge Gerald E. Rosen issued a 102-page decision dismissing the wrongful death lawsuit filed by the family of Tamara Greene. After six years of contentious litigation, Rosen found no evidence that Kwame Kilpatrick or other city officials obstructed or interfered with the investiation into Greene's murder. Two weeks later, on November 17, Judge Rosen ruled that he would release much of the sealed transcripts, affidavits and other documents in the case.
- November 2 - Detroit mayor Dave Bing said that the city was sliding closer to insolvency and may run out of money by February and need a state-appointed emergency manager.
- November 8 - Detroit voters approved a new city charter.
- November 9 - Republican Presidential debate at Oakland University features eight candidates, including Mitt Romney, Herman Cain, Rick Perry, and Rick Santorum.
- November 14 - An internal report was leaked indicating that, without cuts, Detroit would be out of cash by April.
- November 16 - Justin Verlander won the Cy Young Award.
- November 18 - Detroit mayor Dave Bing announced layoffs of 1,000 city workers.
- November 21 - Justin Verlander won the American League MVP award.
- November 23 - Detroit mayor Dave Bing blasts city council and unions for failing to accept his proposals to stave off insolvency.
- November 24 - Ndamukong Suh ejected from the Lions' Thanksgiving Day game after stomping an opposing player. He was suspended for two games.
- November 26 - Michigan beat Ohio State for the first time since 2003.
- November 29 - Dave Bing said he didn't want emergency manager job, insisted Detroit could manage its financial crisis.
- November 30 - Brady Hoke named Big Ten coach of the year.

=== December ===
- December 1 - Detroit mayor Dave Bing insisted the city could fix its financial crisis, but Gov. Rick Snyder advised that time was running out. The next day, Michigan Treasurer Andy Dillon ordered a review of the city's finances. One week later, Snyder suggested a consent deal with Detroit, but threatened an emergency manager if no agreement was reached.
- December 6 - U.S. District Judge Gerald E. Rosen ordered the city of Detroit to pay $167,000 of the $735,000 in attorneys fees sought by the Tamara Greene family's lawyers led by Norman Yatooma. The fees were for work in trying to prove the city destroyed emails, Rosen finding that the city and its law departement behaved badly and "have only themselves to blame for this self-inflicted wound."
- December 13 - U.S. Trnsporation Ray LaHood informed Detroit mayor Dave Bing that the plan to build light rail along Woodward Avenue was scrapped due to concerns that the city would be unable to pay operating costs over the long term.
- December 17 - The Wayne State football team played in, but lost, the Division II national championship game.
- December 21 - A state report found that Detroit's financial crisis was deeper than previously reported with $12.3 billion in debt.

== Deaths ==
The following is a list of deaths during 2011 of notable individuals associated with Michigan:

- January 11 - Bernadine Newsom Denning, anti-nuclear activist, at age 80 or 81
- January 14 - Mary P. Sinclair, environmental activist, at age 92
- January 31 - Michael Tolan, actor, at age 85
- February 14 - James Giftos, founder of National Coney Island
- February 22 - Dwayne McDuffie, comic book writer, at age 49
- February 23 - James Damman, lieutenant governor (1975-79), at age 78
- February 26 - Ed Frutig, All-American end at Michigan, at age 92
- February 26 - Zhu Guangya, Chinese nuclear physicist and University of Michigan alumnus, at age 86
- March 29 - Jim Seymour, All-American wide receiver and Royal Oak Shrine alumnus, at age 64
- April 19 - Lynn Chandnois, MSU All-American back (1948-50), at age 86
- April 19 Norm Masters, MSU All-American tackle 1955, at age 77
- April 26 - Jim Mandich, U-M tight end (1967-69), College Football Hall of Fame, at age 62
- May 7 - Robert Stempel, chairman/CEO General Motors (1990-92), at age 77
- May 11 - Robert Traylor, U-M basketball (1995-98), at age 34
- May 15 - John Feikens, US District Court Judge in Detroit, at age 93
- May 19 - Don H. Barden, first black casino owner in Las Vegas, at age 67
- June 3 - Jack Kevorkianj, euthanasia advocate,
- June 4 - Lilian Jackson Braun, Detroit Free Press editor and author of The Cat Who... books, at age 97
- June 8 - Jim Northrup, Detroit Tigers (1964-74), at age 71
- June 28 - Newt Loken, UM gymnastics coach for 36 years, at age 92
- June 30 - Barry Bremen, "The Great Imposter" and a native of metro Detroit, at age 64
- July 2 - Reeve Maclaren Bailey, icthyologist, at age 100
- July 8 - Betty Ford, former First Lady, at age 93
- July 20 - Jim Maddock, U-M quarterback (1954-56), at age 76
- August 3 - Bubba Smith, defensive end at Michigan State (1964–1966), College Football Hall of Fame, at age 66
- August 3 - Jackie Hudson, Dominican nun and anti-nuclear weapons activist, at age 76
- August 9 - Eleanor Josaitis, civi rights activist and co-founder of Focus: HOPE, at age 73
- August 17 - Warren Samuels, Michigan State economics professor, at age 77
- August 24 - Esther Gordy Edwards, created Motown Museum, known as "Mother of Motown", at age 91
- September 20 - Marv Tarplin, guitarist for The Miracles, at age 70
- September 27 - Dave Hill, golfer, at age 74
- October 25 - Howard Wolpe, US Congress (1979-93), at age 71
- November 1 - Arthur Johnson, human rights activist, educator and arts advocate, at age 85
- November 25 - Frederik Meijer, founder of Meijer, at age 91
- November 29 - Carl Robie, U-M swimmer and Olympic silver medalist, at age 66
- December 7 - Harry Morgan, actor and Detroit native, at age 96
- December 14 - Mark Francis Schmitt, bishop of Marquette, at age 88
- December 17 - Harley Sewell, Detroit Lions guard/linebacker (1953-62), at age 80

== See also ==
- History of Michigan
- History of Detroit
