= Former 6th Precinct 'McGraw Station', Detroit =

Former 6th Precinct Station
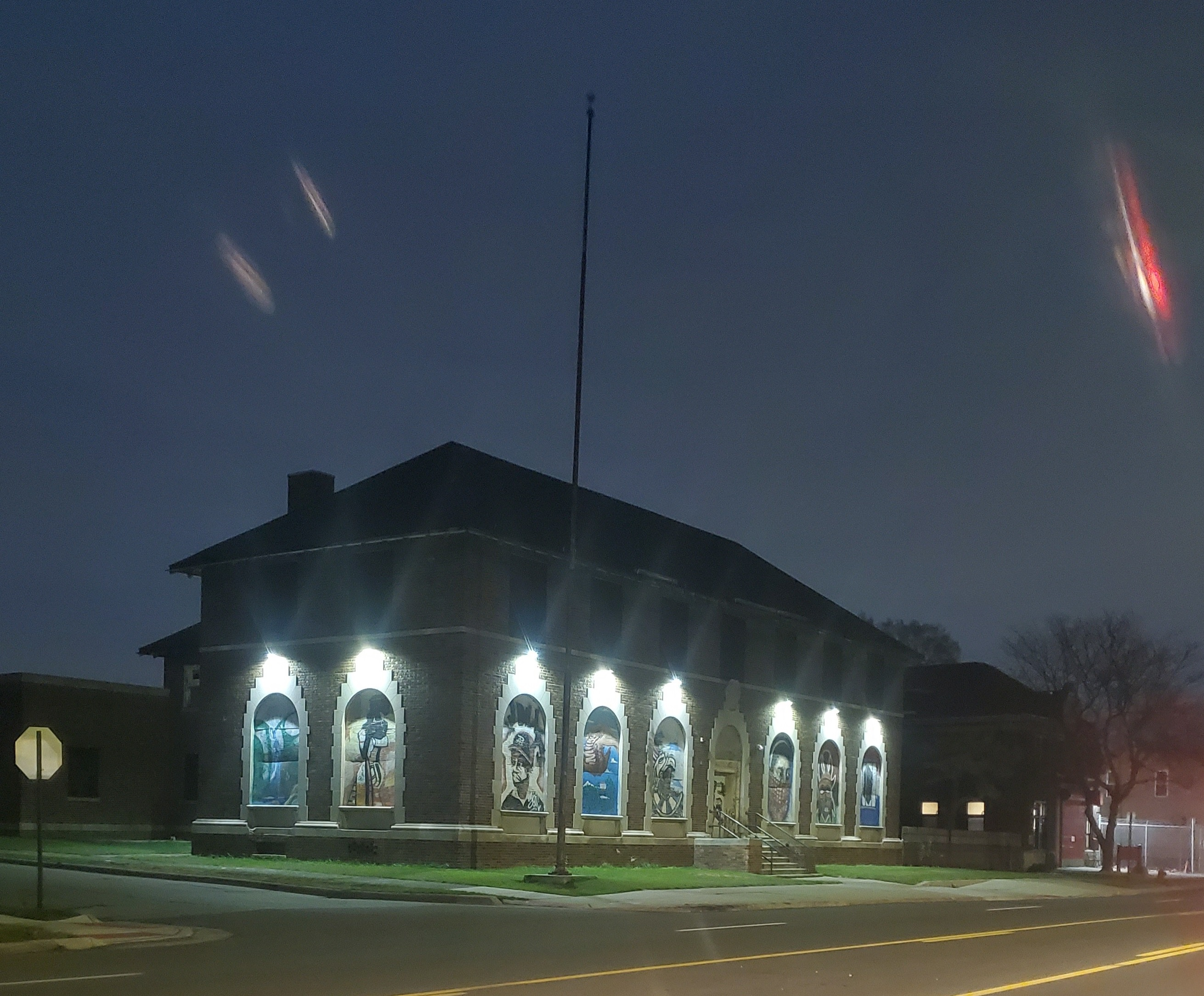
- Alternative names: McGraw Station, Gang Squad Headquarters

General information
- Status: Currently being restored
- Architectural style: Beaux-Arts
- Location: 6840 McGraw Avenue, Detroit, Michigan
- Groundbreaking: June 19, 1930
- Completed: October, 1930
- Renovated: 2013
- Closed: 2005
- Cost: $83,100
- Owner: Ed Steele

Height
- Height: 3 stories, plus basement

Technical details
- Material: Brick, Limestone, Poured Concrete
- Floor count: 3
- Floor area: 26,274 sq ft (2,440.9 m^{2})

Design and construction
- Architects: Van Leyen, Schilling & Keough

The former 6th Precinct 'McGraw Station' (also known as the Sixth Precinct, or McGraw Station) is a historic building located at 6840 McGraw Avenue, in Detroit, Michigan. The station served as the police station for the Detroit Police Department's sixth police precinct for over 56 years, covering a portion of Southwest Detroit neighborhoods from 1930 until 1986. It served another 19 years (from 1986 until 2005) as Gang Squad Headquarters for the Detroit Special Crimes Section. The building was abandoned from 2005 until 2013, when a private owner purchased it from the city. It is presently being restored.

== History ==
=== Construction (1930) ===
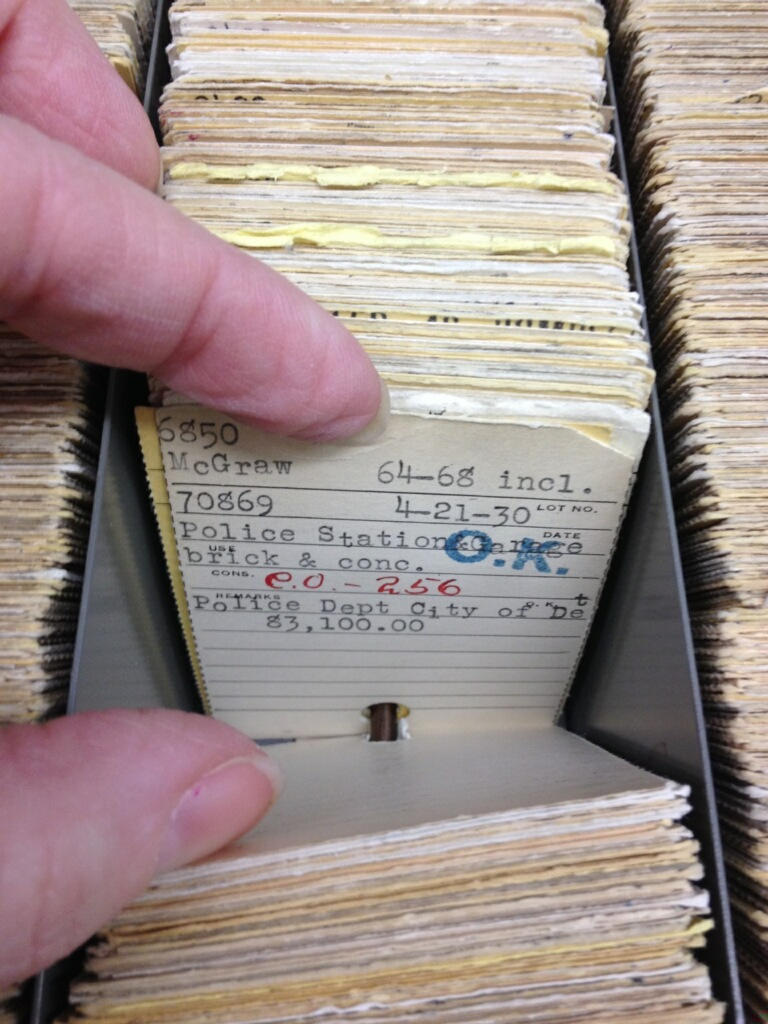
Building Permit on File at the City of Detroit's Building Department.

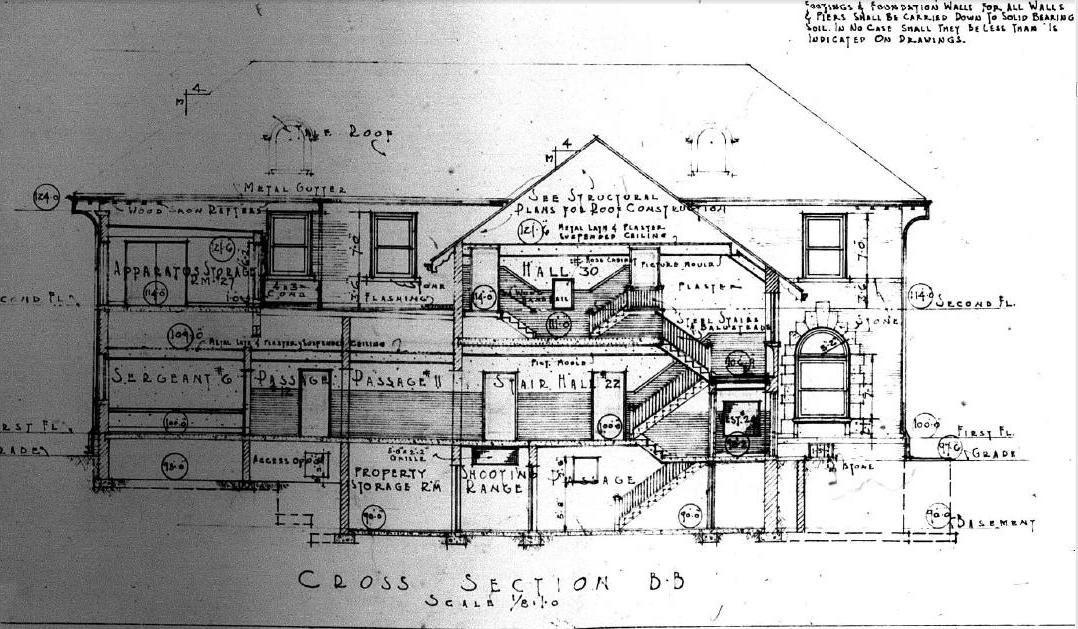
McGraw Station Cross Section from the Original Blueprints

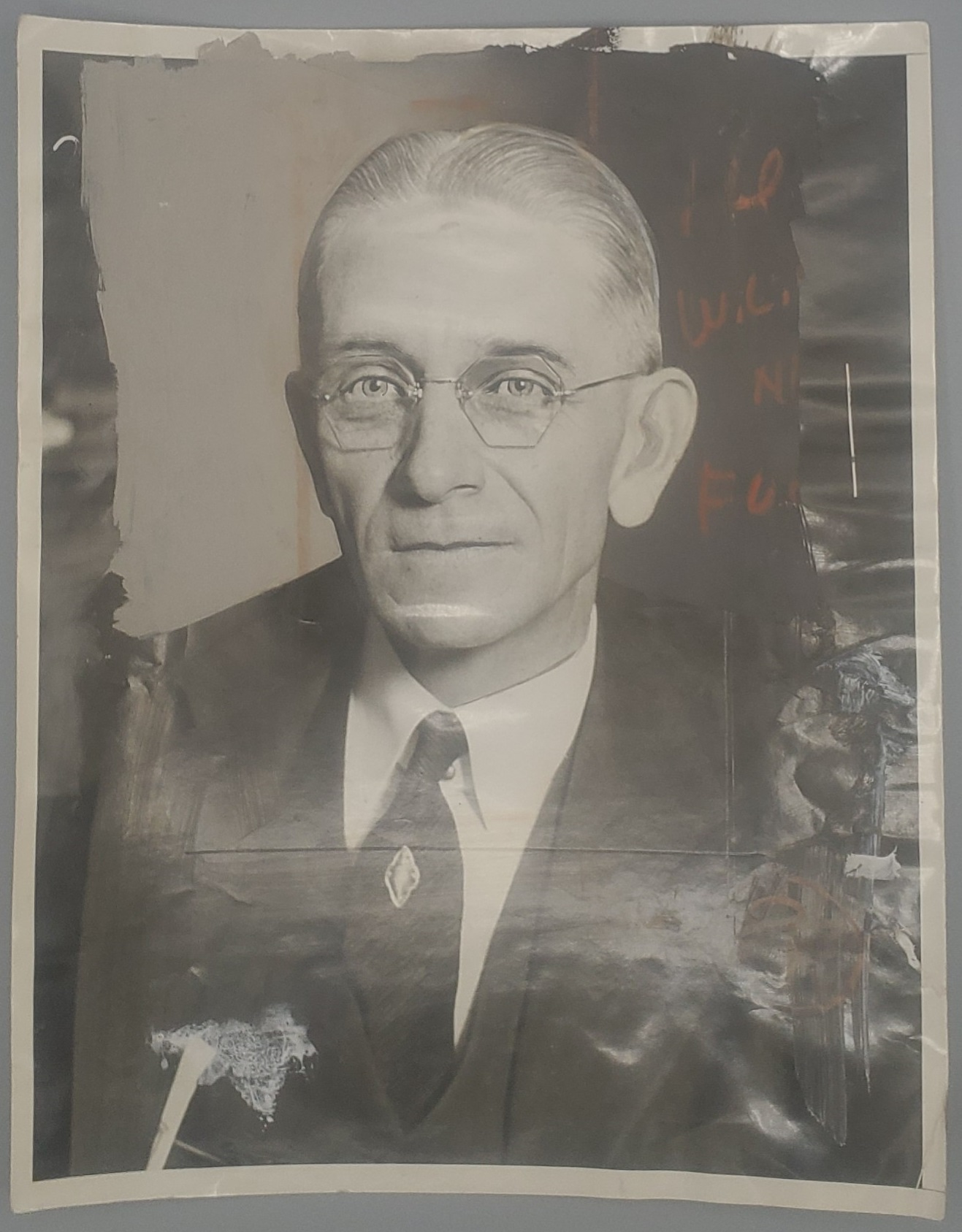
Former Detroit Police Commissioner Thomas C. Wilcox. Photo taken May 27, 1930.

The McGraw Station was designed by the architecture firm of Van Leyen, Schilling & Keough and is considered to be of the Beaux-Arts architectural style. Originally conceived as an economic stimulus project to create jobs, Police Commissioner Thomas C. Wilcox, who later became Wayne County Sheriff, conducted a groundbreaking ceremony on June 19, 1930. The building permit on file with the City of Detroit Building Department is permit number 70869, dated April 21, 1930, and the project construction cost was listed as US$ 83,100. The address was erroneously listed on the permit as 6850 McGraw Avenue. All official references to the precinct list the address as 6840 McGraw Avenue. The original blueprints are in the public domain and remain on file at the City of Detroit. They are complete with materials requirements, construction methods required, each room's intended usage, and all interior and exterior dimensions.

=== 6th Precinct Station era (1930–1986) ===
The McGraw Station became operational in the fall of 1930, replacing the previous station building at 3545 Vinewood Street. The station features a nearly 6,000 square foot garage with two secure doors for vehicle ingress and egress. At the time, very few of the other operational precinct stations in Detroit had an attached garage where persons being placed under arrest were unloaded from police vehicles indoors and then brought into the cell block section of the building. This feature was considered to be a significant innovation during the era, and is an early example of a type of modern-day manual Mantrap.

The DPD had already been established as an innovator, being the first police force in the United States to use radio dispatch technology, which they deployed in 1921.

In 1986 the station operations for the 6th Precinct were moved to a building located at 11450 Warwick Street, where they remain to present day.

=== Gang Squad era (1986–2005) ===
Once the building was vacated in 1986, a division of the Detroit Police Department, the Gang Enforcement Section, commonly referred to as the Gang Squad, utilized the building as their headquarters, where they remained in operation for over nineteen years, until the building was closed in October 2005, due to budget cuts. During this time, the building was commonly referred to as the Gang Squad Headquarters.

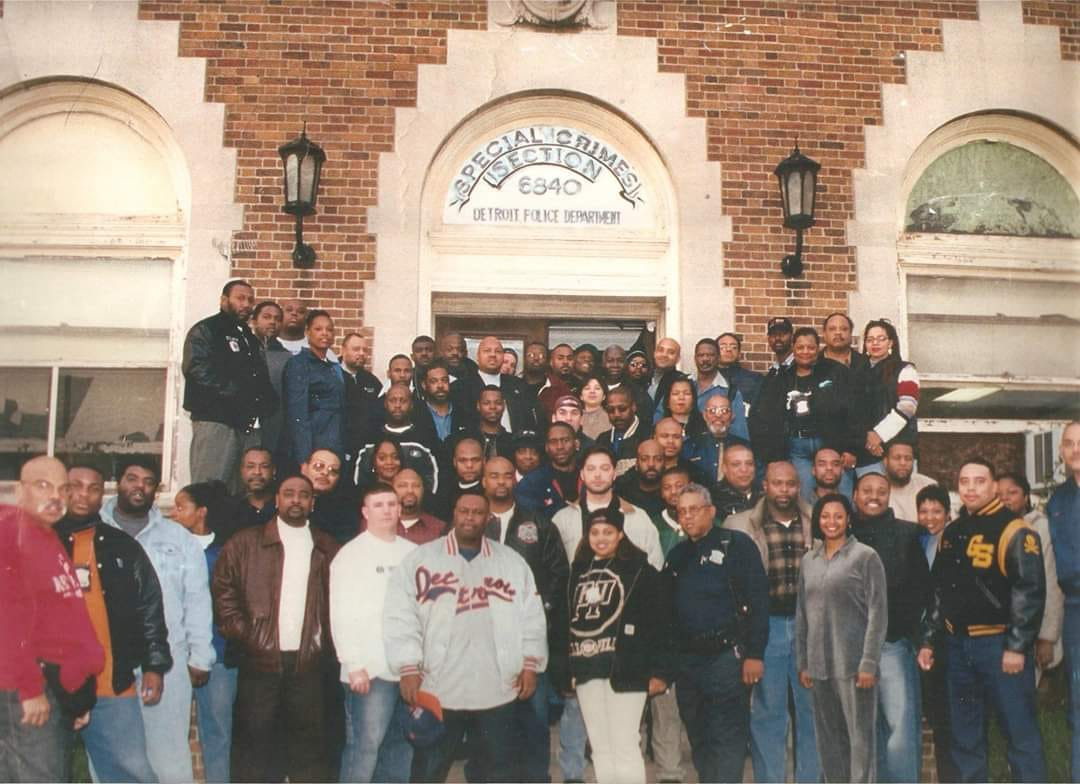
McGraw Station Gang Squad Headquarters front steps, circa 1996.

After the Gang Squad left in 2005, the building was quickly attacked by scrappers and vandals. It sat vacant and in disrepair for almost nine years, until 2013, when the current owner, Ed Steele, negotiated a purchase with the City of Detroit, promising repair jobs, and later, high tech jobs and urban renewal as part of the purchase agreement.

=== Restoration and Rescue activity (2013–present) ===
Since 2013, the present owner has been engaging a mixture of underemployed, unemployed, unskilled, homeless and "at-risk" members of the local community to assist with cleanup, material handling, security, repair and restoration efforts. Those efforts have been significant and, as of January 2021, have been taking place continuously for over 7 years.

=== Future plans ===
The 6th Precinct McGraw Station consists of a basement and three additional levels. The building measures 26,274 square feet. The Jail Cell Area is being repurposed to become a Secure Cloud Computing Data Center. The top level, which was the gymnasium and consists of a regulation size half-court basketball court, is being transformed to a shared workspace for Technology Oriented Businesses. The basement has a shooting range that is being restored and returned to operational status. The main level is being repurposed to provide meeting space and retail space for a coffee shop, small retail shops and general office space.

A tribute room containing significant historical artifacts from the Pontiac Silverdome, including the entire floor being carpeted with a portion of artificial turf containing the actual 40 yard line markings, is planned. This is to honor the fact that functional elements of the project (by way of example, the 150kW Diesel Standby Generator) were won at auction and removed from the Silverdome before it was demolished. An artifact display containing numerous items found during the restoration effort is also set to be created using the entire original Precinct Commander's office. This is being done to highlight an extensive collection of genuine documents found onsite from every decade that the station operated, from the 1930s to the 2000s.

== Historical significance ==
The station has been directly involved in multiple incidents of civil unrest.

It was breached during the 1943 Detroit race riot, where police officers were forced to vacate, and prisoners were set free.

On October 10, 1965, a Police incident involving Emorell Legett took place during a traffic stop and subsequent arrest. An expanded investigation took place regarding the beating and violence perpetrated upon Leggett, who was pregnant at the time. The investigation was closed after being ruled an "allegation not sustained", and this caused citizens to become outraged and file an official complaint with the NAACP.

Then, on July 25, 1967, the station came under attack again, this time from sniper fire, during the 1967 Detroit riot. Members of the National Guard were photographed while returning fire from the front lobby.

In February 1979 the station came under sniper fire from an unknown assailant, possibly from the Munger Junior High School or the grounds of the Chadsey High School.

== In popular culture ==
Information concerning deaths that have occurred at the station and within the precinct neighborhood came to light through news stories found in media archives, and directly from a number of first person accounts given by former officers who have worked at the precinct over the years. Those accounts led to public interest from a number of Paranormal Investigation Groups located in Detroit and neighboring States. Those groups were permitted safe entry to the building numerous times for investigations they conducted between 2014 and 2018. In 2019, the Travel Channel produced an episode of their program "Most Terrifying Places" and in 2020, an episode of their program "Haunted Case Files" that included the 6th Precinct. Both episodes presented information related to Paranormal Activity reported by a number of visiting paranormal groups that had performed investigations at the site.

The building was listed by the Michigan Film Office as a potential filming location for cinema or video productions.
