= Proposition (disambiguation) =

A proposition is a statement expressing something that is either true or false.

Proposition may also refer to:

== Mathematics ==
- Proposition (mathematics), sort of theorem

== Politics ==
- Ballot proposition, a piece of proposed legislation to be approved or rejected by eligible voters
  - California ballot proposition, a referendum or initiative measure in California
- Popular initiative, a form of direct democracy by which a petition meeting certain hurdles can force a legal procedure on a proposition.
- Proposition (political party), a political party in Ukraine
- A term describing political parties, factions and individuals in a legislature who are favorable and supportive of the incumbent government, as against the opposition.

== Art and entertainment ==
- The Proposition (painting), 1631 genre painting by Judith Leyster
- The Proposition, 1996 film starring Theresa Russell
- The Proposition (1998 film), 1998 film starring Kenneth Branagh
- The Proposition (2005 film), a 2005 film written by Nick Cave
  - The Proposition (soundtrack), the film's soundtrack recorded by Nick Cave
- Propositions (album), a 1982 album by The Bar-Kays
- "The Proposition", a 2008 episode of web series SPAMasterpiece Theater

== Other uses ==
- Proposition bet, a bet made regarding the occurrence during a game of an event not directly affecting the outcome
- Value proposition, in business the promise of a value to be delivered
- Hypothesis, a proposed explanation for a phenomenon
- In certain debate styles, the proposition team supports and tries to prove a motion. In contrast, the opposition team refutes the motion.

== See also ==
- Proposal (disambiguation)
- Propositional calculus, branch of logic concerned with the study of propositions
- Sexual proposition (disambiguation)
