= 2009 in Michigan =

- Decades: 1980s; 1990s; 2000s; 2010s; 2020s
- See also: History of Michigan; Historical outline of Michigan; List of years in Michigan; 2009 in the United States

This article reviews key circumstances during 2009 in Michigan, including the state's office holders, performance of sports teams, cultural events, a chronology of the state's top news and sports stories, and Michigan-related deaths.

== Top stories ==
The top news stories in Michigan included:

- The 2008–2010 automotive industry crisis with General Motors Corporation and Chrysler going through bankruptcy and reorgazing as new companies, all as a condition to additional federal financial aid;
- Michigan's unemployment rate leading the nation, reaching 15.3% in September;
- Indictment and resignation of Detroit mayor Kwame Kilpatrick and the election of Dave Bing To replace him;
- The attempted underwear bombing of Northwest Airlines Flight 253 by Al-Qaeda follower Umar Farouk Abdulmutallab;
- The closure of The Ann Arbor News.

Top sports stories included:

- The 2008–09Detroit Red Wings advncing to the Stanley Cup Final where they lost to the Philadelphia Flyers;
- The 2008–09 Michigan State Spartans basketball team advancing to the NCAA championship game where they lost to North Carolina;
- The deaths of Detroit sports legends George Kell, Mark Fidrych and Chuck Daly.

Other notable Michigan-related deaths i 2009 included Robert McNamara, John Hugnes, and Soupy Sales.

== Office holders ==
=== State office holders ===
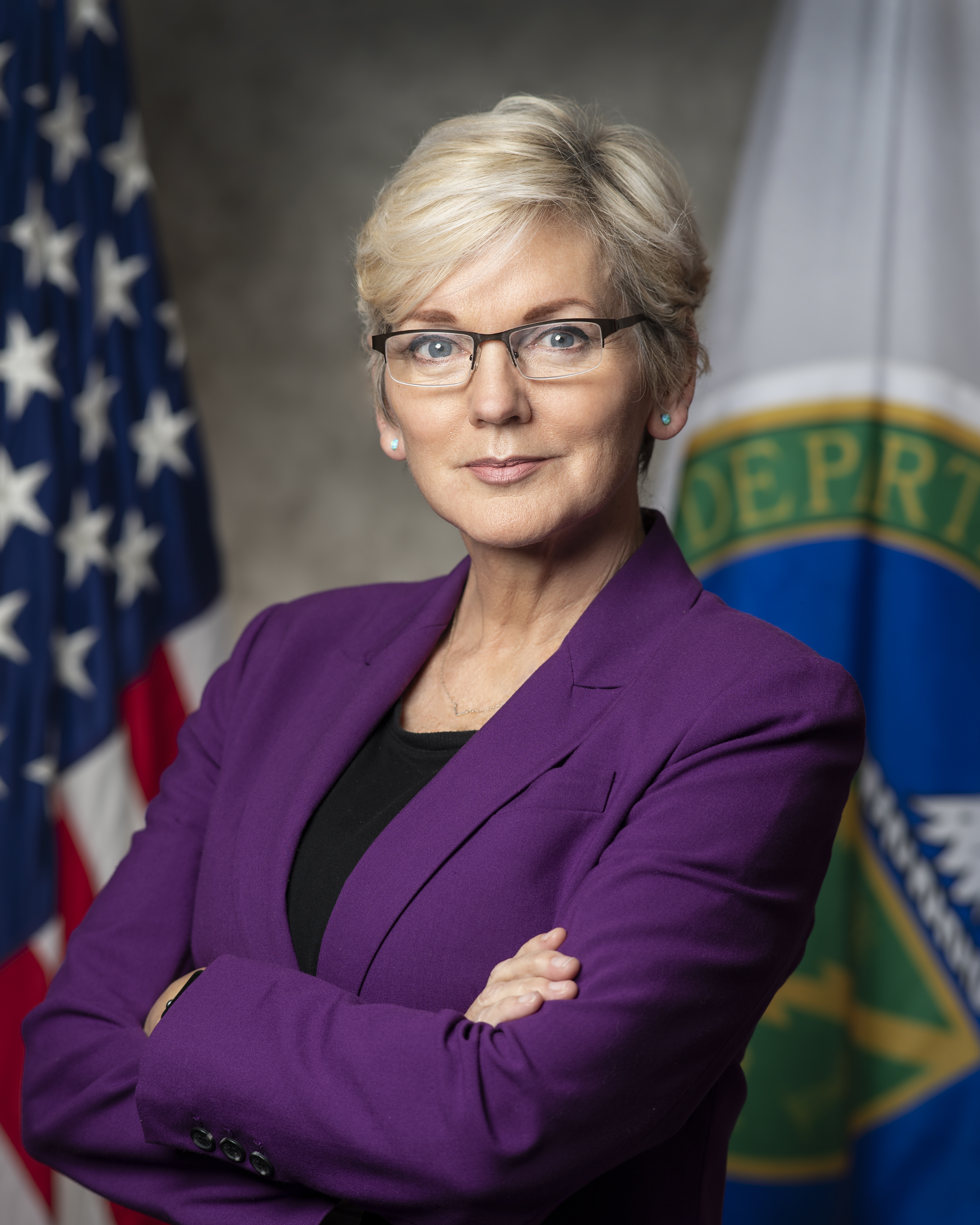
Jennifer Granholm

- Governor of Michigan - Jennifer Granholm (Democrat)
- Lieutenant Governor of Michigan: John D. Cherry (Democrat)
- Michigan Attorney General - Mike Cox (Republican)
- Michigan Secretary of State - Terri Lynn Land (Republican)
- Speaker of the Michigan House of Representatives: Andy Dillon (Democrat)
- Majority Leader of the Michigan Senate: Mike Bishop (Republican)
- Chief Justice, Michigan Supreme Court: Marilyn Jean Kelly

=== Federal office holders ===
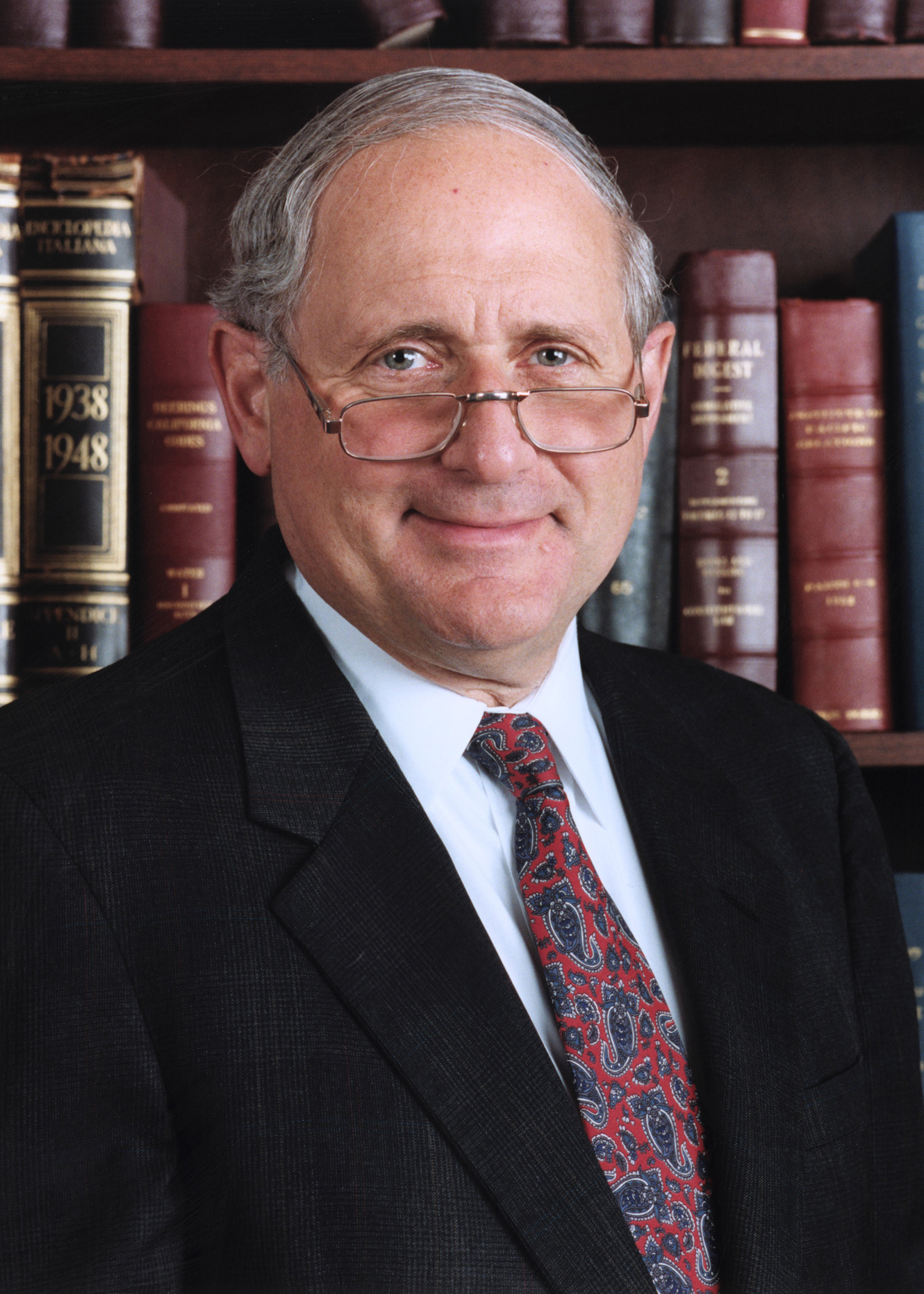
Carl Levin

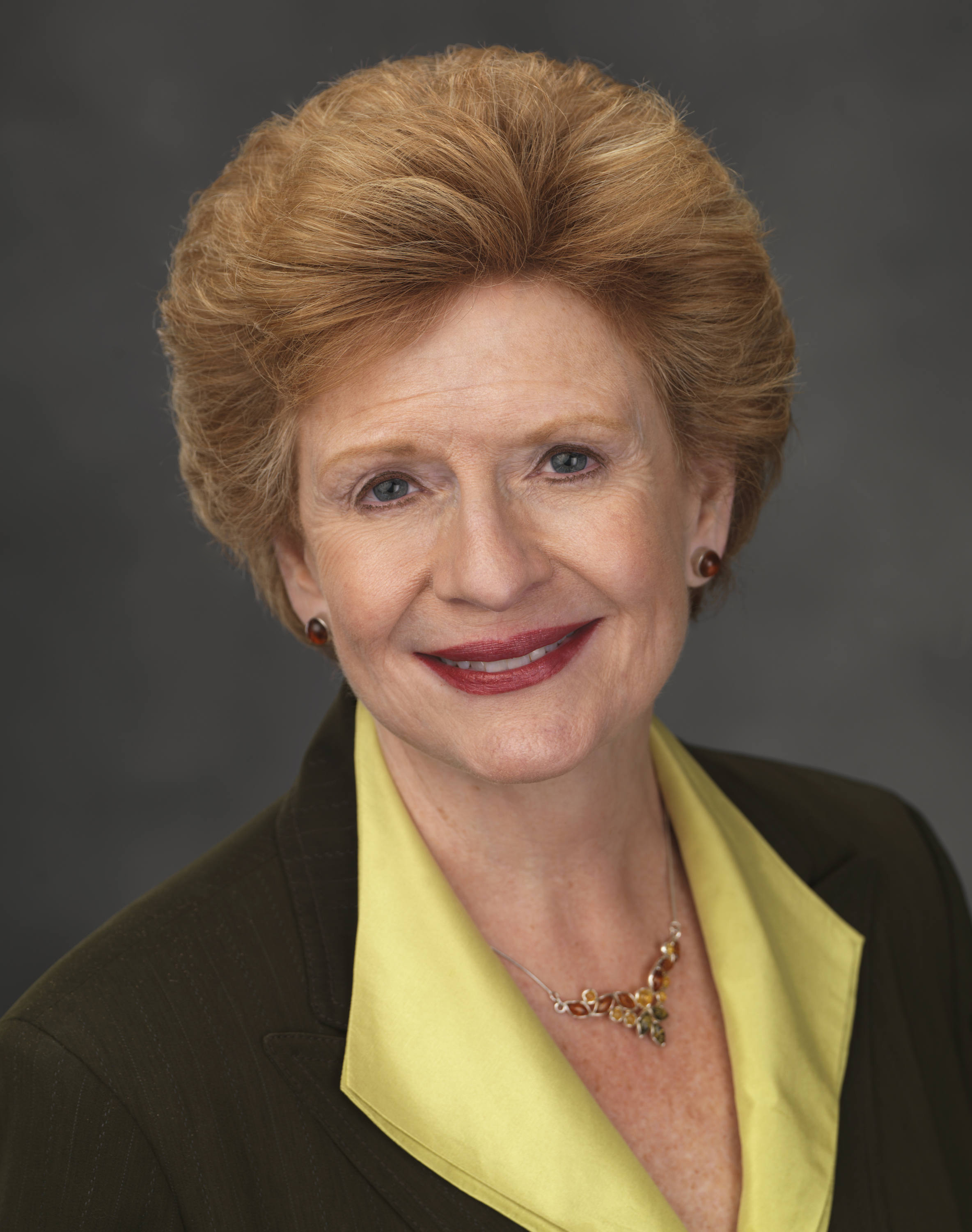
Debbie Stabenow

- U.S. Senator from Michigan - Carl Levin (Democrat)
- U.S. Senator from Michigan - Debbie Stabenow (Democrat)
- House District 1: Bart Stupak (Democrat)
- House District 2: Pete Hoekstra (Republican)
- House District 3: Vern Ehlers (Republican)
- House District 4: Dave Camp (Republican)
- House District 5: Dale Kildee (Democrat)
- House District 6: Fred Upton (Republican)
- House District 7: Tim Walberg (Republican)
- House District 8: Mike Rogers (Republican)
- House District 9: Gary Peters (Democrat)
- House District 10: Candice Miller (Republican)
- House District 11: Thaddeus McCotter (Republican)
- House District 12: Sander Levin (Democrat)
- House District 13: Carolyn Cheeks Kilpatrick (Democrat)
- House District 14: John Conyers (Democrat)
- House District 15: John Dingell (Democrat)

=== Mayors of major cities ===
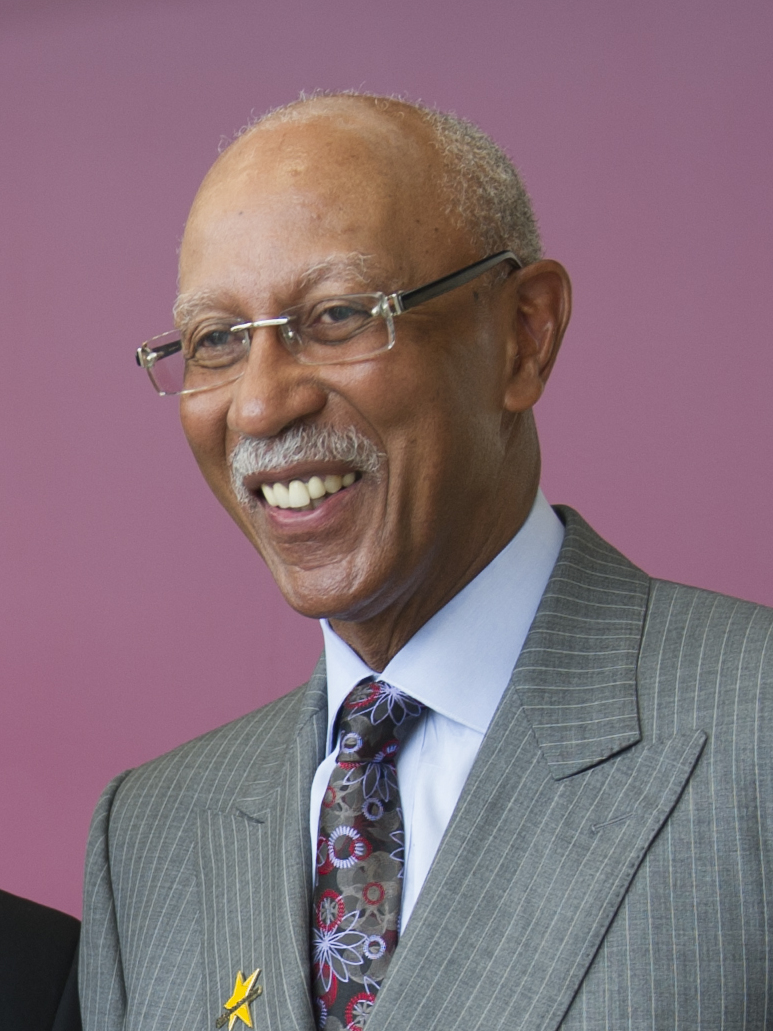
Dave Bing

- Mayor of Detroit: - Dave Bing (Democrat)
- Mayor of Grand Rapids: - George Heartwell
- Mayor of Ann Arbor: John Hieftje (Democrat)
- Mayor of Lansing: Virgil Bernero
- Mayor of Flint: Dayne Walling
- Mayor of Saginaw: Greg Branch

== Sports ==
=== Baseball ===
- 2009 Detroit Tigers season - In their fourth year under manager Jim Leyland, the Tigers compiled an 86–77 record. Miguel Cabrera led the team with a .324 batting average, 34 home runs, and 103 RBIs. Justin Verlander compiled a 19–9 record with a 3.45 earned run average and 269 strikeouts.

=== American football ===
- 2009 Detroit Lions season - In their first season under head coach Jim Schwartz, the Lions compiled a 2–14 record.
- 2009 Michigan State Spartans football team - In their third season under head coach Mark Dantonio, the Spartans compiled a 6–7 record.
- 2009 Michigan Wolverines football team - In their second season under head coach Rich Rodriguez, the Wolverines compiled a 5–7 record. Brandon Graham was selected as the team's most valuable player. Brandon Minor and Tate Forcier were the team's leading rusher and passer, respectively.

=== Basketball ===
- 2008–09 Detroit Pistons season - Led by head coach Michael Curry, the Pistons compiled a 39–43 record.
- 2009 Detroit Shock season - Led by head coaches Bill Laimbeer (first four games) and Rick Mahorn (remaining 30 games), the Shock compiled an 18–16 record.
- 2008–09 Michigan State Spartans men's basketball team - In their 14the season under head coach Tom Izzo, the Spartans compiled a 31–7, won the Big Ten regular season championship, and lost to North Carolina in the NCAA championship game.
- 2008–09 Michigan Wolverines men's basketball team - In their second season under head coach John Beilein, the Wolverines compiled a 21–14 record and advanced to the Round of 32 in the NCAA tournament
- 2008–09 Michigan State Spartans women's basketball team - The Spartans advanced to the Sweet Sixteen.

=== Ice hockey ===
- 2008–09 Detroit Red Wings season - In their fourth season under head coach Mike Babcock, the Red Wings compiled a 51–21–10 record and advanced to the 2009 Stanley Cup Final where they lost to the Philadelphia Flyers.
- 2008–09 Michigan Wolverines men's ice hockey season - Led by head coach Red Berenson, the Red Wings compiled a 28–10–0 record. Louie Caporusso led the team with 22 goals.

=== Other ===
- 2009 Carfax 400
- 2009 LifeLock 400

== Chronology of events ==
=== May ===
- May 5 - The 2009 Detroit mayoral special election was scheduled when Kwame Kilpatrick resigned after being indicted for obstruction of justice. Dave Bing won with 51.7% of the votes, defeating Kenneth Cockrel Jr. with 47.2%.

=== November ===
- November 3 - In the 2009 Detroit mayoral election, Dave Bing received 56.2% of the votes to defeat Tom Barrow with 40.7%.
- November 16 - Murder of Jamar Pinkney Jr.: Jamar Pinkney Sr. murdered his 15-year-old son, Jamar Pinkney Jr. in an execution-style shooting in Detroit. Pinkney Sr. said that Pinkney Jr. had admitted to sexually assaulting his thre-year old half-sister before he assaulted him, forced him to take off his clothes, marched him down the street while naked to a vacant lot, forced him to kneel and shot him in the head.

=== December ===
- December 25 - Al-Qaeda member Umar Farouk Abdulmutallab attempted to down Northwest Airlines Flight 253 as it approached to Detroit from. He sought to detonated chemical explosives sewn into his underwear. While a small explosion and fire occurred, the exposive device failed to detonate properly. He was arraigned on January 8.

== Deaths ==
- January 6 - Ron Asheton, formed the Stooges with Iggy Pop, at age 60
- February 17 - Brad Van Pelt, Michigan State linebacker (1970–72), Maxwell Award (1972), at age 57
- March 6 - Colleen Howe, sports agent and wife of Gordie Howe, at age 76
- March 6 - Ed McMahon, The Tonight Show and Detroit native, at age 86
- March 13 Bill Davidson, CEO of Guardian Industries, owner of Detrioit Pistons, at age 86
- March 23 - George Kell, Baseball Hall of Fame third baseman (1943–57), Tigers broadcaster (1959–96), at age 86
- March 31 - Sidney Fine, historian, at age 88
- April 13 - Mark Fidrych, pitcher known as "The Bird", at age 53
- May 9 - Chuck Daly, Detroit Pistons coach (1983–92), at age 78
- May 28 - Terry Barr, UM and Detroit Lions halfback (1954–1965), at age 76
- July 5 - Lou Creekmur, Detroit Lions tackle (1950–59), Hall of Fame, at age 82
- July 6 - Robert McNamara, President of Ford, Secretary of Defense, at age 93
- August 6 - John Hughes, filmmaker born in Lansing, raised in Grosse Pointe, at age 59
- September 16 - Monte Clark, Detroit Lions coach (1978–84), at age 72
- October 16 - Bob Davis, Congressman (1979–1993), at age 77
- October 22 - Soupy Sales, comedian and TV host, local Detroit show (1953–60), at age 83
- October 28 - Dave Barclay, 1947 NCAA golf champion while at U-M, at age 89
- October 30 - Forest Evashevski, UM football player (1938–40), Iowa head coach (1952–60), at age 91
- November 4 - Lyman Parks, mayor of Grand Rapids (1971–1976), at age 92
- December 6 - Al Dorow, quarterback and coach, at age 80
- December 14 - Erma Henderson, first African American woman on the Detroit City Council, at age 92
- December 19 - Carl Pursell, US Congress (1977–1993), at age 76
- December 28 - J. David Singer, political scientist, at age 84
- December 29 - Dave Diles, sports broadcaster, journalist and author, at age 78

== See also ==
- 2009 in the United States
