= Government proposal =

Government proposal may refer to:

- A proposal submitted by the government of a country to its parliament, in other words a legislative or other proposal by a government, which can for example concern a proposed bill, a treaty, or the state budget
- A government contract proposal, a response to a request for proposals

== See also ==
- Proposal (disambiguation)
