= Proposal 2 =

Proposal 2 may refer to:

== Florida ==
- In 2008, Proposal 2 aimed to define the only legal union as a "marriage between one man and one woman."

== Michigan ==
- In 2004, Proposal 2 was Michigan State Proposal – 04-2 (2004), which aimed to define marriage as "the union of one man and one woman" in the state constitution
- In 2006, Proposal 2 was the Michigan Civil Rights Initiative, which banned affirmative action in public education
- In 2008, Proposal 2 was Michigan State Proposal – 08-2 (2008), a ballot initiative to allow stem cell research on embryos that would otherwise be discarded

== Scotland ==
- In 2010, Proposal 2 was part of the Referendum (Scotland) Bill, 2010, which outlined the option for full independence
