= Sexual proposition =

Sexual proposition may refer to:

- Flirting
- Seduction
- Sexual harassment
- Solicitation of prostitution

== See also ==
- Proposition (disambiguation)
