= The Proposal (1957 film) =

- Genre: comedy
- Based on: The Proposal by Anton Chekhov
- Directed by: Christopher Muir
- Country of origin: Australia
- Original language: English

Production
- Production company: ABC
- Budget: nearly £400

Original release
- Network: ABV-2
- Release: 25 February 1957 (Melbourne, live)
- Release: 14 March 1957 (Sydney)

The Proposal is a 1957 Australian television play based on the play A Marriage Proposal by Anton Chekhov. It was made at a time when Australian drama production was rare and mostly adaptations of overseas shows.

== Plot ==
In the 1880s a suitor tries to propose to an attractive girl under the eye of her father. The suitor keeps saying the wrong thing.

== Cast ==
- Paul Bacon as the suitor
- Douglas Kelly as the father
- Bettine Kauffmann as the girl

== Production ==
It was filmed in Melbourne using popular radio actors of the time.

Chris Muir recalled the air-conditioning broke down in the studio and the actors came close to fainting.

== See also ==
- List of live television plays broadcast on Australian Broadcasting Corporation (1950s)
