= A Marriage Proposal =

1889 play by Anton Chekhov

- Written by: Anton Chekhov
- Original language: Russian
- Genre: One-act farce

Premiere
- Date premiered: 1890

A Marriage Proposal (sometimes translated as simply The Proposal, Russian: Предложение, romanized: Predlozheniye) is a one-act farce by Anton Chekhov, written in 1888–1889 and first performed in 1890. It is a fast-paced play of dialogue-based action and situational humour. A young man Lomov comes to propose to his neighbour Natalya but they keep on fighting over various topics.

== Plot synopsis ==
Ivan Vassilevitch Lomov, a long-time neighbour of Stepan Stepanovitch Chubukov, has come to propose marriage to Chubukov's 25-year-old daughter, Natalya Stepanovna. After he has asked and received joyful permission to marry Natalya, she is invited into the room, and he tries to convey to her the proposal. Lomov is a hypochondriac (worry about illness, palpitations in this case), and, while trying to make clear his reasons for being there, he gets into an argument with Natalia about The Oxen Meadows, a disputed piece of land between their respective properties, which results in him having "palpitations" and numbness in his leg. After her father noticed they were arguing, he joins in, and then sends Ivan out of the house. While Stepan rants about Lomov, he expresses his shock that "this fool dares to make you (Natalya) a proposal of marriage!" Natalya then realizes that Lomov wanted to marry her and immediately starts into hysterics (ungovernable emotional excess), begging for her father to bring him back. He does, and Natalia and Ivan get into a second big argument, this time about the superiority of their respective hunting dogs, Guess and Squeezer. Ivan collapses from his exhaustion over arguing, and father and daughter fear he's dead, sending them into another round of hysterics. However, after a few minutes he regains consciousness, and Chubukov all but forces him and his daughter to accept the proposal with a kiss. Immediately following the kiss, the couple gets into another argument over their dogs while Chubukov tries to calm them and offers champagne.

== Performance history ==
The Proposal was successful in its first runs in St. Petersburg and Moscow, and quickly became popular in small towns across Russia. Tsar Alexander III liked the play when he had it performed for him. Chekhov himself thought farces were not really worth much as literature; before its success, he called The Proposal a "wretched, boring, vulgar little skit". He advised its director, Leontiev, to "roll cigarettes out of it for all I care".

When Vassar College staged The Proposal in the 1920s, they performed it three times in one evening, each with a very different staging: "as realism, expressionism, and constructivism". In the second version, played closer to tragedy, the actors were masked, and in the third the actors were all dressed in work suits in a playground, tossing a ball between them.

In 1935 in the Soviet Union, the seminal Russian theatre practitioner Vsevolod Meyerhold combined The Proposal with Chekhov's other short plays The Bear and The Anniversary to form a three-act play called 33 Swoons that demonstrated the weakness of the pre-revolutionary intelligentsia. In late June and early July, 2016, three performances of the play were performed at St. Werburgh's Church Parish Hall, Chorlton-cum-Hardy, Manchester, England.

It was adapted for Australian TV in 1957.

The 1972 Soviet slapstick film My God, Ilya! parodies the short play during is climax.

In 1976, an Indonesian movie director/ writer made an adaptation titled "Pinangan", which was cast by Benyamin Sueb, a comedian, and Rima Melati, a young actress.

In 2021, a new adaptation by Alan Stockdill, set in Yorkshire, England: ‘The Cow Fields of Slack Bottom’ was toured by Talking Stock Productions along with a sequel: ‘Trouble at Upper Thong’. Both plays were also performed by the Bishopteighnton Players in Devon,England.
