= Proposal Rock =

Proposal Rock may refer to:

- Proposal Rock (Montana), a rock pillar in Beaverhead County, Montana, United States
- Proposal Rock (Oregon), an island off the coast of Oregon near the city of Neskowin in the United States
- Proposal Rocks, a rock formation in Storrs, Connecticut, United States
