= Kilpatrick-Beatty criminal trial =

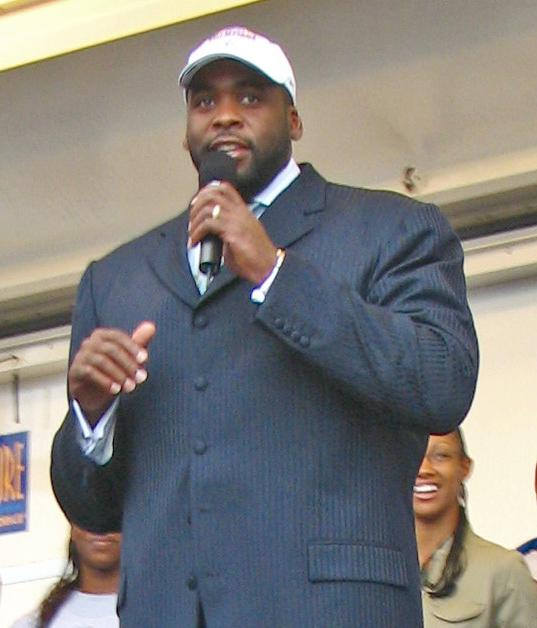
Kwame Kilpatrick

On March 24, 2008, Wayne County, Michigan Prosecutor Kym Worthy announced a 12-count criminal indictment against Detroit Mayor Kwame Kilpatrick and his former Chief of Staff and paramour Christine Beatty. Kilpatrick was charged with eight felonies and Beatty with seven. Charges for both included perjury, misconduct in office and obstruction of justice. Worthy also suggested that others in the Kilpatrick administration could also be charged.

On December 1, 2008, Beatty admitted lying under oath and was sentenced to 120 days in jail. She began serving the sentence on January 5, 2009.

== Text-messaging scandal ==
The charges stem from a political-sex scandal emerging from a sexual relationship between Detroit Mayor Kilpatrick and his chief of staff Christine Beatty. The revelation of this extra-marital affair was confirmed in text messages exchanged between Kilpatrick and Beatty. The text messages appear to contradict testimony that Kilpatrick and Beatty gave at a trial in 2007 in regards to whether they had an affair and had fired an officer for investigating the mayor's behavior. The City of Detroit settled the lawsuit for $8.4 million based on the recommendation of Kilpatrick and the City of Detroit law department.

The news led to Beatty resigning in February 2008 and political leaders and citizens calling for Kilpatrick to resign.

== Criminal charges ==
- Count 1: Conspiracy to obstruct justice (5-year maximum sentence)
- Count 2: Obstruction of justice. Accused of firing Detroit Deputy Police Chief Gary Brown as part of an effort to illegally hamper a criminal investigation and committing perjury to hide the firing of Brown or a relationship between the mayor and Beatty. (5-year maximum sentence)
- Count 3: Misconduct in office. Accused of firing Brown to hamper a criminal probe of Kilpatrick's personal conduct or the conduct of his security unit and committing perjury to hide the firing. (5-year maximum sentence)
- Count 4: Misconduct in office. Accused of authorizing the city to settle a whistle-blowers' lawsuit with the motive of preventing the release of text messages showing the mayor and his aide lied under oath. (5-year maximum sentence)
- Count 5: Perjury in court. Accused of lying under oath in August 2007 by saying he did not fire Brown, did not know Brown was investigating him or a rumored party at the mayor's official residence and testifying falsely as to other circumstances surrounding the termination of Brown. (15-year maximum sentence)
- Count 6: Perjury in court. Accused of falsely testifying in August 2007 that he didn't have a romantic or sexual relationship with Beatty. (15-year maximum sentence)
- Count 7: Perjury outside of court. Accused of swearing falsely before a notary public in June 2003 as to the circumstances surrounding the "un-appointment" of Brown. (15-year maximum sentence)

Kilpatrick was charged with a separate eighth count

- Count 8: Perjury outside court. Accused of swearing falsely before a notary public in October 2004 as to the circumstances surrounding the "un-appointment" of Brown. (15-year maximum sentence)

== Legal defense fund ==
To help offset the cost of Kilpatrick's criminal defense team, a fund was set up to raise money. According to Kilpatrick legal team spokesman Christopher Garrett, the fund's membership committee included former mayor of San Francisco, Willie Brown; Detroit native and television personality Judge Greg Mathis; Malik Zulu Shabazz, the leader of the New Black Panthers in Detroit; and S. Martin Taylor, a former DTE executive and a University of Michigan regent. However, within 24 hours Greg Mathis had contacted the media to state that the reports of his support for Kilpatrick were not true. Mathis stated: "I was contacted Wednesday afternoon [March 26, 2008] by Mayor Kilpatrick. He asked if I could serve on his legal defense committee. I informed him I support due process, but I could not support him. This [false statement of Mathis' support] is the same type of deceit that has plunged our city into a deep crisis... Not only do I not support him, but I recommend he resign so the city can heal and move forward."
