= Film industry in Michigan =

Overview of the film industry in the U.S. state of Michigan

The official history of motion picture production in the U.S. state of Michigan dates back to the beginning of the Post–World War II baby boom. As of March 14, 2013, the Michigan Film Office website contains a list of 319, filmed in Michigan titles, beginning with This Time for Keeps, starring Esther Williams and (Jimmy Durante) in 1946, followed by Anatomy of a Murder, starring Jimmy Stewart and Lee Remick in 1959. Contemporary nationally known works filmed in the state include the drama Conviction (2010), starring Hilary Swank and Sam Rockwell, Kill the Irishman (2011), starring Val Kilmer and Christopher Walken, HBO's series Hung was filmed, and is set in, Detroit, and the Discovery Channel's Motor City Motors (2009), formerly Monster Garage (2002-2006). Originally slated for Minneapolis, Minnesota, Clint Eastwood's film Gran Torino (2008) was filmed in the Detroit area.

Changes to the dynamics of the automotive industry left Michigan with vacant factories and commercial buildings, these buildings were well suited to be repurposed as sound stages and film production facilities. In 2008, Michigan offered nationally competitive film incentives that coincided with the automotive industry crisis. The Michigan Film Incentive effort was successful in creating a film production infrastructure and workforce, however the film incentive was scaled back and capped at $25 million per year by incoming Governor, Rick Snyder in 2012. Negotiations between industry and the legislature resulted in a $50 million budget for the film incentive in 2012. The Governor's Recommendation for FY 2013–14, caps the film incentive budget at $25 million.

Studio benefactors of the Michigan Film Incentive included: Raleigh Michigan Studios (Now known as Michigan Motion Picture Studios in Pontiac), Detroit Center Studios/Wonderstruck (in Detroit), 10 West Studios (in Manistee) and now defunct Unity Studios (Allen Park).

== The Michigan Film Office ==
The Michigan Film Office is overseen by the Michigan Economic Development Corporation and is a benefactor of the Michigan Strategic Fund. Formerly, an office consisting of one employee, under the umbrella of the History, Arts, and Libraries, staffing levels grew to six employees after film incentives were introduced in 2008. Michelle Begnoche, Public Relations Manager of the Michigan Film Office explains the goal of the film incentive: "The goal of the incentive is not to incentivize the movies that will make the most money; the goal of the film incentive is to incent those movies who will spend the most money in Michigan. So we are not looking at whether or not they get their money back. We are looking at how much are they going to spend on Michigan workers making that movie and how much are they going to spend in Michigan hotels and in the local areas while making that movie."

The Michigan Film Office was created in 1979 to assist and attract incoming production companies and to promote the growth of our indigenous industry. It provides several services, such as location photographs; help with location procurement and clearance; liaison with local/county/state government; contacts with business, institutions, neighborhoods, and other groups; production information, and location assistance.

— Michigan Economic Development Corporation

An organization known as the Michigan Production Alliance was formed as a 501c6 trade group in order to assist film community members with information, education and legislation with regard to the production industry in Michigan. The organization sent representatives to each legislative and non-political meeting as the initial film incentives were being developed and assisted in helping both legislators and the general population understand why incentives are like economic development driving diversification for the state's economy.

=== Regional film offices ===
- Ann Arbor Area Film Office
- Film Detroit
- Macomb County Film
- Oakland County Film
- West Michigan Film Office

=== The Michigan Film and Digital Media Incentive ===
The Michigan Film and Digital Media Incentive was signed into law on April 7, 2008, by Governor Jennifer M. Granholm(D). The legislation included Public Acts 74 through 87 of 2008. Introduced for the purpose of workforce and infrastructure development, a refundable or transferable tax incentive focuses on film, television and digital media production in the state of Michigan. The pre-2012 enactment of the film incentive, included a 40-percent subsidy for covered personnel expenditures, with an additional two-percent available for projects produced in Michigan's 103 core communities. Above the line personnel, directors, writers, producers etc., were eligible for a 40% credit on salaries regardless of Michigan residency. Below the line personnel, film industry craftsmen, technicians and engineers received a 40% credit if they were Michigan residents, or 30% for nonresidents. Capped at $20 million annually, the construction industry also benefited with a 25-percent subsidy for capital improvements, on the creation of new film-industry related facilities. The workforce development incentive also provided a Film and Digital Media Job Training Tax Credit, of 50-percent, for on-the-job training expenses of Michigan residents.

Of the 35 states that provide film industry incentives, 13 were considered competitive in 2008, Michigan became one of the top 3 competitors with New Mexico and Louisiana in this group. In 2008, Michigan film industry expenditures grossed $125 million, up from $2 million in 2007, creating an estimated 2800 jobs with incentive outlays of $47,992,000.00.

==== Film industry statistics ====
The 2007 Census reports that Michigan's participation in the North American Industry Classification System (NAICS) group, 512110 Motion picture and video production, had 923 employees participating in total salaries of $38.5 million annually ($41,767.00 average); the national employment pool, consisted of 142,620 employees, and generated salaries of $11.9 billion ($83,438.50 average) in the same year. Total industry revenues for, NAICS 512110 Motion picture and video production, was valued at $59.9 billion in 2007. It must be kept in mind however that freelance or Seasonal employees who make up the film industry workforce are NOT counted in the NAICS audits because they do not work for a specific company and often work for several during a given year. This makes it hard to quantify the film industry labor force.

==== Four-year overview ====
Since the incentives took effect in 2008, the Film Office and the Department of Treasury have approved a total of $392,384,844 in film incentives on $1,003,835,842 in total qualified expenditures by productions in Michigan. This represents 229 projects that have been approved to date, including 164 projects that have actually wrapped the state.

—Michigan Film Office 2011 Annual Report -- March 1, 2012

==== Public Act 291 of 2011 ====
In March 2011, Governor Rick Snyder(R) announced plans to put a $25 million cap on the Michigan Film Incentive, which at 42%, was one of the most aggressive film incentives in the United States. CNN reported that agreements signed prior to the cap proposal would be honored and that there were 43 pending applications on file at the Michigan Film Office. John E. Nixon, CPA and Michigan Department of Technology, Management, and Budget claimed that the Governor was not opposed to efforts to attract the film industry but was concerned about uncapped and unfunded expenditures. "Nixon says that every dollar spent brings in only 28 cents, not enough to justify such a high tax incentive."

Public Act 291 of 2011 (Section 125.2029h), was signed into Michigan law, effective immediately, on December 21, 2011. The new law honored existing production approvals with the following conditions stated in the Michigan Film Office 2011 Annual Report. Pre-production must begin within 90 days of approval, projects must have a signed agreement to participate, and funds spent prior to obtaining a signed agreement do not qualify; additionally, budget increases must be approved by the Film Office and the Treasury to qualify for the incentive. An audit with an independent Michigan CPA is required to obtain a post-production certificate, which is then submitted with the production's Michigan Business Tax return. Eligible projects are motion pictures, documentaries, television series, miniseries, interactive television, music videos, interactive games, video games, Internet programming, sound recording, digital animation and interactive websites. Criteria for incentive approval are listed as follows:

1. The production is financially viable.
2. Utilization of existing infrastructure (studios, post-production facilities, equipment rental, etc.).
3. The number and wage levels of direct jobs for Michigan residents created by a production.
4. Ability to show Michigan in a positive light and promote the state as a tourist destination.
5. Magnitude of estimated expenditures in Michigan.

Act 291 did not provide separate funding for infrastructure and workforce development for 2012 and no business tax credits were claimed in these categories for 2011; in the Michigan Film Office 2011 report, the Office was unclear on any discretion regarding funding infrastructure and workforce development expenditures within the $25 million annual cap. paragraph 3, of Section 125.2029h, does not mention infrastructure and workforce development.

Section 125.2029h (13) The film and digital media production assistance program shall provide for all of the following:

(a) Funding shall be provided only to reimburse direct production expenditures, Michigan personnel expenditures, crew personnel expenditures, or qualified personnel expenditures.

(b) To be eligible to apply for funding, the eligible production company shall have direct production expenditures, Michigan personnel expenditures, or a combination of direct production expenditures and Michigan personnel expenditures, of $100,000.00 or more.

Act 291 also specifically disqualifies commercials, televised news, weather reports, financial reports, political and fund-raising events, employee training and productions containing obscene matter from the incentive.

Section 125.2029h(1)(d): For state certified qualified production expenditures after September 30, 2011, an agreement under this section shall provide for funding equal to the sum of the following:
Section-Topic	after September 30, 2011 and before January 1, 2013	after December 31, 2012 and before January 1, 2014	after September 30, 2011 and before January 1, 2015	after December 31, 2013 and before January 1, 2015	after December 31, 2014
(i) ...of direct production expenditures.	27% →				
(ii)(A),(B) Michigan personnel expenditures as follows:	32% →			—	27%
(iii)(A),(B),(C) Crew personnel expenditures as follows:	25%	20%	—	15%	10%
(iv) (A),(B) Qualified personnel expenditures as follows:	27% →			—	12%
(v) In addition to the expenditures described in subparagraphs (i), (ii), (iii), and (iv), 3% of direct production expenditures and Michigan personnel expenditures at a qualified facility or postproduction facility for a qualified production produced at the facility.
(e) Payments and compensation for all producers of a qualified production residing in this state shall not exceed 10% of the direct production expenditures and Michigan personnel expenditures for the qualified production.
(f) Payments and compensation for all producers of a qualified production who are not residents of this state shall not exceed 5% of the direct production expenditures and Michigan personnel expenditures for the qualified production.

Negotiations with the legislature provided $50 million for the film incentive in 2012. The Governor's Recommendation for FY 2013-14 (S.B. 194), reduces the film incentive from $50 million to $25 million.

===== Results of reduction in funding =====
In March 2011, the Michigan Film Office reported to CNN Money that 43 pending applications could not be addressed until the legislature reached a final decision. Michigan Movie Magazine's, Chris Aliapoulios said, "As these applications sit in limbo, the projects involved are seeking out new locations..."

In its 2011 publication, the Michigan Film Office reported that 24 of 85 project applications were approved, 15 of those projects wrapped in 2011, 2 remained in production and 7 were in pre-production and scheduled to shoot in 2012. Eight additional projects that began in 2010, 2011 expenditures for these projects are included in the 2011 report. Twenty-five projects spent an estimated $201,968,238 in Michigan and were awarded $75,650,154. These productions created 3350 jobs, or an equivalent of 766 full-time employment.

Michigan Film Office, quarterly reports
Period	Applications approved	Expenditures	Incentives	Hires	Full time equiv.
First quarter 2012	9	$58,978,340	$17,493,232	664	358
Second quarter 2012	4	$49,241,108	$14,485,108	712	212
Third quarter 2012	7	$3,998,713	$1,197,003	305	24
Quarterly reports began in fiscal year 2012

==== Film incentive controversy ====
Opposed to the Michigan Film Incentive was the Center for Public Policy, which claimed that employment growth was too modest for the amount of money the state was spending. Governor Snyder has stated, "One of the problems with the tax credit world is that you're picking winners and losers, and government is not really competent to do that."

Proponents of the film incentive cited a multiplier effect, whereby the simple act of money changing hands creates excise tax income, investment and consumer optimism. A commissioned report, authored by Ernst & Young, found that 2,631 film industry jobs had been created in 2009 and 3,860 jobs in 2010. Ernst & Young also found that economic activity was increased 6 to 1 for every incentive dollar spent.

Economist David Zin, states that the film incentives have had a positive impact on the private sector, but also interjects that five years of employment growth, projected by Michigan State University, would only replace 8.1% of the jobs lost in Michigan between May and June 2008. David Zin, closes his 34-page issue paper on film incentives with, "As with other types of incentives and credits, whether the relationship of costs to benefits is acceptable is a decision for individual policy-makers."

Alexander Martin, an economist, wrote to the Michigan House Tax Policy Committee Chair, Judson S. Gilbert II, warning the committee of a "race to the bottom" economic condition, concerning subsidies that are geared toward increasing market share. Martin describes a scenario where the film industry may induce states with film incentives to bid against each other for film production business. Additionally, individuals, corporations and municipalities may make investments in an industry that can disappear when another state raises their film incentive. As proof, he offered the situation where Allen Park was contemplating laying off its fire department largely because Unity Studios relocated to Detroit.
