= Motor City Motors =

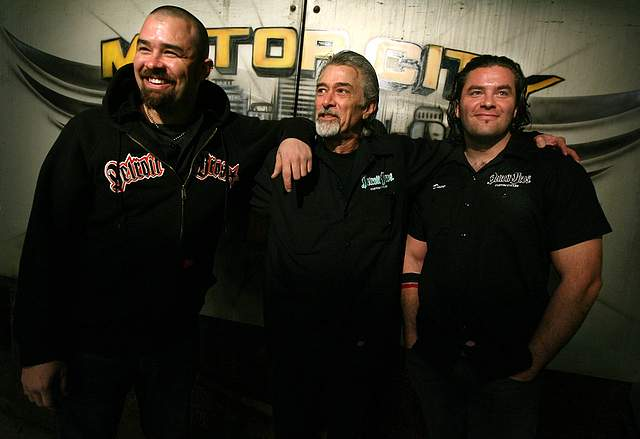
- Motor City Motors
- Created by: Thom Beers
- Starring: Dave, James and John Kaye (the Detroit Brothers)
- Country of origin: United States
- No. of seasons: 1
- No. of episodes: 13

Production
- Running time: 60 minutes (including commercials)

Original release
- Network: Discovery Channel
- Release: December 28, 2009 – April 6, 2010

Motor City Motors is a garage based competition reality television show on the Discovery Channel hosted by the Detroit Brothers. During development, the show was referred to as MG: Motor City, a successor to the similar Discovery show Monster Garage.

The first episode aired on Monday, December 28, 2009 at 9:00pm. The first season has thirteen episodes.

== Premise of the show ==
Teams of five or six builders are given five days to create a build conceived by the Detroit Brothers. If successful, each builder gets a tool package worth over $5,000.00.
