= 2008 Michigan Proposal 1 =

Referendum legalizing medical marijuana

Proposal 1
- A legislative initiative to permit the use and cultivation of marijuana for specified medical conditions.

Results
Choice	Votes	%
Yes	3,006,820	62.67%
No	1,790,889	37.33%
Total votes	4,797,709	100.00%
County results
Yes
70–80%
60–70%
50–60%

The Michigan Compassionate Care Initiative was an indirect initiated state statute that allowed the medical use of marijuana for seriously ill patients. It was approved by voters as Proposal 1 on November 6, 2008, 63 percent in favor to 37 percent opposed.

Specifically, the measure:

- Allows terminally and seriously ill patients to use marijuana with their doctors' approval.
- Permits qualifying patients or their caregivers to cultivate their own marijuana for their medical use, with limits on the amount they could possess.
- Creates identification cards for registered patients and establish penalties for false statements and fraudulent ID cards.
- Allows patients and their caregivers who are arrested to discuss their medical use in court.
- Maintains prohibitions on public use of marijuana and driving under the influence of marijuana.

== Supporters ==
The primary proponents of the initiative are the Michigan Coalition for Compassionate Care (MCCC). Former state representative Dianne Byrum (D) is chairwoman of the coalition.

== Organizations ==
- Marijuana Policy Project,
- National Organization for the Reform of Marijuana Laws (NORML)
- National Organization for the Reform of Marijuana Laws (NORML) - Michigan Chapter
- StoptheDrugWar.com

== Arguments in favor ==
- Prevents people from being threatened with prison for trying to relieve pain from a serious illness
- Some people are unable to take other drugs and marijuana is the only drug that alleviates a debilitating condition such as nausea or inability to eat.
- The law is narrow in scope as it deals only with medical marijuana
- Requires a doctor's certification of need to be covered under law
- There is a mandatory state registration system in place to assure the law is not abused.

Medical Access to Marijuana is supported by:

- American Academy of HIV Medicine
- American Bar Association
- American College of Physicians
- American Nurses Association
- American Public Health Association
- Aids Action Council
- Leukemia and Lymphoma Society
- Lymphoma Foundation of America
- National Association of People With Aids
- National Association of Attorneys General

In February 2008, delegates at the Michigan Democratic Party Convention unanimously passed a resolution in favor of protecting patients from arrest.

Michigan has already passed local medical marijuana initiatives in five cities—Ann Arbor, Detroit, Ferndale, Flint, and Traverse City—and by large margins.

A poll by Marketing Resource Group in March 2008 showed 67% of voters saying they supported medical marijuana and 62% voicing approval for this particular initiative. Voters between 34 and 54 showed 75% support for medical marijuana, with 63% of retirees voicing support. Younger voters (18 to 34) were the least supportive, with 61% backing the measure.

== State medical society takes neutral position ==
The Michigan State Medical Society took a neutral position on this ballot measure, as well as on two other initiatives related to health care at its annual delegates meeting in early May 2008.

== Status ==
The measure was presented to the Michigan State Legislature for passage on March 3, 2008, after supporters submitted sufficient signatures on petitions, but the legislature failed to act on the measure within the 40 days set by law, earning it a place on the November 2008 ballot as Question 1, where it was approved by voters.

=== Results ===
Michigan Coalition for Compassionate Care Initiative:
	Votes	Percentage
Yes	3,008,980	63%
No	1,792,870	37%
Total votes	4,801,850	100%
