= 2008 Michigan Proposal 2 =

Constitutional change on stem cell research

Proposal 2
- A proposal to amend the state constitution to address human embryo and human embryonic stem cell research in Michigan.

Results
Choice	Votes	%
Yes	2,521,026	52.61%
No	2,271,083	47.39%
Total votes	4,792,109	100.00%
County Results
Yes
60–70%
50–60%
No
60–70%
50–60%

Michigan Proposal 08-2 was a proposal to amend the Michigan Constitution to remove restrictions on stem cell research in Michigan while maintaining the ban on human cloning. Opponents argued that it would raise taxes. The proposal was passed on November 4, 2008, by voters by a 53–47% margin.

== Contents ==
The proposal appeared on the ballot as follows:

A proposal to amend the state constitution to address human embryo and human embryonic stem cell research in Michigan.

The proposed constitutional amendment would:

- Expand use of human embryos for any research permitted under federal law subject to the following limits: the embryos —
  - are created for fertility treatment purposes;
  - are not suitable for implantation or are in excess of clinical needs;
  - would be discarded unless used for research;
  - were donated by the person seeking fertility treatment.
- Provide that stem cells cannot be taken from human embryos more than 14 days after cell division begins.
- Prohibit any person from selling or purchasing human embryos for stem cell research.
- Prohibit state and local laws that prevent, restrict or discourage stem cell research, future therapies and cures.

== Support ==
In October, former President Bill Clinton came to Michigan to speak in favor of adopting Proposal 2. The Michigan State Medical Society took a neutral position on the ballot measure.

== Aftermath ==
In March 2009, TechTown announced the opening of a stem cell research lab in Detroit. However, the opening was delayed because TechTown had trouble getting funds and State Senator Thomas George attempted to the weaken the amendment with legislation he introduced.
