= 2004 in Michigan =

- Decades: 1980s; 1990s; 2000s; 2010s; 2020s
- See also: History of Michigan; Historical outline of Michigan; List of years in Michigan; 2004 in the United States

This article reviews 2004 in Michigan, including the state's office holders, largest public companies, performance of sports teams, a chronology of the state's top news and sports stories, and notable Michigan-related births and deaths.

== Top stories ==
The top stories in Michigan in 2004 included:

- 2004 Michigan elections, including John Kerry's narrow victory over George W. Bush for Michigan's electoral votes in the presidential election;
- 2004 Michigan Proposal 04-2, the Michigan Marriage Amendment, a constitutional amendment prohibiting the state from recognizing or performing same-sex marriages or civil unions, passing with 58.62% of the votes; and
- Trial and conviction of Nancy Seaman, a former elementary school teacher for the murder of her husband using a hatchet.

The state's top stories included:

- The 2003–04 Detroit Pistons winning the NBA championship in their first season under head coach Larry Brown;
- Malice at the Palace, a brawl between players for the Indiana Pacers and players and fans of the Detroit Pistons;
- The 2003–04 Detroit Red Wings winning the Presidents' Trophy for having the most points in the NHL, but losing to the Calgary Flames in the Western Conference Semifinals.

== Office holders ==
=== State office holders ===
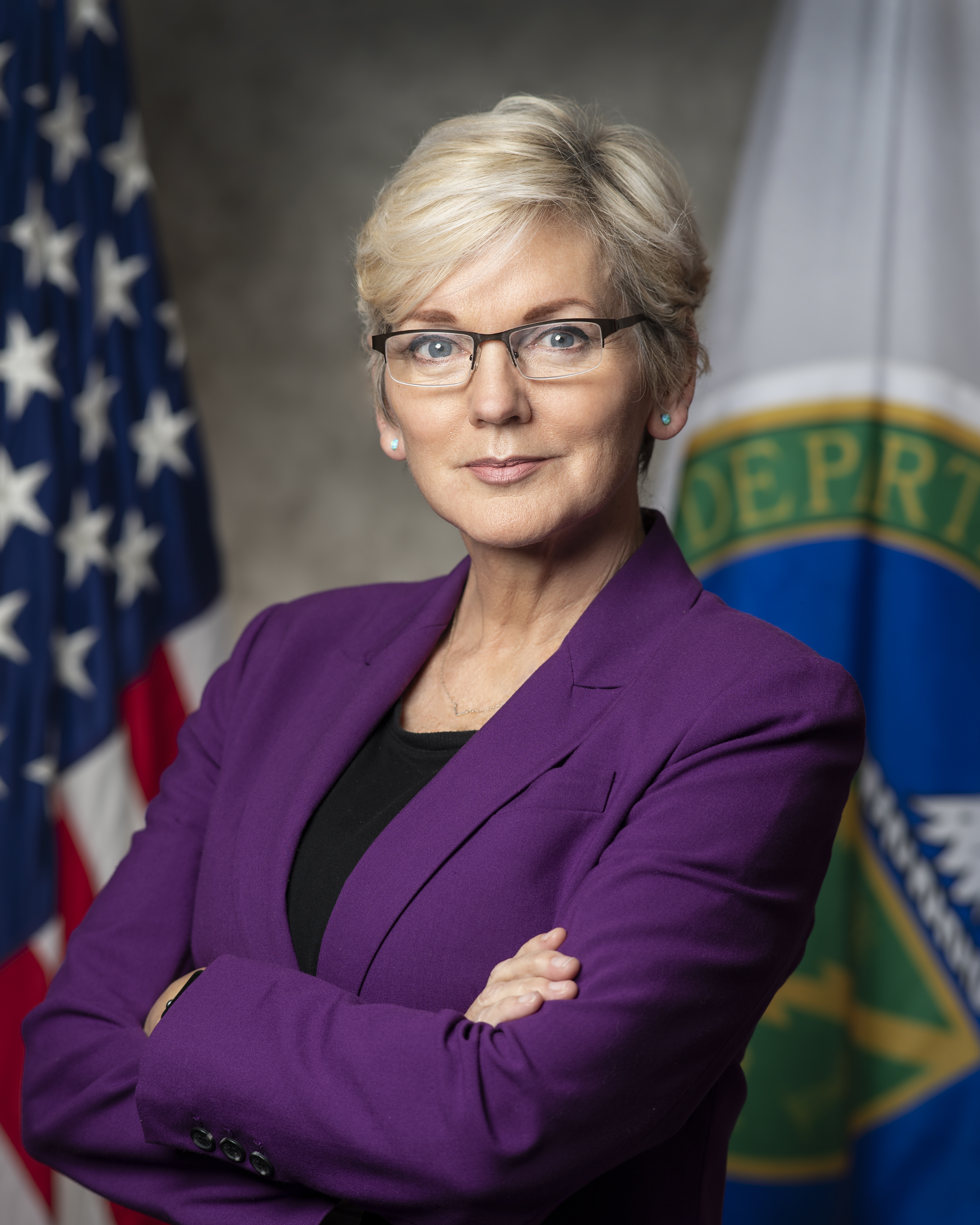
Jennifer Granholm

- Governor of Michigan - Jennifer Granholm (Democrat)
- Lieutenant Governor of Michigan: John D. Cherry (Democrat)
- Michigan Attorney General - Mike Cox (Republican)
- Michigan Secretary of State - Terri Lynn Land (Republican)
- Speaker of the Michigan House of Representatives: Rick Johnson (Republican)
- Majority Leader of the Michigan Senate: Ken Sikkema (Republican)
- Chief Justice, Michigan Supreme Court: Maura D. Corrigan

=== Federal office holders ===
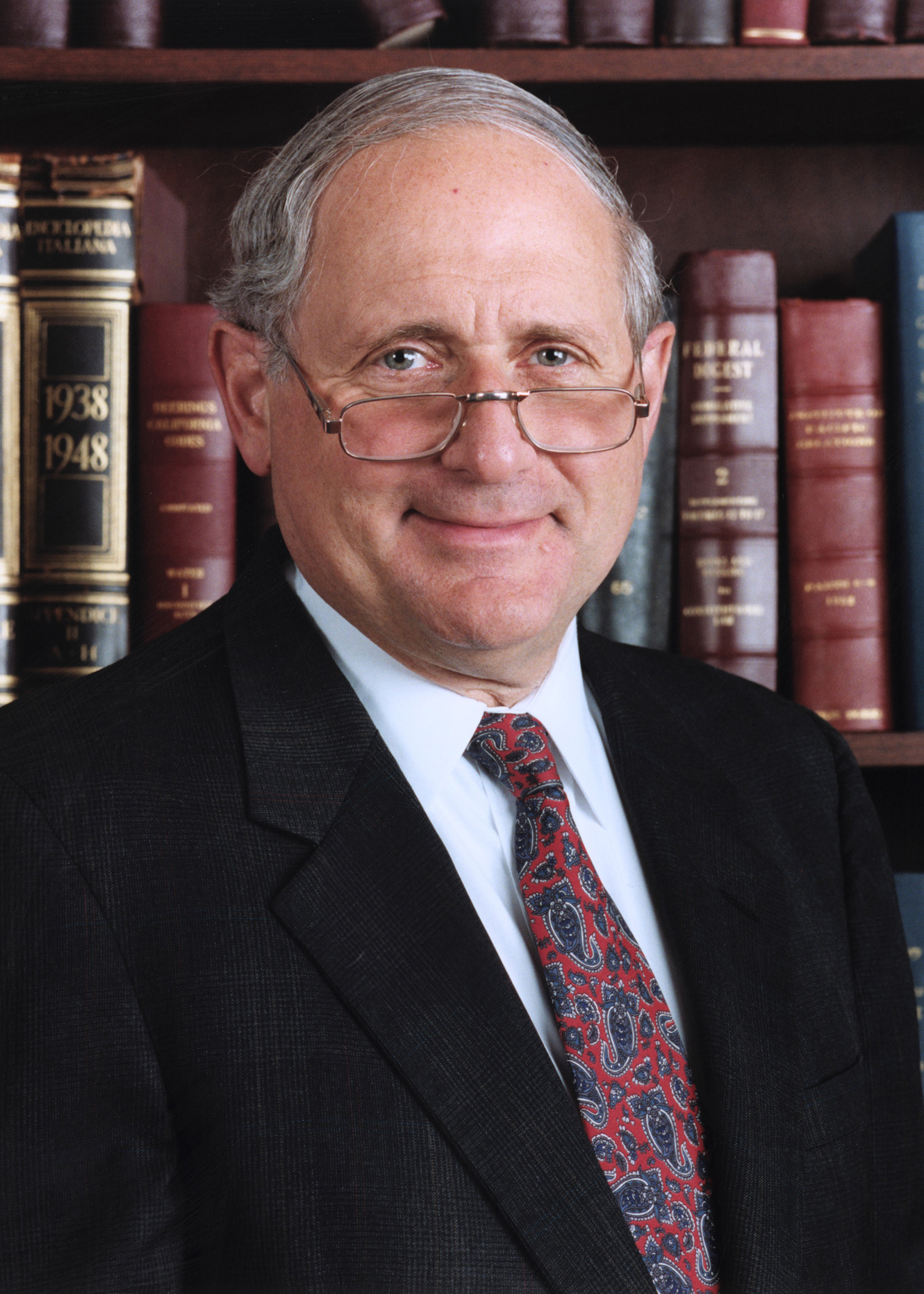
Carl Levin

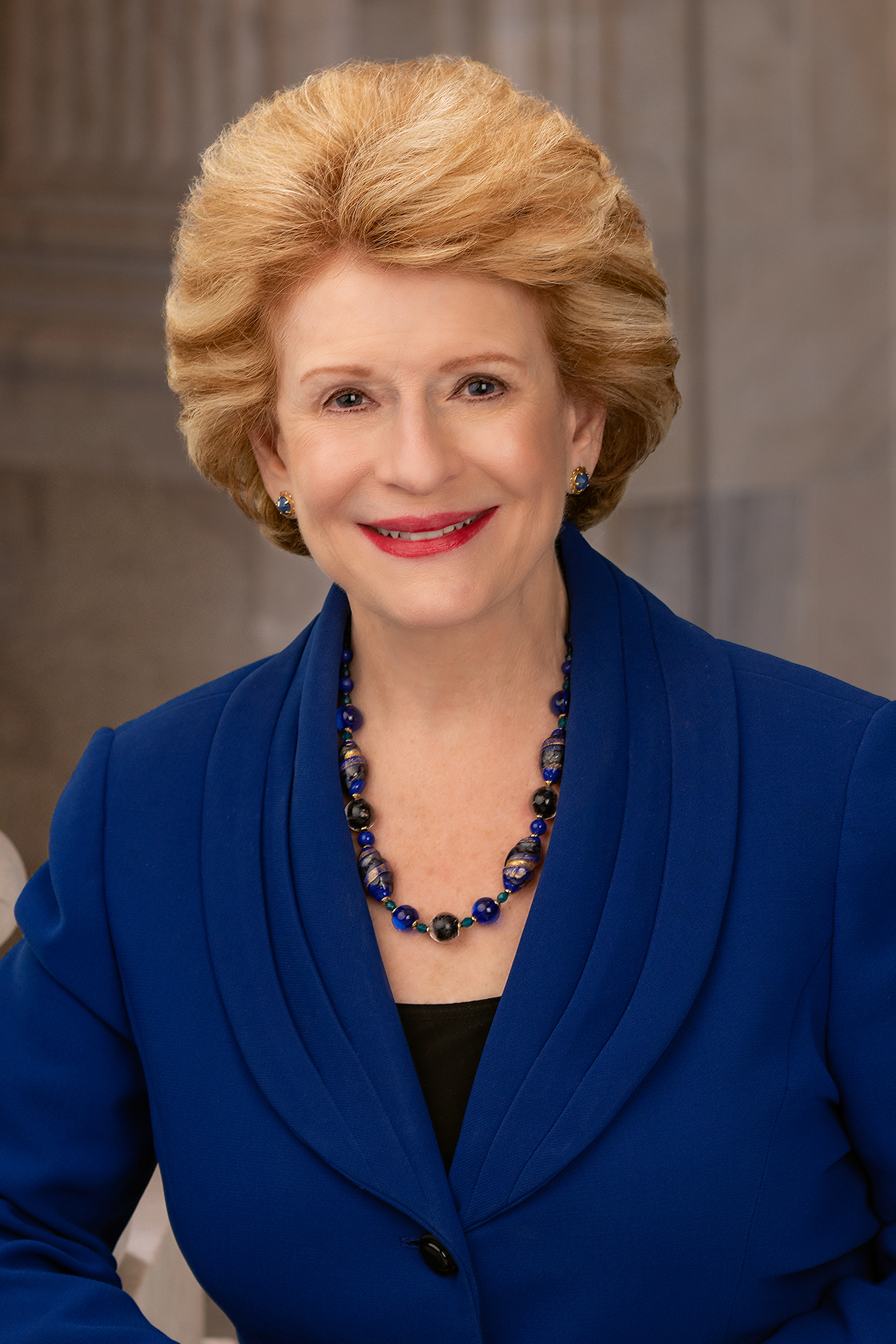
Debbie Stabenow

- U.S. senator from Michigan: Debbie Stabenow (Democrat)
- U.S. senator from Michigan: Carl Levin (Democrat)
- House District 1: Bart Stupak (Democrat)
- House District 2: Pete Hoekstra (Republican)
- House District 3: Vern Ehlers (Republican)
- House District 4: Dave Camp (Republican)
- House District 5: Dale Kildee (Democrat)
- House District 6: Fred Upton (Republican)
- House District 7: Nick Smith (Republican)
- House District 8: Mike Rogers (Republican)
- House District 9: Joe Knollenberg (Democrat)
- House District 10: David Bonior (Democrat)
- House District 11: Joe Knollenberg (Republican)
- House District 12: Sander Levin (Democrat)
- House District 13: Carolyn Cheeks Kilpatrick (Democrat)
- House District 14: John Conyers (Democrat)
- House District 15: John Dingell (Democrat)

=== Mayors of major cities ===
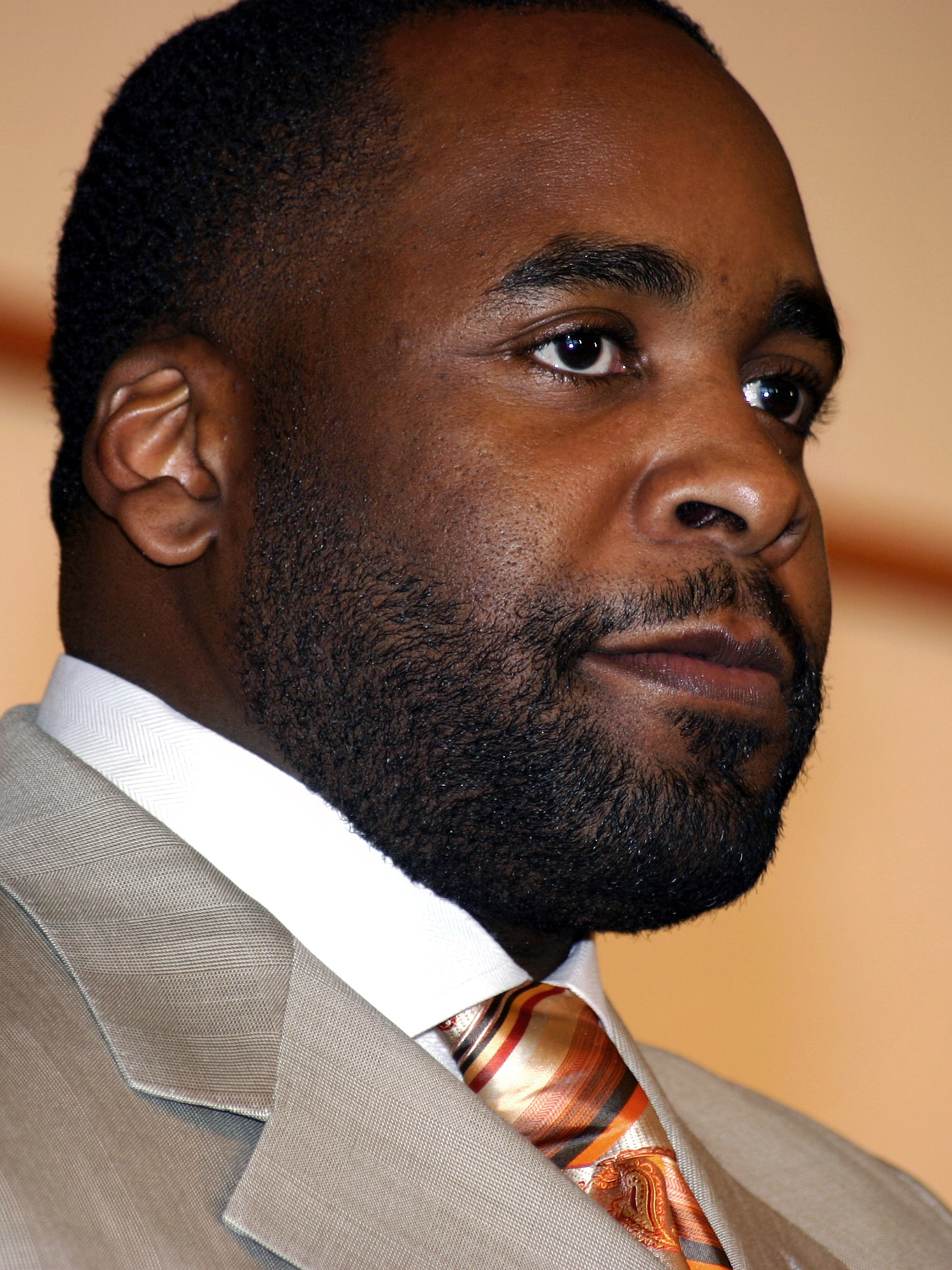
Kwame Kilpatrick

- Mayor of Detroit: Kwame Kilpatrick (Democrat)
- Mayor of Grand Rapids: George Heartwell
- Mayor of Ann Arbor: John Hieftje (Democrat)
- Mayor of Lansing: Antonio Benavides
- Mayor of Flint: Don Williamson
- Mayor of Saginaw: Wilmer Jones Ham

== Largest public companies ==
In April 2005, the Detroit Free Press published its annual "The Free Press 50" list of the largest Michigan-based public companies based on 2004 revenues. The top 30 companies are shown below.

Rank	Company	Headquarters	Business	2004 revenue (in millions)	Revenue change from 2003	2004 profit (in millions)	Profit change from 2003
1	General Motors	Detroit	Autos	$193,517	4.13%	$2,805	-26.61%
2	Ford	Dearborn	Autos	$171,652	4.45%	$3,487	604.44%
3	Dow Chemical Company	Midland	Chemicals	$40,161	23.07%	$2,797	61.68%
4	Delphi Automotive Systems	Troy	Auto supplier	$28,700	2.15%	n/a	--
5	Kmart	Troy	Retailer	$19,701	-15.28%	$1,106	--
6	Visteon	Dearborn	Auto supplier	$18,657	5.65%	-$1,499	-$24.19%
7	Lear Corporation	Southfield	Auto supplier	$16,960	7.71%	$422	10.96%
8	Whirlpool Corporation	Benton Harbor	Appliances	$13,220	8.57%	$406	-1.93%
9	Masco	Taylor	Building products	$12,074	14.22%	$893	10.79%
10	TRW Automotive	Livonia	Auto supplier	$12,011	5.81%	$29	--
11	PulteGroup	Bloomfield Hills	Home builders	$11,711	29.95%	$986	57.94%
12	United Auto Group	Detroit	Auto franchise operator	$9,886	17.84%	$111	34.68%
13	Kellogg's	Battle Creek	Food	$9,613	9.13%	$890	13.15%
14	ArvinMeritor	Troy	Auto supplier	$8,199	14.08%	-$43	-
15	DTE Energy	Detroit	Utility	$7,114	1.04%	$431	-17.27%
16	Federal-Mogul	Southfield	Auto supplier	$6,174	11.79%	-$334	-76.25%
17	CMS Energy	Dearborn	Utility	$5,472	-0.74%	$121	--
18	Kelly Services	Troy	Staffing	$4,984	15.23%	$22	333.07%
19	Stryker	Kalamazoo	Medical products	$4,262	17.57%	$465	2.69%
20	Collins & Aikman	Troy	Auto supplier	$3,956	-0.68%	n/a	--
21	Borders Group Inc.	Ann Arbor	Books, music, video	$3,903	4.61%	$132	10.67%
22	American Axle	Detroit	Auto supplier	$3.599	-2.26%	$159	-19.08%
23	BorgWarner	Auburn Hills	Auto supplier	$3,525	14.86%	218	24.81%
24	Comerica	Detroit	Financial services	$3,094	-6.21%	$757	14.52%
25	Tower Automotive	Grand Rapids	Auto supplier	$3,049	8.29%	n/a	-
26	Dura Automotive Systems	Rochester Hills	Auto supplier	$2,492	$4.69	-$11	-47.54%
27	Steelcase	Grand Rapids	Office furniture	$2,486	3.33%	-$6	--
28	Universal Forest Products	Grand Rapids	Lumber	$2,453	29.20%	$48	21.14%
29	Hayes Lemmerz International	Northville	Auto supplier	$2,232	8.54%	n/a	--
30	La-Z-Boy	Monroe	Home furniture	$2,062	3.38%	-$25	--

== Sports ==
=== Baseball ===
- 2004 Detroit Tigers season - In their second season under manager Alan Trammell, the Tigers compiled a 72–90 record. The team's statistical leaders included Iván Rodríguez (.334 batting average), Carlos Guillen (97 RBIs), and Carlos Peña (27 home runs).

=== American football ===
- 2004 Detroit Lions season - In their second year under head coach Steve Mariucci, the Lions compiled a 6–10 record. The team's statistical leaders included Joey Harrington (3,047 passing yards), Kevin Jones (1,133 rushing yards), Roy Williams (817 receiving yard), and Jason Hanson (100 points).
- 2004 Michigan Wolverines football team - In their tenth season under head coach Lloyd Carr,
- 2004 Michigan State Spartans football team

=== Basketball ===
- 2003–04 Detroit Pistons season - In their first season under head coach Larry Brown, the Pistons compiled a 54–28 record and won the NBA championship, defeating the Los Angeles Lakers in the 2004 NBA Finals. The team's statistical leaders included Richard Hamilton (1,375 points), Chauncey Billups (446 assists), and Ben Wallace (1,006 rebounds, including 324 offensive rebounds).
- Malice at the Palace - A fight that broke out on November 19 between players and fans during a game between the Pistons and Indiana Pacers. After being hit with a drink, Ron Artest charged into the crowd and grabbed a fan who Artest erroneously though threw the drink. Other players joined Artest in the crowd, and many drinks and punches were thrown. Five players and five fans faced criminal charges.
- 2004 Detroit Shock season - In their third year under head coach Bill Laimbeer, the Shock compiled a 17–17 record. The team's statistical leaders included Swin Cash (526 points, 135 assists) and Cheryl Ford (297 rebounds).
- 2003–04 Michigan State Spartans men's basketball team -
- 2003–04 Michigan Wolverines men's basketball team - In their third season under head coach Tommy Amaker, the Wolverines compiled a – record.

=== Ice hockey ===
- 2003–04 Detroit Red Wings season - In their second and final season under head coach Dave Lewis, the Wings compiled a 48–21–11–2 record, won the Presidents' Trophy, and lost to the Calgary Flames in the Western Conference Semifinals. The team's statistical leaders included Pavel Datsyuk (30 goals, 68 points) and Brett Hull (43 assists, 68 points).

=== Other ===
- 2004 Ryder Cup - at Oakland Hills
- 2004 DHL 400
- 2004 GFS Marketplace 400

== Chronology of events ==
=== January ===
- January 1 - Michigan lost to USC, 28–14, in the 2005 Rose Bowl.
- January 8 - The US Justice Department filed suit against John "Ivan" Kalymon, a retired Chrysler worker from Troy, alleging that he helped round up Jews in Poland in 1942 for placement into collection centers for deportation to concentration camps. The suit sought revocation of US citizenship that was granted to Kalymon in 1955.
- January 16 - Refirgerator maker Electrolux AB announced it would close its Greenville factor, resulting in the loss of 2,700 jobs, and move its manufacturing to a new $150-million plant in Mexico. Michigan had offered $182 million in tax credits, union concessions and a new building.
- January 22 - Ford Motor Co. reported a 2003 profit of $500 million, despite losing almost $800 million in the fourth quarter. It was Ford's first annual profit in three years.

=== February ===
- February 2 - Iván Rodríguez signed a $40-million contract with the Detroit Tigers.
- February 5 - Cardinal Adam Maida revealed that he believed that 63 priests and deacons sexually abused at least 116 minors in metropolitan Detroit since 1950.
- February 7 - 2004 Michigan Democratic presidential caucuses: John Kerry won the Michigan Democratic Caucus with 52% of the vote, well ahead of Howard Dean (17%), John Edwards (14%), Wesley Clark (7%), and Dennis Kucinich (3%).
- February 23 - Detroit's Monument to Joe Louis was vandalized with white paint. Two white men from the suburbs were charged with the crime. They admitted they did, but denied any racist motive. Rather, one of the men, Brett Cashman, said they "targeted the fist because of its violent imagery and the inappropriateness of a clenched fist as a prominent city symbol. ... In a sense, we wanted to unclench the fist. It was a political statement meant to convey one message: 'Stop the violence.'"

=== March ===
- March 3 - Detroit mayor Kwame Kilpatrick announced his plan to acquire Michigan Central Depot and convert it into headquarters for the Detroit Police Department.
- March 4 - Confessed Michigan serial killer Coral Eugene Watts was charged with the 1979 murder of The Detroit News food writer Jeanne Clyne.
- March 15 - Bob Seger was inducted into the Rock and Roll Hall of Fame. Gov. Jennifer Granholm declared it Bob Seger Day.
- March 20 - One year after the start of the Iraq, Michigan's tally of war dead was 21, most from smaller towns and most without college education.
- March 29 - Johnson Conrols Inc. announced plans to move almost 900 jobs from Holland to Mexico.
- March 31 - Berry Gordy sold his remaining interest in the Motown music catalogue of 15,000 compositions. EMI Music Publishing purchased Gordy's remaining interest for approximately $80 million.
- March 31 - Roger Thompson murdered his girlfriend and the woman's four children, ages 9, 12, 14 and 16 "after nearly 24 hours of torture in a run-down, boarded up bungalow in northeast Detroit." The 13-year-old sister of the man's girlfriend, who had been held in a closet for 31 hours, escaped and ran to a neighbor's house where police were called.

=== April ===
- April 1 - Detroit Public School announced the layoff of 3,200 workers, including 900 teachers.

=== November ===
- November 2 - election day in Michigan

- John Kerry won Michigan electoral votes, tallying 2,479,183 votes (51.23%), defeating incumbent George W. Bush who received 2,313,746 votes (47.81%).
- 2004 Michigan Proposal 04-2 - The Michigan Marriage Amendment made it unconstitutional for the state to recognize or perform same-sex marriages or civil unions. It passed with 2,698,077 votes (58.62%).
- 2004 United States House of Representatives elections in Michigan: The balance remained constant with nine Republicans and six Democrats representing Michigan in the House.
- 2004 Oakland County Executive election - Incumbent Republican L. Brooks Patterson won reelection with 81.05% of the votes.

== Births ==
- March 16 - Jaydin Blackwell, two-time Paralympic gold medalist sprinter, and six-time World Champion, in Oak Park
- August 31 - Kirsten Simms, named Most Outstanding Player at the 2025 NCAA Division I women's ice hockey tournament, in Plymouth

== Deaths ==
- January 27 - Jack Paar, talk show host, at age 85
- January 28 - Elroy Hirsch, football halfback and end, played for UM (1943–44), at age 80
- March 21 - Johnny Bristol, Motown songwriter and record producer, at age 65
- March 24 - Mildred Jeffrey, labor and women's rights activist, at age 93
- May 18 - Elvin Jones, jazz drummer, at age 76
- July 6 - Syreeta Wright, Motown singer-songwriter, at age 58
- July 18 - John D. Kraus, physicist and electrical engineer known for his contributions to electromagnetics, radio astronomy, and antenna theory, at age 94
- August 11 - Joe Falls, sports writer, at age 76
- August 14 - William D. Ford, US Congress (1965–1995), at age 77
- September 2 - Billy Davis, songwriter ("Lonely Teardrops", at age 72
- September 13 - Glenn Presnell, Detroit Lions halfback (1931–36), at age 99
- September 28 - Willis Hawkins, aeronautical engineer, at age 90
- October 20 - John A. Trese, Catholic priest, at age 81
- October 23 - Dorothy Comstock Riley, lawyer and judge, first Hispanic woman to serve on a state Supreme Court, at age 99
- December 7 - Jay Van Andel, billionaire who founded Amway, at age 80
- December 17 - Agnes Mary Mansour, Catholic nun ordered by Vatican in 1983 to end religious vows or resign as director of Michigan Department of Social Services, at age 73

== See also ==
- 2004 in the United States
