= 2005 in Michigan =

- Decades: 1980s; 1990s; 2000s; 2010s; 2020s
- See also: History of Michigan; Historical outline of Michigan; List of years in Michigan; 2005 in the United States

This article reviews 2005 in Michigan, including the state's major office holders, demographics, largest public companies, performance of its sports teams, cultural events, a chronology of the state's top news and sports stories, and notable Michigan-related births and deaths.

== Top stories ==
The top news stories in Michigan included:

- A decline in the American automobile business, including slowing demand, high costs, debt downgrades, layoffs, plant closures (including Lansing Car Assembly), and a bankruptcy filing by parts maker Delphi Corporation.
- Northwest Airlines filed for bankruptcy.

The state's top sports stories included:

- The 2004–05 Detroit Pistons season advancing to the NBA Finals for the second consecutive year, and Ben Wallace being named the NBA Defensive Player of the Year.
- The firing of the head coaches of all four Detroit professional team: Steve Mariucci from the Lions; Alan Trammell from the Tigers; Larry Brown from the Pistons; and Dave Lewis from the Red Wings.
- The 2004–05 Michigan State Spartans men's basketball team advancing to the Final Four and a riot in East Lansing following their loss.
- The 2005 Grand Valley State Lakers football team compiling a perfect 13–0 record and winning th NCAA Division II football championship.
- The 2005 Major League Baseball All-Star Game at Comerica Park in Detroit.

Notable Michigan-related deaths included civil rights legend Rosa Parks, automotive innovator John DeLorean, businessman Max Fisher. playwright Arthur Miller, and Four Tops vocalist Obie Benson.

== Office holders ==
=== State office holders ===
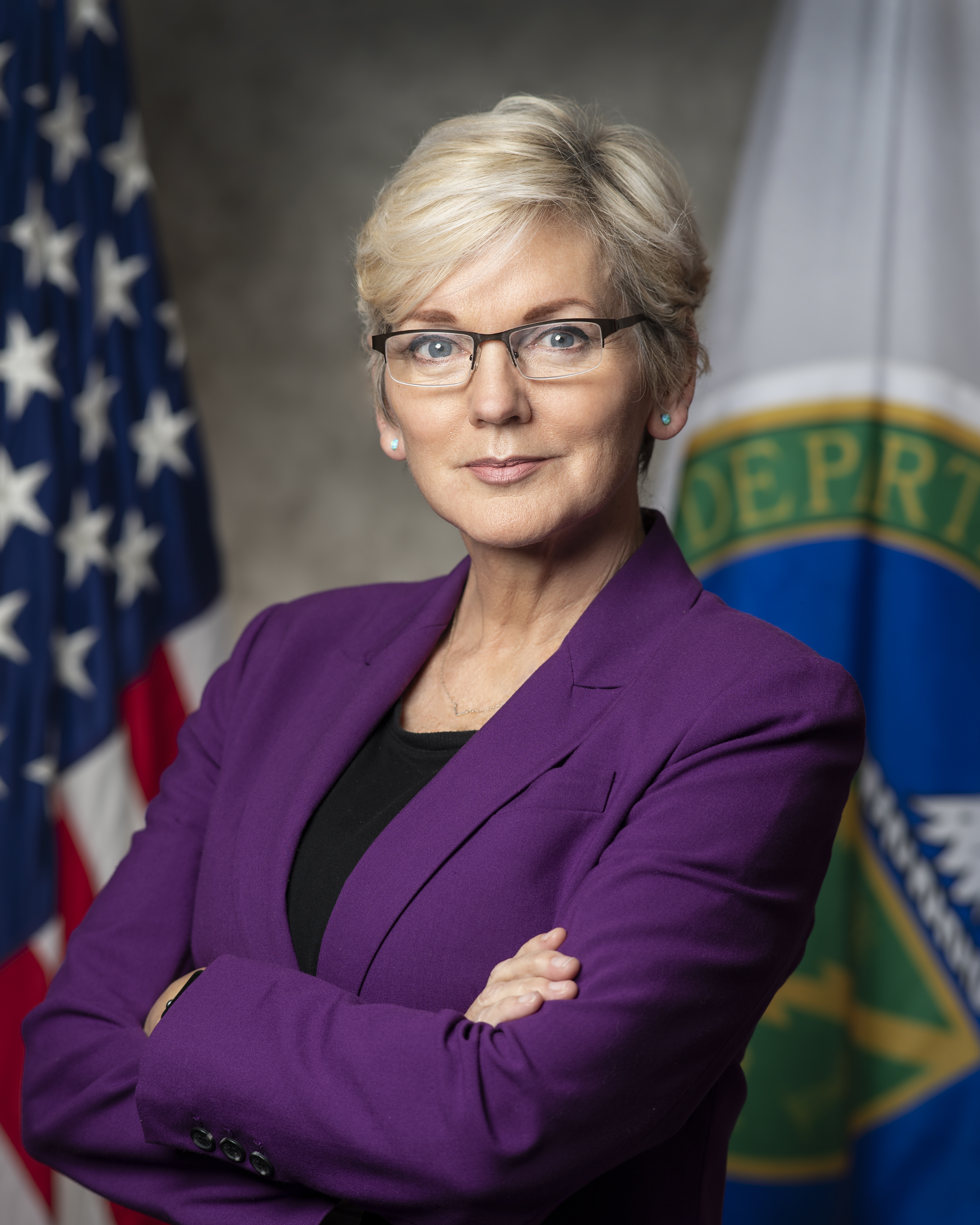
Jennifer Granholm

- Governor of Michigan - Jennifer Granholm (Democrat)
- Lieutenant Governor of Michigan: John D. Cherry (Democrat)
- Michigan Attorney General - Mike Cox (Republican)
- Michigan Secretary of State - Terri Lynn Land (Republican)
- Speaker of the Michigan House of Representatives: Craig DeRoche (Republican)
- Majority Leader of the Michigan Senate: Ken Sikkema (Republican)
- Chief Justice, Michigan Supreme Court: Clifford Taylor

=== Federal office holders ===
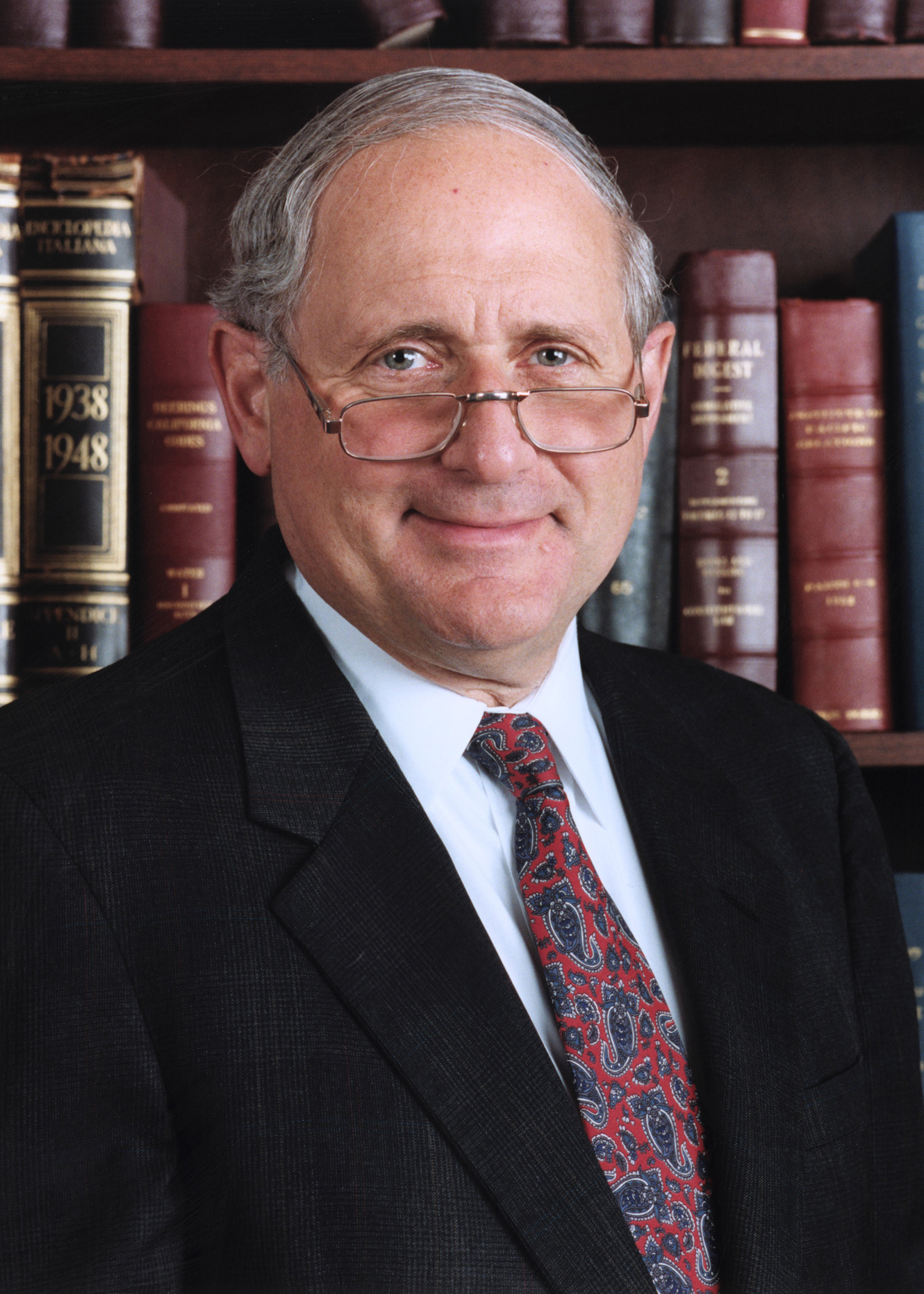
Carl Levin

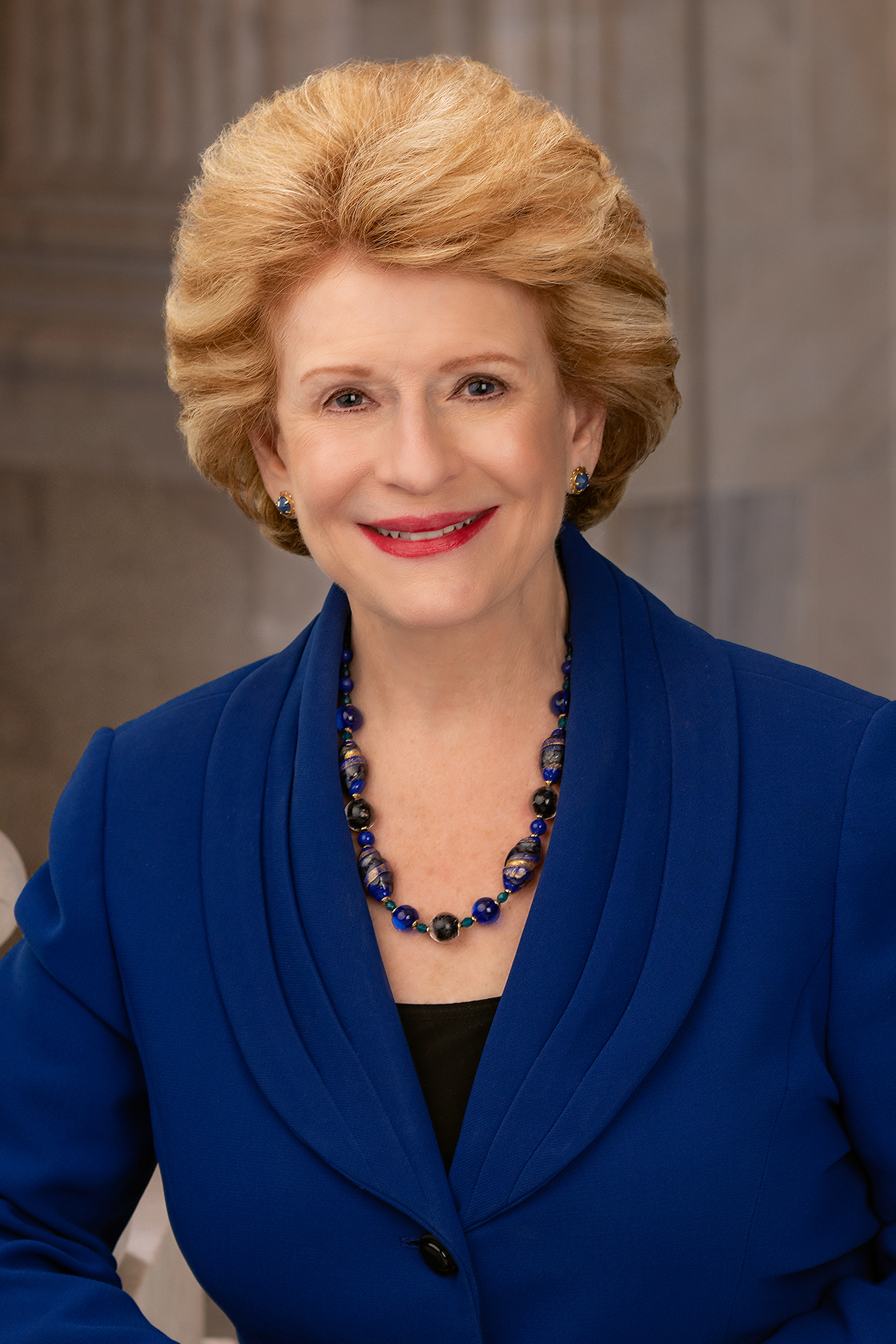
Debbie Stabenow

- U.S. Senator from Michigan: Debbie Stabenow (Democrat])
- U.S. Senator from Michigan: Carl Levin (Democrat)
- House District 1: Bart Stupak (Democrat)
- House District 2: Pete Hoekstra (Republican)
- House District 3: Vern Ehlers (Republican)
- House District 4: Dave Camp (Republican)
- House District 5: Dale Kildee (Democrat)
- House District 6: Fred Upton (Republican)
- House District 7: Joe Schwarz (Republican)
- House District 8: Mike Rogers (Republican)
- House District 9: Joe Knollenberg (Democrat)
- House District 10: David Bonior (Democrat)
- House District 11: Joe Knollenberg (Republican)
- House District 12: Sander Levin (Democrat)
- House District 13: Lynn N. Rivers (Democrat)
- House District 14: John Conyers (Democrat)
- House District 15: John Conyers (Democrat)

=== Mayors of major cities ===
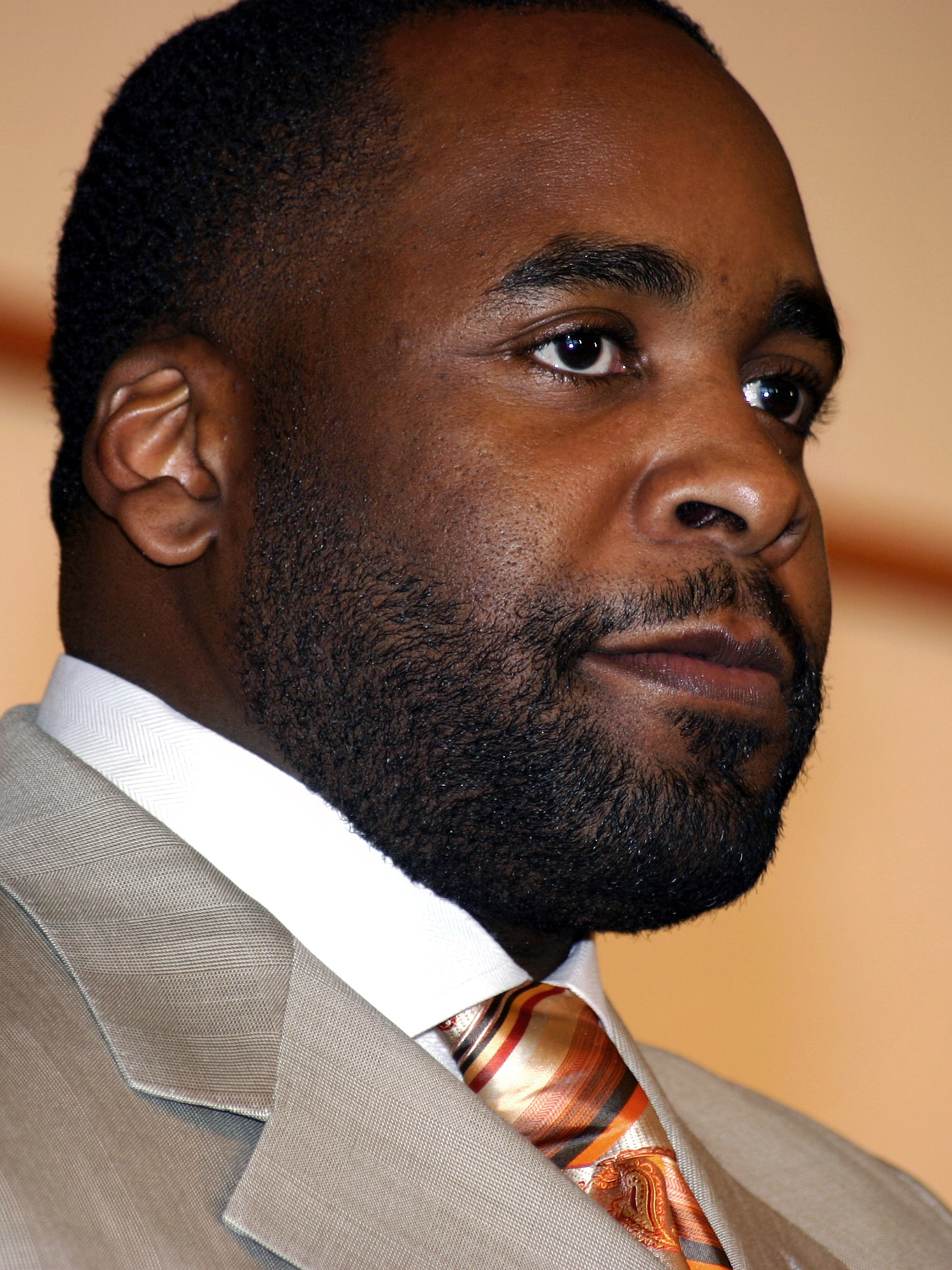
Kwame Kilpatrick

- Mayor of Detroit: Kwame Kilpatrick (Democrat)
- Mayor of Grand Rapids: George Heartwell
- Mayor of Ann Arbor: John Hieftje (Democrat)
- Mayor of Lansing: Antonio Benavides
- Mayor of Flint: Don Williamson
- Mayor of Saginaw: Wilmer Jones Ham

== Largest public companies ==
In June 2006, the Detroit Free Press releasted its annual "The Free Press 50" list of the largest Michigan-based public companies based on 2005 revenues. The top 25 companies are shown below.

Rank	Company	Headquarters	Business	2005 revenue (in billions)	2005 profit (in billions)	Change from 2004
1	General Motors	Detroit	Autos	$192.6	−$10.6	from profit of $2.8 billion
2	Ford Motor Company	Dearborn	Autos	$177.1	$2.0	−43%
3	Dow Chemical Company	Midland	Chemicals	$46.3	$4.5	+61%
4	Delphi Corporation	Troy	Auto supplier	$26.9	−$2.8	+41%
5	Lear Corporation	Southfield	Auto supplier	$17.1	−$1.4	from profit of $422 million
6	Visteon Corp.	Van Buren Township	Auto supplier	$17.0	−$0.270	+82%
7	Pulte Homes	Bloomfield Hills	Home builders	$14.7	$1.5	+51%
8	Whirlpool Corporation	Benton Harbor	Appliances	$14.32	$.422	+4%
9	TRW Automotive	Livonia	Auto supplier	$12.6	$.204	+604%
10	Masco Corp.	Taylor	Building products	$12.6	$.940	5%
11	United Auto Group	Bloomfield Hills	Auto francise operator	$10.2	$.119	+6.5%
12	Kellogg Co.	Battle Creek	Food	$10.18	$.980	+10%
13	DTE Energy	Detroit	Utility	$9.02	$.537	+25%
14	ArvinMeritor Inc.	Troy	Auto supplier	$8.9	-$.028	from loss of $43 million
15	CMS Energy	Jackson	Utility	$6.29	-$.084	from $122 million
16	Federal-Mogul Corp.	Southfield	Auto supplier	$6.3	-.334	down slightly
17	Kelly Services	Troy	Temporary staffing	$5.3	$.039	+85%
18	Stryker Corporation	Kalamazoo	Medical devices	$4.87	$.675	+45%
19	BorgWarner	Auburn Hills	Auto supplier	$4.3	$.239	+10%
20	Borders Group	Ann Arbor	Books, music, video	$4.0	$.101	-23%
21	Comerica	Detroit	Financial services	$3.67	$861	+14%
22	Tower Automotive	Novi	Auto supplier	$3.4	-$309	
23	American Axle & Mfg	Detroit	Auto supplier	$3.4	$.056	+65%
24	Steelcase	Grand Rapids	Office furniture	$2.9	$.048	+285%
25	Universal Forest Products Inc.	Grand Rapids	Lumber	$2.69	$.067	+39%

Notable company in the second 25 included La-Z-Boy (No. 29), Herman Miller (No. 31), Domino's (No. 32), Compuware (No. 36), Wolverine World Wide (No. 38), ProQuest (No. 41), and Taubman Centers (No. 45). KMart was ranked No. 5 in 2004, but dropped off the list after being acquired by Sears.

== Sports ==
=== Baseball ===
- 2005 Detroit Tigers season - In their final season under manager Alan Trammell, the team compiled a 71–91 record (.438). The team's statistical leaders included Dmitri Young (21 home runs), Craig Monroe (89 RBIs), Placido Polanco (.338 batting average), and Jeremy Bonderman/Mike Maroth (14 wins).
- 2005 Major League Baseball All-Star Game - The game was played at Comerica Park in Detroit on July 12.
- 2005 Michigan Wolverines softball team - In their 21st season under Carol Hutchins, the Wolverines compiled a 65–7 record and won the national championship in the Women's College World Series.

=== American football ===
- 2005 Detroit Lions season - Under head coaches Steve Mariucci (fired on November 28) and Dick Jauron (last five games), the Lions compiled a 5–11 record. The team's statistical leaders were Joey Harrington (2,021 passing yards), Kevin Jones (864 rushing yards), and Roy Williams (687 receiving yards).
- 2005 Michigan Wolverines football team - In their 11th season under head coach Lloyd Carr, the Wolverines compiled a 7–5 record. The team's statistical leaders were Chad Henne (2,526 passing yards), Mike Hart (662 rushing yards), and Jason Avant (1,007 receiving yards). Avant was selected as the team's most valuable player.
- 2005 Michigan State Spartans football team - In their third season under John L. Smith, the Spartans compiled a 5–6 record. The team's statistical leaders included Drew Stanton (3,077 passing yards), Javon Ringer (817 rushing yards), and Jerramy Scott (722 receiving yards.
- 2005 Grand Valley State Lakers football team - In their second season under head coach Chuck Martin, the Lakers compiled a 13–0 record and won the Division II national championship.
- 2005 Saginaw Valley State Cardinals football team - In their seventh year under head coach Randy Awrey, the Cardinals compiled an 11–2 record. Their only two losses were to national champion Grand Valley State, once in the regular season and once in the playoffs.
- 2005 Central Michigan Chippewas football team - In their second season under head coach Brian Kelly, the Chippewas compiled a 6–5 record.
- 2005 Eastern Michigan Eagles football team - In their second season under head coach Jeff Genyk, the Eagles compiled a 4–7 record.
- 2005 Western Michigan Broncos football team - In their first season under head coach Bill Cubit, the Broncos compiled a 7–4 record.

=== Basketball ===
- 2004–05 Detroit Pistons season - Led by Larry Brown, the Pistons compiled a 54–28 and advanced to the NBA Finals where they lost to the San Antonio Spurs. The team's statistical leaders included Richard Hamilton (1,424 points), Ben Wallace (902 rebounds, 176 blocks), and Chauncey Billups (464 rebounds).
- 2005 Detroit Shock season - Led by coach Bill Laimbeer, the Shock compiled a 16–18 record.
- 2004–05 Michigan Wolverines men's basketball team - Led by Tommy Amaker, the team compiled a 13–18 record.
- 2004–05 Michigan State Spartans men's basketball team - In their tenth season under Tom Izzo, the Spartans compiled a 26–7 record and advanced to the Final Four where they lost to North Carolina. A riot in East Lansing followed after the loss to North Carolina.
- 2004–05 Eastern Michigan Eagles men's basketball team - The team compiled an 12–18 record.
- 2004–05 Michigan State Spartans women's basketball team - The Spartans compiled a 33–4 record, won the Big Ten championship, and were the NCAA Tournament runner up.
- 2004–05 Oakland Golden Grizzlies men's basketball team - In their 21st season under Greg Kampe, the Grizzlies compiled a 13–19 record.

=== Ice hockey ===
- 2004–05 Detroit Red Wings season - The season was canceled due to the 2004–05 NHL lockout.

=== Other ===
- 2005 GFS Marketplace 400
- 2005 Batman Begins 400

== Chronology of events ==
=== January ===
- January 1 - Michigan lost to Texas, 38-37, in the Rose Bowl.
- January 9 - General Motors announced it would shed 8,000 jobs in 2005.
- January 12 - A massive pileup on I-96, as 50 vehicles were involved in one wreck in foggy Ingham County, killing two and injuring 37.
- January 31 - President Bush hosts the Detroit Pistons at the White House.

=== February ===
- February 3 - Awrey Bakeries, a 98-year-old company based in Livonia, filed for bankruptcy.
- February 13 - General Motors announced it would pay $2 billion to terminate its relationship with Fiat.
- February 18 - The mother of Detroit Tigers pitcher Ugueth Urbina was rescued from kidnappers in Venezuela.

=== March ===
- March 9 - Ford announced that William Clay Ford was retiring from the board of directors after 57 years' service.
- March 15 - Cardinal Adam Maida announced the closing of 18 Catholic schools, including eight high schools: Holy Redeemer, East Catholic, St. Martin De Porres, Bishop Borgess, Trinity (formerly Bishop Gallagher), and Notre Dame in Harper Woods. After numerous prior closures, the latest moves left the city with 10% of the Catholic schools that once existed in the city.

=== April ===
- April 2 - Michigan State men's basketball team lost to North Carolina in the Final Four.
- April 5 - Michigan State women's basketball team lost to North Carolina in the national championship game.
- April 7 - Warren mayor Mark Steenbergh sparked controversy in his state of the city speech describing Warren as a "fortress" standing against crime pushing north from Detroit.

== Births ==
- February 13 - Jayci Simon, badminton player, in St. Johns
- February 23 - Trey Augustine, hockey goaltender, in South Lyon
- March 26 - Ella Anderson, actress, in Ypsilanti
- April 16 - Olivia Thomas, soccer player, in Grosse Pointe
- May 6 - Semaj Morgan, wide receiver, in West Bloomfield
- May 8 - Alina Morse, CEO of Zolli, in Wolverine Lake
- May 26 - CJ Carr, quarterback, in Saline
- June 2 - Israel Boatwright, soccer defender, in Grand Rapids
- June 22 - Bryson Kuzdzal, running back, in Grand Rapids
- July 12 - Issac Ryan Brown, actor, rapper, singer, in Detroit

== Deaths ==
- January 30 - Mary Beck, first woman on Detroit city council (1950-70), at age 96
- February 5 - Nate Clark, national football scoring leader in 1955, at age 71
- February 10 - Arthur Miller, playwright (All My Sons, Death of a Salesman, The Crucible) and UM graduate, age 89
- February 13 - Sixten Ehrling, director of Detroit Symphony Orchestra, at age 86
- March 3 - Max Fisher, businessman and philanthropist, at age 96
- March 11 - Arbelia Wood, possibly the oldest living person, at age 119
- March 16 - Dick Radatz, MLB relief pitcher, at age 67
- March 19 - John DeLorean, automotive innovator, designer and entrepreneur, known for the Pontiac GTO, Pontiac Firebird, and DMC DeLorean, at age 80
- March 25 - Harold Cruse, professor and author on African-American politics, at age 89
- March 26 - Allison Green, Michigan State Treasurer (1965-1978), at age 93
- April 19 - Malcolm Carron, Jesuit priest, educator, and civic leader, at age 87
- April 23 - Earl Wilson, Detroit Tigers pitcher (1966-70), at age 70
- May 16 - William Murphy, UM tennis coach (1948-69), at age 87
- June 6 - Dana Elcar, actor (Dark Shadows, MacGyver, at age 77
- June 17 - Ronald Winans, gospel singer and member of The Winans
- July 1 - Obie Benson, vocalist for the Four Tops, at age 69
- September 13 - Cecil Pryor, defensive end at UM (1967-69), at age 57
- October 3 - Alvin Wistert, UM tackle (1946-49), College Football Hall of Fame, at age 89
- October 21 - John Lesinski Jr., US Congress (1951-1965), at age 90
- October 25 - Rosa Parks, civil rights activist who in 1955 refused to give up her seat on a Montgomery, Alabama bus to a white man, at age 92
- November 15 - Roy Brooks, jazz drummer who also played musical saw and drums with vacuum tubes, at age 67
- December 1 - Mark Beltaire, columnist ("The Town Crier") appeared in Detroit Free Press for more than 35 years, at age 91
- December 23 - Emmett Leith, professor of electrical engineering and co-inventor of three-dimensional holography, at age 79

== See also ==
- 2005 in the United States
