= 2006 in Michigan =

- Decades: 1980s; 1990s; 2000s; 2010s; 2020s
- See also: History of Michigan; Historical outline of Michigan; List of years in Michigan; 2006 in the United States

This article reviews 2006 in Michigan, including the state's major office holders, demographics, largest public companies, performance of its sports teams, cultural events, a chronology of the state's top news and sports stories, and notable Michigan-related births and deaths.

== Top stories ==
The top Michigan news stories of 2006 included:

- Jennifer Granholm's reelection as governor, defeating Republican millionaire Dick DeVos by a margin of 56% to 42%;
- Michigan voters approved Proposal 2, a ballot proposal limiting university and government affirmative action programs;
- 50 troops from Michigan died in the Iraq War in 2006;
- The death of Gerald Ford;
- The trial and conviction of Mark Unger of Huntington Woods for murdering his wife Florence Unger;
- Seven-year old Maddie Trudel's battle with bone cancer ending with her death on November 26;
- The murder of a New Baltimore couple and a Flint man by parolee Patrick Selepak and his girlfriend Samantha Bachynski;
- The murder of Ricky Holland by foster-adoptive parents Tim and Lisa Holland of Jackson;
- The growth of deaths from fentanyl;
- The two-week search in May for Jimmy Hoffa's body at the Hidden Dreams Farm in Milford Township;
- Criminal charges for willful neglect against two Detroit 911 operators for smissing a young boy's calls as pranks after his mother collapsed and died;
- Detroit teachers strike lasting 16 days in August and September;
- The accidental swap of identification of two woman in an April 26 van wreck, one dead (Laura VanRyn), the other (Whitney Cerak) in hospital, with the VanRyn parents spending weeks praying bedside and reading to the woman they thought was their daughter, only to learn that their daughter was dead.

The top sports stories of 2006, as ranked by the Detroit Free Press, were:
1. The Detroit Tigers compiled a 95–67 record, won the American League penant, and lost to the St. Louis Cardinals in the 2006 World Series.
2. The death of Bo Schembechler on November 17, the eve of the Ohio State game.
3. The Michigan Wolverines compiled an 11–21 record in the regular season, losing to Ohio State with the teams ranked No. 1 and No. 2, and lost to USC in the 2007 Rose Bowl.
4. The July 3 retirement of Steve Yzerman after 22 seasons and three Stanley Cups.
5. Super Bowl XL was played at Ford Field in Detroit on February 5.
6. The Pistons and Red Wings both posted the best records in their leagues, but neither made it to the finals. The Pistons lost in the Eastern Conference finals to the Miami Heat, and the Red Wings lost in the first round to the Edmonton Oilers.
7. Ben Wallace declared free agency and signed a $60 million contract with the Chicago Bulls.
8. The Detroit Lions finished with the worst record in the NFL at 3–13.
9. The Detroit Shock won the WNBA title.
10. Tanith Belbin and Ben Agosto, who trained in Canton, won the silver medal in ice dancing, the first ice dancing medal for an American pair in 30 years.

Notable Michigan-related deaths in 2006 included Gerald Ford, Bo Schembechler, and Wilson Pickett.

== Office holders ==
=== State office holders ===
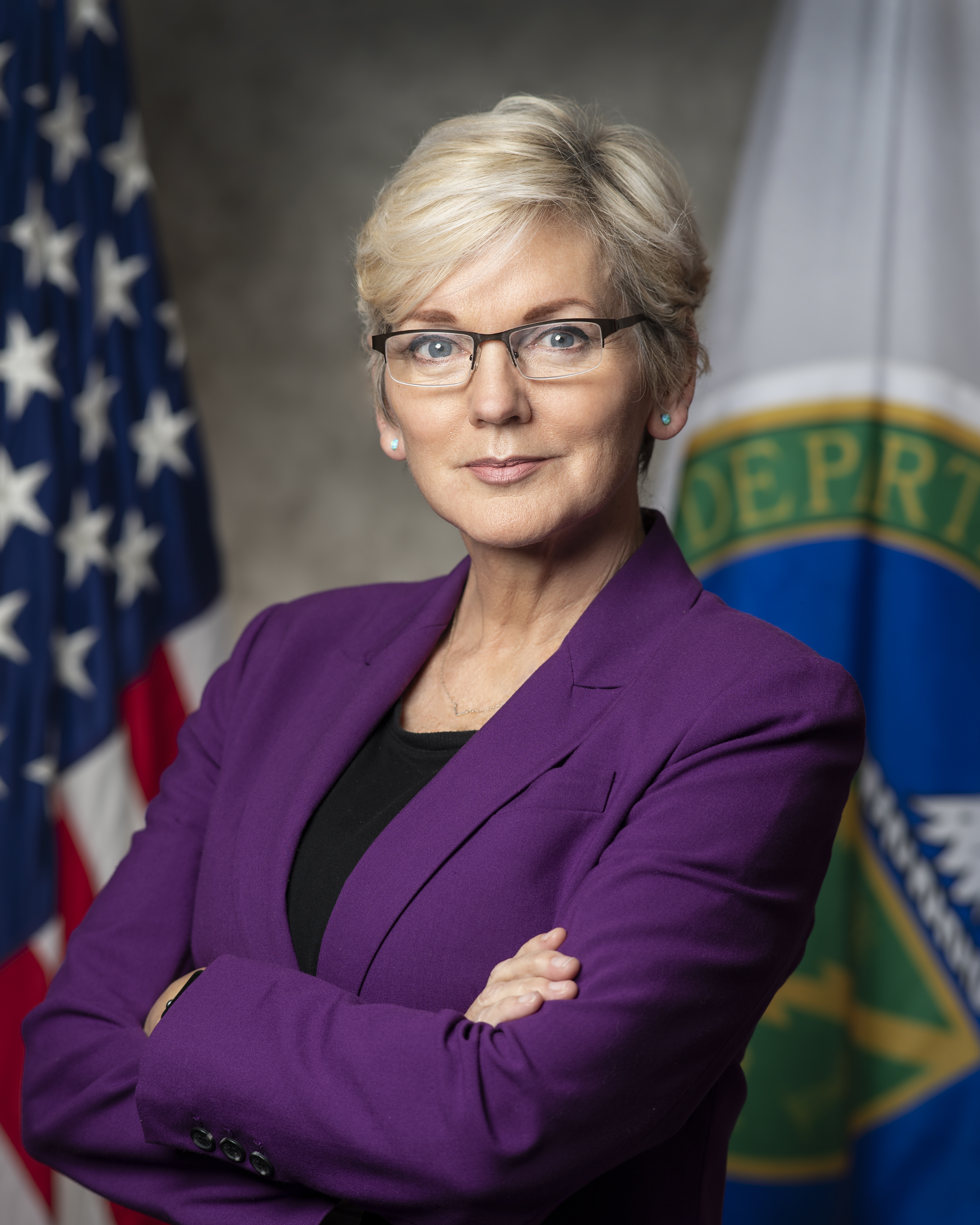
Jennifer Granholm

- Governor of Michigan - Jennifer Granholm (Democrat)
- Lieutenant Governor of Michigan: John D. Cherry (Democrat)
- Michigan Attorney General - Mike Cox (Republican)
- Michigan Secretary of State - Terri Lynn Land (Republican)
- Speaker of the Michigan House of Representatives: Craig DeRoche (Republican)
- Majority Leader of the Michigan Senate: Ken Sikkema (Republican)
- Chief Justice, Michigan Supreme Court: Clifford Taylor

=== Federal office holders ===
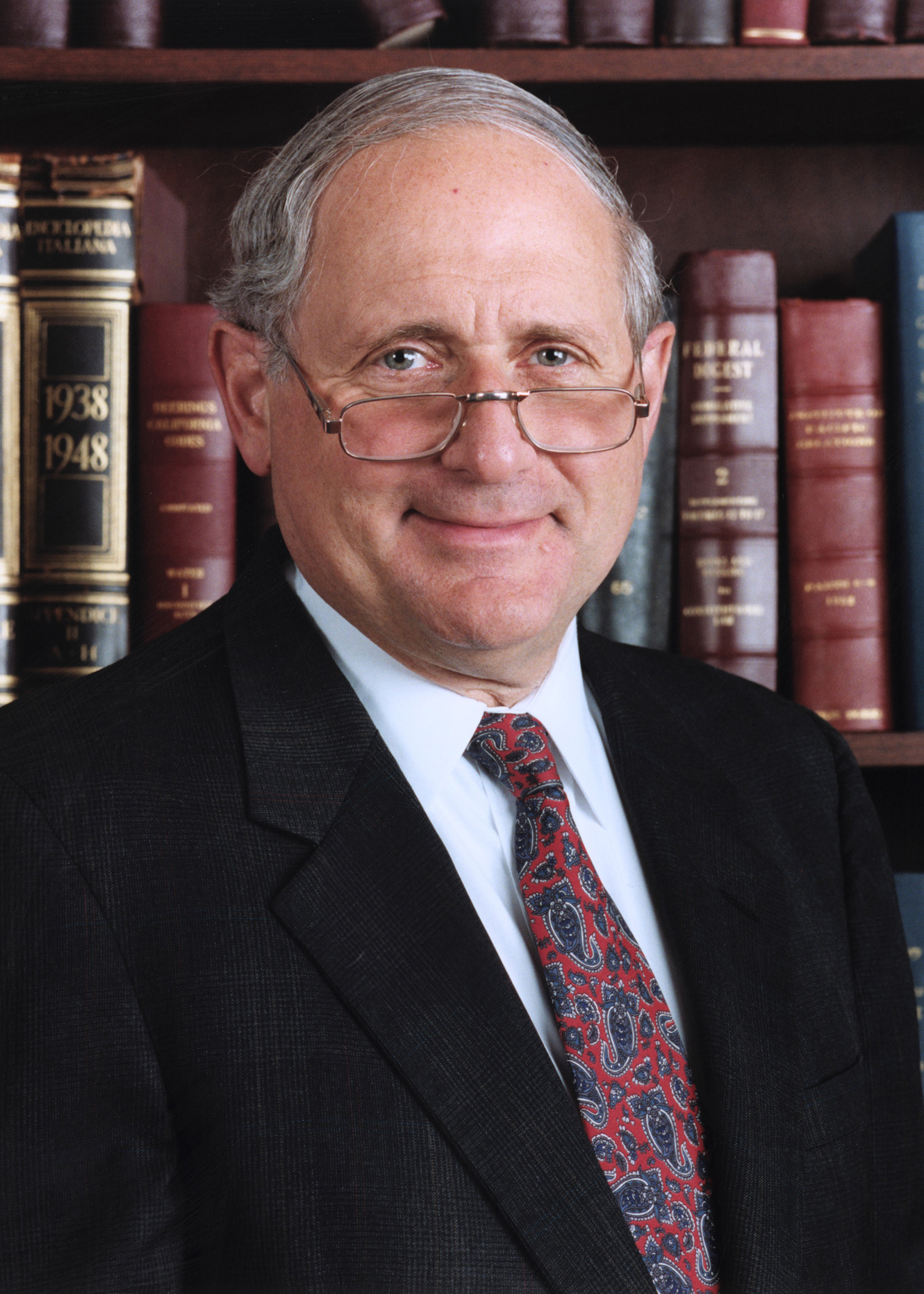
Carl Levin

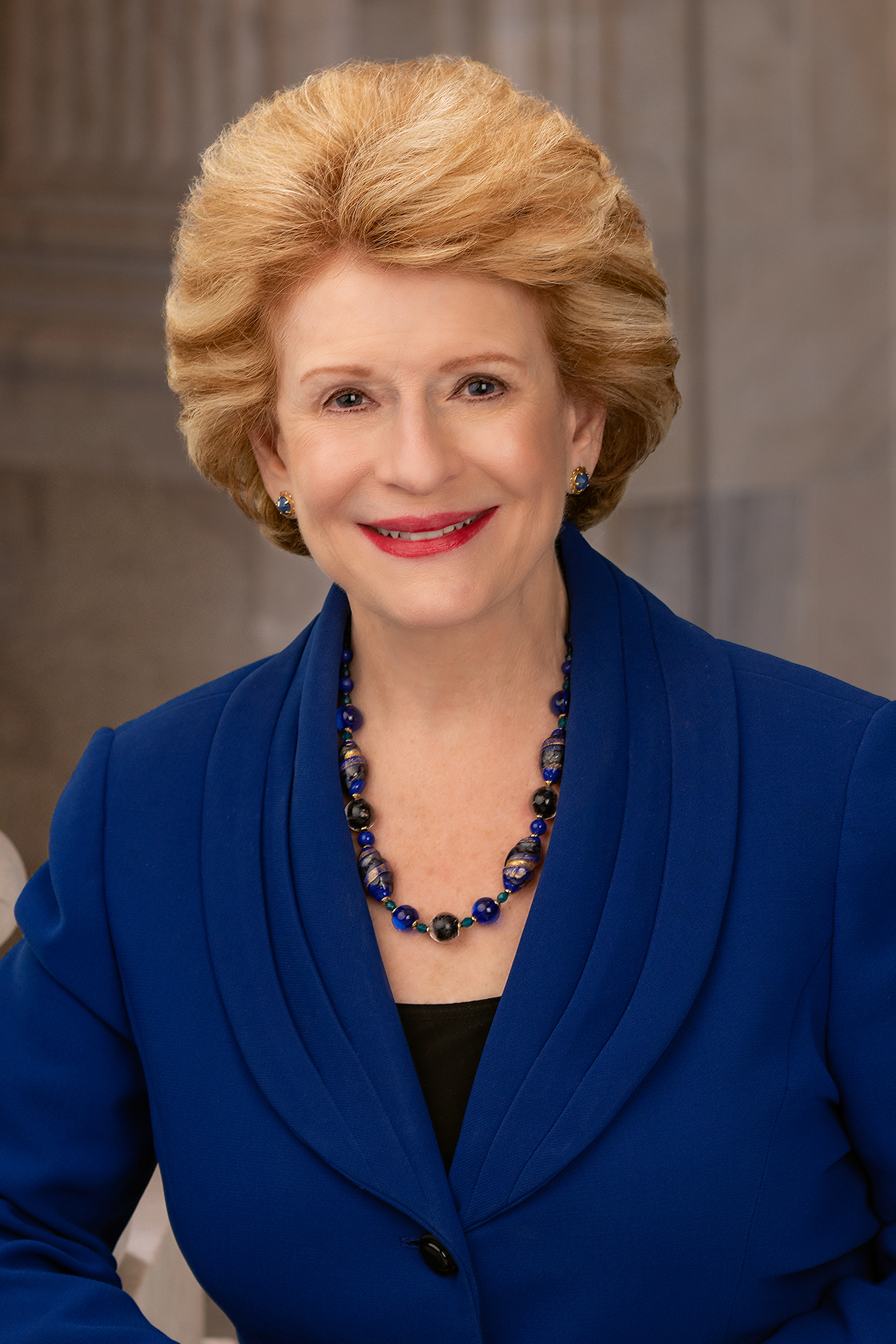
Debbie Stabenow

- U.S. Senator from Michigan: Debbie Stabenow (Democrat])
- U.S. Senator from Michigan: Carl Levin (Democrat)
- House District 1: Bart Stupak (Democrat)
- House District 2: Pete Hoekstra (Republican)
- House District 3: Vern Ehlers (Republican)
- House District 4: Dave Camp (Republican)
- House District 5: Dale Kildee (Democrat)
- House District 6: Fred Upton (Republican)
- House District 7: Joe Schwarz (Republican)
- House District 8: Mike Rogers (Republican)
- House District 9: Joe Knollenberg (Democrat)
- House District 10: David Bonior (Democrat)
- House District 11: Joe Knollenberg (Republican)
- House District 12: Sander Levin (Democrat)
- House District 13: Lynn N. Rivers (Democrat)
- House District 14: John Conyers (Democrat)
- House District 15: John Conyers (Democrat)

=== Mayors of major cities ===
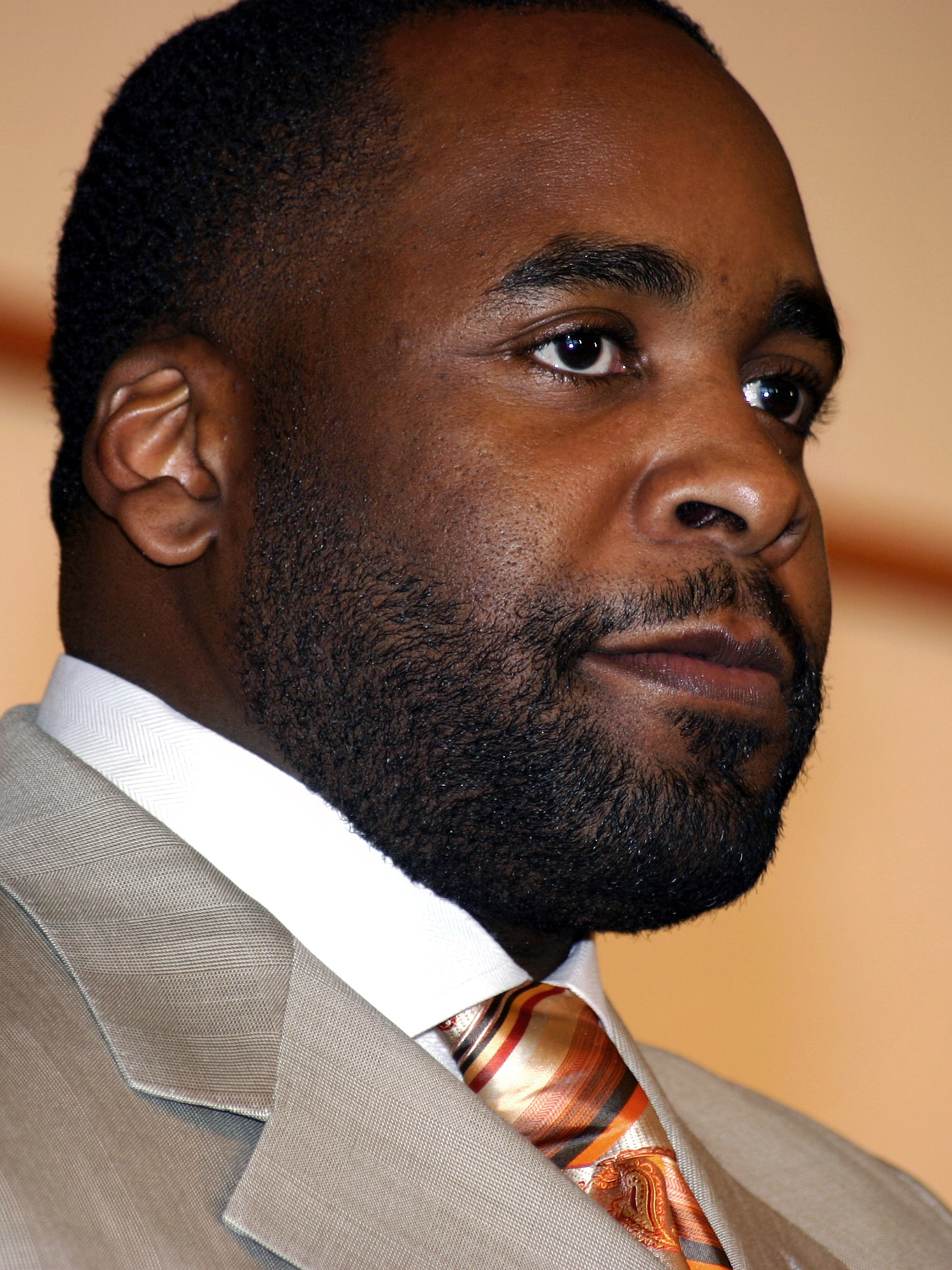
Kwame Kilpatrick

- Mayor of Detroit: Kwame Kilpatrick (Democrat)
- Mayor of Grand Rapids: George Heartwell
- Mayor of Ann Arbor: John Hieftje (Democrat)
- Mayor of Lansing: Antonio Benavides
- Mayor of Flint: Don Williamson
- Mayor of Saginaw: Wilmer Jones Ham

== Sports ==
=== Baseball ===
- 2006 Detroit Tigers season - In their first year under manager Jim Leyland, the Tigers compiled a 95–67 record, defeated the New York Yankees and Oakland A's in the playoffs, and lost to the St. Louis Cardinals in the 2006 World Series. The team's statistical leaders included Carlos Guillen (.320 batting average, 20 stolen bases, .400 on-base percentage), Magglio Ordóñez (104 RBIs), Craig Monroe (28 home runs), and pitchers Kenny Rogers (17–7, 95 strikeouts), Justin Verlander (17–9, 124 strikeouts, 3.63 ERA), and Jeremy Bonderman (14–8, 202 strikeouts).

=== American football ===
- 2006 Detroit Lions season - In their first year under head coach Rod Marinelli, the Lions compiled the worst record in the NFL, 3–13. The team's statistical leaders included Jon Kitna (4,208 passing yards), Kevin Jones (689 rushing yards), and Roy Williams (1,310 receiving yards).
- Super Bowl XL - The Pittsburgh Steelers defeated the Seattle Seahawks, 21–10, at Ford Field in Detroit. Hines Ward was selected as the game's most valuable player. The national anthem was sung by Aaron Neville, Aretha Franklin, and Dr. John. The halftime show was by The Rolling Stones.
- 2006 Michigan Wolverines football team
- 2006 Michigan State Spartans football team

=== Basketball ===
- 2005–06 Detroit Pistons season - In their first season under head coach Flip Saunders, the Pistons compiled a 64–18 record (the best in the NBA), defeated the Milwaukee Bucks and Cleveland Cavaliers in the playoffs, and lost to the Miami Heat in the Eastern Conference finals. The team's statistical leaders included Richard Hamilton (1,609 points), Ben Wallace (923 rebounds), and Chauncey Billups (699 assists).
- 2006 Detroit Shock season - Led by head coach Bill Laimbeer, the Shock compiled a 23–11 record and won the WNBA championship, defeating the Sacramento Monarchs in the WNBA finals. The team's statistical leaders included Deanna Nolan (468 points, 124 assists) and Cheryl Ford (363 rebounds).
- 2005–06 Michigan Wolverines men's basketball team
- 2005–06 Michigan State Spartans men's basketball team

=== Ice hockey ===
- 2005–06 Detroit Red Wings season - In their first season under head coach Mike Babcock, the Red Wings a 58–16–8 record, the best in the NHL, but lost in the first round of the playoffs to the Edmonton Oilers. The team's statistical leaders included Brendan Shanahan (40 goals), Nicklas Lidstrom (64 assists), and Pavel Datsyuk (87 points).

=== Auto racing ===
- 2006 3M Performance 400
- 2006 Firestone Indy 400
- 2006 GFS Marketplace 400

== Chronology of events ==
=== February ===
- February 5

- Super Bowl XL: The Pittsburgh Steelers defeated the Seattle Seahawks, 21–10, at Ford Field in Detroit. Hines Ward was selected as the game's most valuable player. The national anthem was sung by Aaron Neville, Aretha Franklin, and Dr. John.
- Super Bowl XL halftime show: The Rolling Stones

=== April ===
- April 11 - Murder of rapper Proof, shot while playing billiards at a club in Detroit

=== September ===
- August 30-September 9 - WNBA Finals: The Detroit Shock defeated the Sacramento Monarchs in five games. Deanna Nolan was selected as the most valuable player of the finals.

=== October ===
- October 10–14 - American League Championship Series: Having beaten the New York Yankees in the Division Series, the Detroit Tigers swept the Oakland Athletics in four games.
- October 21–27 - 2006 World Series: The Tigers lost to the St. Louis Cardinals in five games.

=== November ===
- November 7 - Election day in Michigan

- 2006 Michigan gubernatorial election: Democratic incumbent Jennifer Granholm tallied 2,142,513 votes (56.36%) to defeat Republican challenger Dick DeVos who received 1,608,086 votes (42.30%).
- 2006 United States Senate election in Michigan: Democratic incumbent Debbie Stabenow tallied 2,151,278 votes (56.91%) to defeat Republican challenger Mike Bouchard who garnered 1,559,597 votes (41.26%).
- 2006 United States House of Representatives elections in Michigan: No seats were flipped. Michigan's delegation remained with nine Republicans and six Democrats.
- 2006 Michigan Attorney General election: Incumbent Republican Mike Cox defeated Democratic challenger Amos Williams by a margin of 53.8% to 43.5%.
- 2006 Michigan Secretary of State election: Incumbent Republican Terri Lynn Land defeated Democratic challenger by a margin of 56.15% to 41.96%.
- 2006 Michigan Senate election: Democrats flipped one seat, but the majority remained Republican by a 21 to 17 margin.
- 2006 Michigan House of Representatives election: Democrats flipped six seats and took control of the House by a 58 to 52 margin.
- Michigan Civil Rights Initiative: Proposal 2 on the 2006 ballot was passed by a margin of 2,141,010 votes (57.92%) to 1,555,691 votes (42.08%). The initiative banned affirmative action programs that gave preferential treatment to groups or individuals based on their race, gender, color, ethnicity or national origin for public employment, education or contracting purposes.

=== December ===
- December 13 - Murder of Laura Dickinson: The murder of an Eastern Michigan University student in her dormitory room led to the firing of the university's president and police chief for covering up facts relating to the murder. Fellow student Orange Taylor III was convicted of the murder.
- December 26 - 2006 Motor City Bowl: Central Michigan defeated Middle Tennessee, 31–14, at Ford Field in Detroit.

== Births ==
- April 26 - Jude Wellings, soccer player, in Birmingham
- September 6 - Trey McKenney, basketball player, in Flint
- November 16 - Darius Acuff, basketball player, in Detroit

== Deaths ==
- January 10 - Dave Brown, cornerback at UM (1972–1974), NFL (1975–1999), College Football Hall of Fame, at age 52
- January 11 - Eric Namesnik, swimmer, at age 35
- January 18 - Thomas Murphy, General Motors CEO, at age 90
- January 19 - Wilson Pickett, singer and songwriter, influential in development of soul music ("In the Midnight Hour", "Mustang Sally"), inducted into Rock and Roll Hall of Fame, at age 64
- February 7 - Jack Montrose, jazz tenor saxophonist, at age 77
- February 10 - Norman Shumway, pioneer of heart surgery, at age 83
- February 15 - J Dilla, rapper, record producer, composer, at age 32
- March 3 - Richard Vander Veen, US Congress (1974–1977), at age 83
- March 27 - Ron Schipper, football coach at Central (IA) (1961–1996), College Football Hall of Fame, born and died in Michigan, at age 77
- April 11 - Proof, rapper, at age 32 from gunshot wound
- April 17 - Al Cederberg, US Congress (1953–1978), at age 88
- April 28 - Steve Howe, MLB pitcher (1980–1996), at age 48
- May 30 - Chuck Kocsis, NCAA golfing champion (1936), Michigan Open champion (1931, 1945–1946), at 93
- June 13 - Freddie Gorman, Motown singer and songwriter ("Please Mr. Postman"), member of The Originals, at age 67
- July 27 - Maryann Mahaffey, Detroit City Council (1973–2005), at age 81
- August 4 - Elden Auker, Detroit Tigers pitcher (1933–38), at age 95
- August 7 - Bob Miller, Detroit Lions tackle (1952–1958), at age 76
- September 20 - Muddy Waters, football coach at Hillsdale (1954–1973), Saginaw Valley State (1974–1979), and Michigan State (1980–1982), at age 83
- October 2 - Paul Halmos, mathematician and probablist at UM (1961–1967), at age 90
- October 4 - Vic Heyliger, hockey player at UM (1934–37) and NHL (1937–44), UM hockey coach (1944–57), at age 94
- October 21 - Bob Mann, end for UM (1944, 1946–47) and Detroit Lions (1948–39), at age 82
- November 12 - Tom Slade, UM quarterback (1971–1973), at age 54
- November 17 - Bo Schembechler, Michigan head football coach (1969–1989), at age 77
- November 22 - Pat Dobson, Detroit Tigers pitcher (1967–1969), at age 64
- December 24 - Frank Stanton, president of CBS (1946–1971), native of Muskegon, at age 98
- December 26 - Gerald Ford, 38th President, at age 93
- 2006 - Sarah Elizabeth Ray, civil rights activist in Detroit, plaintiff in case against Bob-Lo that went to US Supreme Court, at age circa 85

== See also ==
- 2006 in the United States
