= 2003 in Michigan =

- Decades: 1980s; 1990s; 2000s; 2010s; 2020s
- See also: History of Michigan; Historical outline of Michigan; List of years in Michigan; 2003 in the United States

This article reviews 2003 in Michigan, including the state's office holders, largest public companies, performance of sports teams, a chronology of the state's top news and sports stories, and notable Michigan-related births and deaths.

== Top stories ==
The top news stories of 2003 in Michigan included:

- Jennifer Granholm sworn in as Michigan's first woman governor
- Benton Harbor riots - Following the death of a black motorcyclist in a police chase, two nights of violence ensued in mid-June.
- Northeast blackout of 2003 - Widespread power outage throughout parts of the Northeast, Midwest, and Ontario on August 14
- Grutter v. Bollinger - Landmark US Supreme Court decision holding that the University of Michigan Law School's "narrowly tailored use of race in admissions decisions" was constitutional (reversed 20 years later in the Students for Fair Admissions v. Harvard decision);
- Kwame Kilpatrick's alleged wild party at the Manoogian Mansion and his firing of the deputy police chief responsible for investigating the reports
- After being released from prison due to a clerical error, convicted drug dealer Daniel Franklin murdered his ex-wife and two of her children in Pontiac
- Indictment of 19 Detroit police officers for stealing drugs, guns and money from suspected drug dealers

The top sports stories included:

- The 2002–03 Red Wings compiling a 48–20–10–4 record, but becoming the first defending Stanley Cup champion to be swept in the first round of the playoffs (by the Anaheim Mighty Ducks) since 1952;
- The 2003 Michigan Wolverines football team going 10–2 in the regular season, winning the Big Ten championship, and losing to USC in the 2004 Rose Bowl;
- The 2003 Detroit Shock compiling a 25–9 record, improving from 9–23 in 2002, going "From Worst To First", and winning the WNBA championship;
- The 2003 Detroit Tigers compiling a 43–119 record, matching the American League record for most losses in a season; and
- The 2003 Detroit Lions, in their first season under head coach Steve Mariucci, compiling a 5–11 record.

== Office holders ==
=== State office holders ===
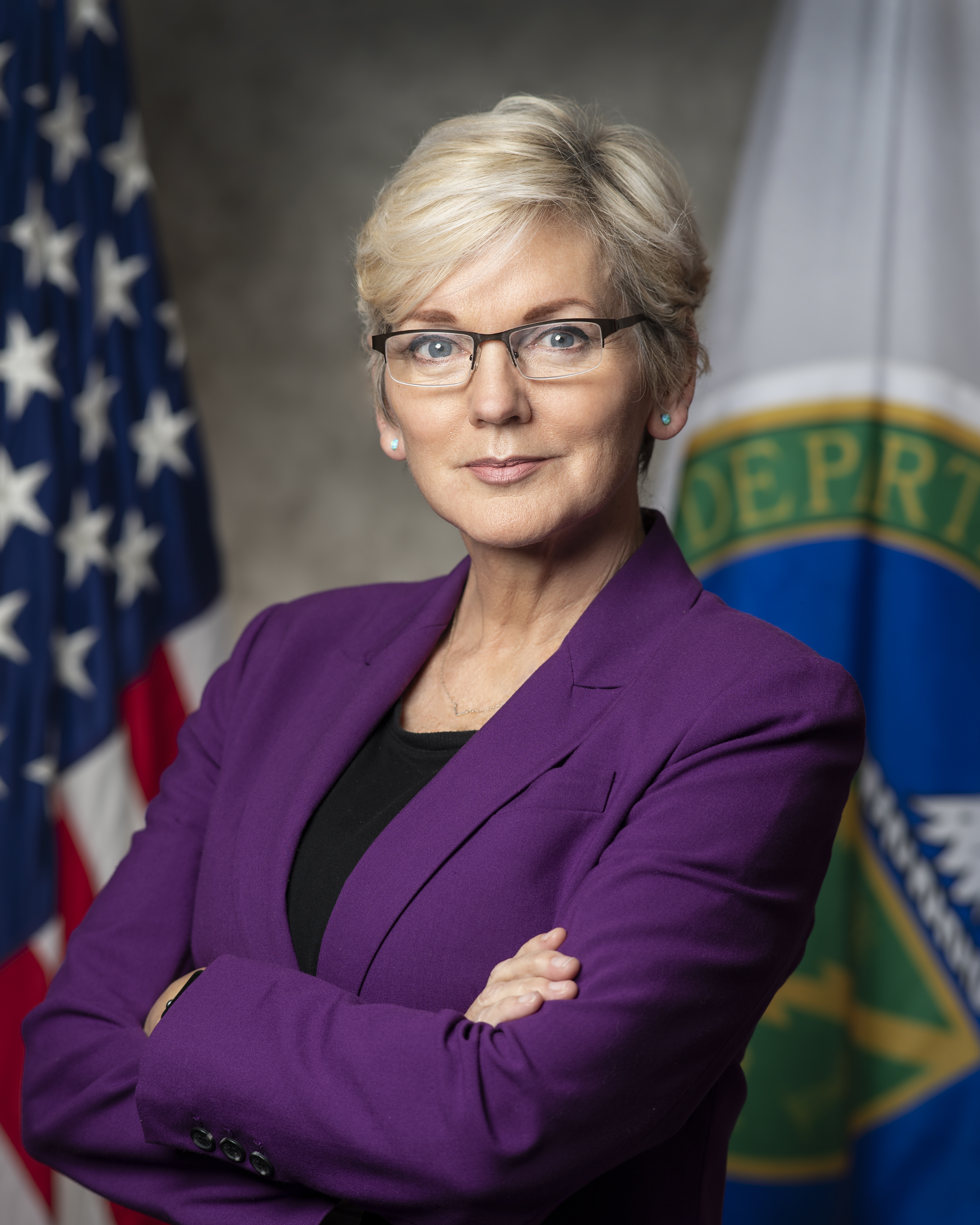
Jennifer Granholm

- Governor of Michigan - Jennifer Granholm (Democrat)
- Lieutenant Governor of Michigan: John D. Cherry (Democrat)
- Michigan Attorney General - Mike Cox (Republican)
- Michigan Secretary of State - Terri Lynn Land (Republican)
- Speaker of the Michigan House of Representatives: Rick ohnson (Republican)
- Majority Leader of the Michigan Senate: Ken Sikkema (Republican)
- Chief Justice, Michigan Supreme Court: Maura D. Corrigan

=== Federal office holders ===
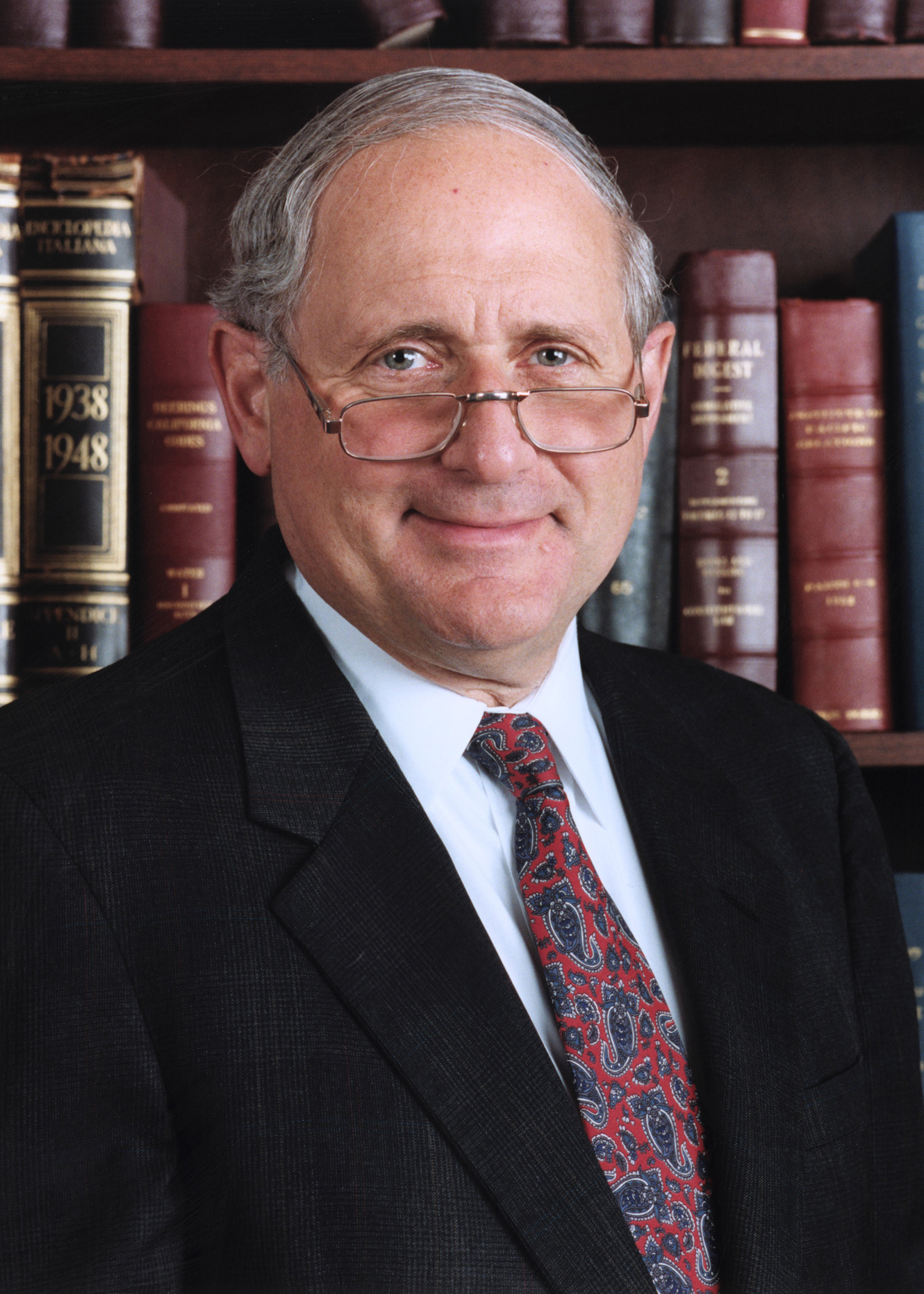
Carl Levin

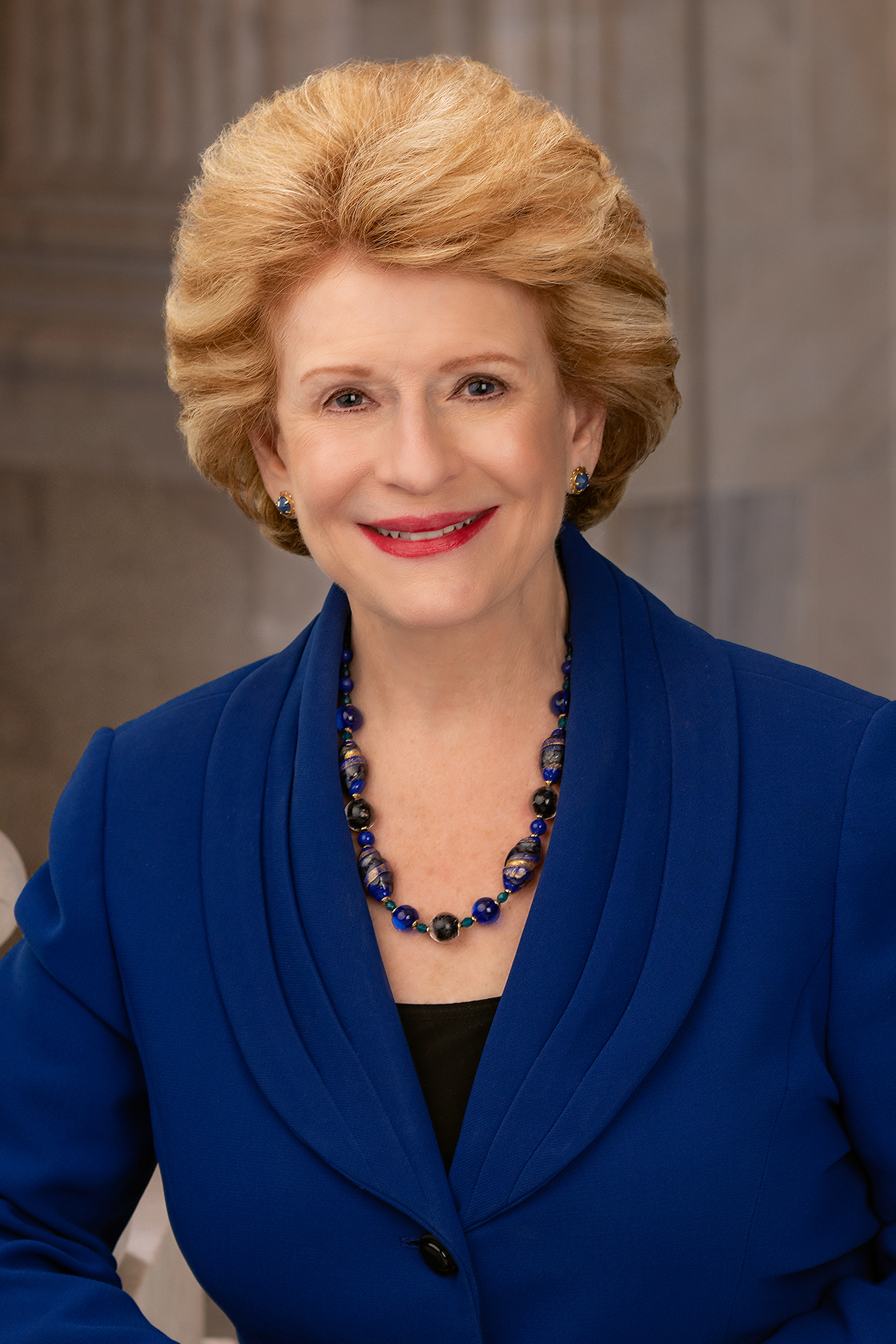
Debbie Stabenow

- U.S. senator from Michigan: Debbie Stabenow (Democrat])
- U.S. senator from Michigan: Carl Levin (Democrat)
- House District 1: Bart Stupak (Democrat)
- House District 2: Pete Hoekstra (Republican)
- House District 3: Vern Ehlers (Republican)
- House District 4: Dave Camp (Republican)
- House District 5: Dale Kildee (Democrat)
- House District 6: Fred Upton (Republican)
- House District 7: Nick Smith (Republican)
- House District 8: Mike Rogers (Republican)
- House District 9: Joe Knollenberg (Democrat)
- House District 10: David Bonior (Democrat)
- House District 11: Joe Knollenberg (Republican)
- House District 12: Sander Levin (Democrat)
- House District 13: Carolyn Cheeks Kilpatrick (Democrat)
- House District 14: John Conyers (Democrat)
- House District 15: John Dingell (Democrat)

=== Mayors of major cities ===
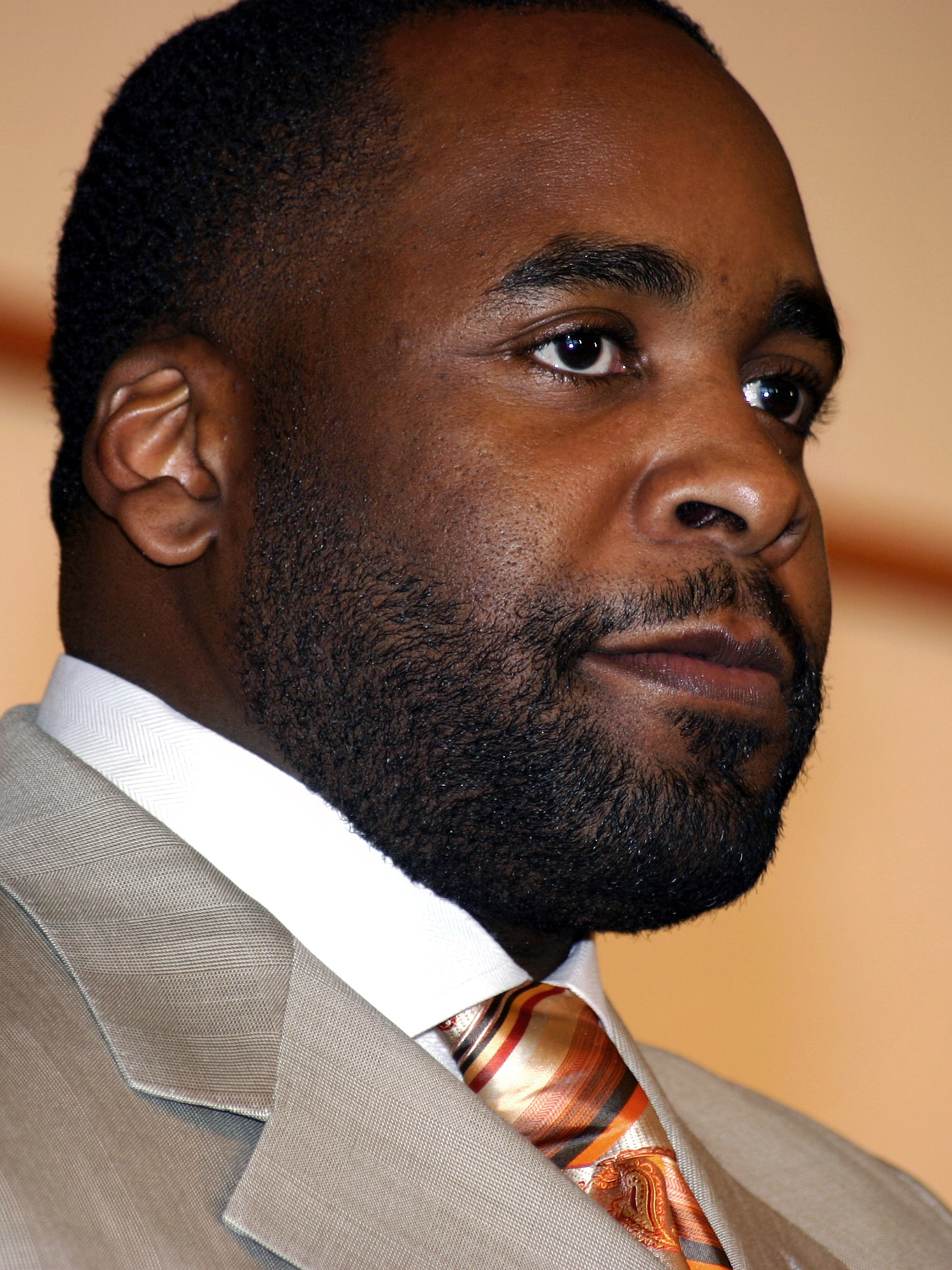
Kwame Kilpatrick

- Mayor of Detroit: Kwame Kilpatrick (Democrat)
- Mayor of Grand Rapids: John H. Logie
- Mayor of Ann Arbor: John Hieftje (Democrat)
- Mayor of Lansing: Antonio Benavides
- Mayor of Flint: Don Williamson
- Mayor of Saginaw: Wilmer Jones Ham

== Largest public companies ==
In March 2004, the Detroit Free Press released its annual "The Free Press 50" list of the largest Michigan-based public companies based on 2003 revenues. The top 10 companies are shown below.

Rank	Company	Headquarters	Business	2003 revenue (in billions)	2003 profit (in billions)	Change from 2002
1	General Motors	Detroit	Autos	$185.524	3.822	+120.16%
2	Ford Motor Company	Dearborn	Autos	$164.196	$0.495	−
3	Dow Chemical Company	Midland	Chemicals	$32.632	$1.730	-
4	Delphi Automotive Systems	Troy	Auto supplier	$28.096	-$.056	-
5	KMart Holding Corp.	Troy	Retailer	$23.253	-$.614	+80.93%
6	Visteon Corp.	Dearborn	Auto supplier	$17.660	-$1.213	-244.6%
7	Lear Corporation	Southfield	Auto supplier	$15.746	$.380	+2,826%
8	Whirlpool Corporation	Benton Harbor	Appliances	$12.176	$.414	-
9	Masco Corp.	Taylor	Building products	$10.936	$.806	+36.61%
10	Pulte Corp.	Bloomfield Hills	Home builders	$9.048	$0.624	+37.69%
11	Kellogg Co.	Battle Creek	Food	$8.811	$.787	+9.18%

== Sports ==
=== Baseball ===
- 2003 Detroit Tigers season - In their first season under manager Alan Trammell, the Tigers compiled a 43–119 record. They set and American League record with 119 losses and were the first team in Major League Baseball since the 1962 Mets to finish with a winning percentage below .300. By winning five of their last six games, they avoided becoming the worst team of the 20th century. Dmitri Young led the team with 29 home runs, 85 RBIs, and a .297 batting average. Mike Maroth was the team's leading pitcher with a 9-21 record and a 5.73 earned run average.

=== American football ===
- 2003 Detroit Lions season - In their first season under head coach Steve Mariucci, the Lions compiled a 5–11 record, finished in fourth place in the NFL North, and were outscored, 379 to 270. The team's statistical leaders included Joey Harrington (2,880 passing yards), Shawn Bryson (606 rushing yards), and Az-Zahir Hakim (449 receiving yards).
- 2003 Michigan Wolverines football team - In their ninth season under head coach Lloyd Carr, the Wolverines compiled a 10–3 record, won the Big Ten championship, and lost to USC in the 2004 Rose Bowl. The team's statistical leaders included John Navarre (3,331 passing yards), Chris Perry (1,674 rushing yards and 120 points), and Braylon Edwards (1,138 receiving yards).
- 2003 Michigan State Spartans football team - In their first season under head coach John L. Smith, the Spartans compiled an 8–5 record, including a loss to Nebraska in the 2003 Alamo Bowl. The team's statistical leaders included Jeff Smoker (3,395 passing yards), Jaren Hayes (609 rushing yards), and Agim Shabaj (692 receiving yards).
- 2003 Grand Valley State Lakers football team - In their 13th season under head coach Brian Kelly, the Lakers compiled a 14–1 record, outscored opponents by a total of 551 to 200, and won its second consecutive NCAA Division II national championship, defeating North Dakota in the championship game.

=== Basketball ===
- 2002–03 Detroit Pistons season - In their second and final season under head coach Rick Carlisle, the Pistons compiled a 50–32 record and lost to the New Jersey Nets in the Eastern Conference finals. Ben Wallace led the NBA with 1,126 rebounds and 293 offensive rebounds. The team's other statistical leaders included Richard Hamilton (1,612 points) and Chauncey Billups (287 assists).
- 2003 Detroit Shock season - In their first year under head coach Bill Laimbeer, the team compiled a 25–9 record and won the WNBA championship. The team went from last place in 2002 with a 9–23 record to champions in 2003. Laimbeer was named WNBA coach of the year. The team's statistical leaders included Swin Cash (548 points), Elaine Powell (129 assists), and Cheryl Ford (334 rebounds).
- 2002–03 Michigan State Spartans men's basketball team - In their eighth season under head coach Tom Izzo, the Spartans compiled a 22–13 record and advanced to the Elite Eight. The team's statistical leaders included Chris Hill (479 points, 128 assists) and Aloysius Anagonye (186 rebounds).
- 2002–03 Michigan Wolverines men's basketball team - In their second season under head coach Tommy Amaker, the Wolverines compiled an 18–12 record. LaVell Blanchard (485 points, 205 rebounds) and Daniel Horton (457 points, 134 assists) were selected as the team's most valuable players.

=== Ice hockey ===
- 2002–03 Detroit Red Wings season - In their first season under head coach Dave Lewis, the Red Wings compiled a 48–20–10–4 record and lost to the Anaheim Mighty Ducks in the first round of the playoffs. They were the first defending Stanley Cup champion to be swept in the first round of the playoffs since 1952. The team's statistical leaders included Sergei Fedorov (83 points, 47 assists) and Brett Hull (37 goals).

=== Other ===
- 2003 Sirius 400 - NASCAR Winston Cup race at Michigan International Speedway on June 15
- 2003 Firestone Indy 400 - IndyCar race at Michigan International Speedway on July 27
- 2003 GFS Marketplace 400 - NASCAR Winston Cup race at Michigan International Speedway on August 17
- Floyd Mayweather Jr. vs. Phillip N'dou - On November 1, Michigan native Floyd Mayweather Jr. successfully defended his lightweight boxing championship at Van Andel Arena in Grand Rapids.

== Chronology of events ==
- January 1 - Jennifer Granholm sworn in as first woman to serve as governor of Michigan
- February 15 - Melvin Hollowell and incumbent Chairman Mark Brewer are elected co-chairmen of the Michigan Democratic Party.
- June - Benton Harbor riots
- June 23 - Grutter v. Bollinger
- August 14 - Northeast blackout of 2003
- November 1 - Floyd Mayweather Jr. vs. Phillip N'dou: Michigan native Floyd Mayweather Jr. successfully defended his lightweight boxing championship at Van Andel Arena in Grand Rapids.
- December 13 - Grand Valley State defeats North Dakota in the NCAA Division II national championship game. It was the program's second consecutive national championship under head coach Brian Kelly.

== Births ==
- January 20 - J. J. McCarthy, quarterback at U-M (2021–2023), in Evanston, IL
- January 20 - Udodi Onwuzurike, sprinter, in Detroit
- January 28 - Carson Hocevar, NASCAR drive, in Portage
- February 16 - Kayden Pierre, hockey player, in Rochester Hills
- February 25 - Donovan Edwards, running back at UM (2021–2024), in West Bloomfield
- March 15 - Hobbs Kessler, middle-distance runner, in Ann Arbor
- March 29 - Will Johnson, cornerback at UM (2022–2024), in Detroit
- July 5 - Terrell Ransom Jr., actor and model, in Royal Oak
- September 2 - Mason Graham, defensive tackle at UM (2022–2024), in Mission Viejo, CA
- October 25 - Tegan Marie, country singer and songwriter, at age 13 the youngest female singer to sign to a major country label since Tanya Tucker in 1972, in Grand Blanc

== Deaths ==
- January 18 - The Sheikh, professional wrestler (1947-1998), at age 76
- February 2 - Marcello Truzzi, professor of sociology, at age 67
- February 10 - Robert Rush Miller, ichthyology and conservation, at age 86
- February 15 - Ted Kress, U-M football player (1951–53), at age 71
- March 2 - Hank Ballard, lead singer of the Midnighters, inducted into Rock and Roll Hall of Fame, at age 79
- April 2 - Edwin Starr, Motown recording star (No. 1 with "War"), at age 61
- April 2 - Harold S. Sawyer, US Congress (1977–85), at age 83
- April 23 - Martha Griffiths, US Congress (1955–74), at age 91
- May 6 - Art Houtteman, Detroit Tigers pitcher (1945–1953), at age 75
- May 14 - Dave DeBusschere, NBA (1962–74), at age 62
- May 28 - Martha Scott, actress, at age 90
- June 27 - David Newman, screenwriter (Bonnie and Clyde, Superman), at age 66
- July 4 - Tyler McVey, actor, at age 91
- July 16 - John Regeczi, U-M fullback/halfback (1932–34), at age 90
- August 9 - Billy Rogell, Detroit Tigers (1930–1939), Detroit City Council (1942-1980), at age 98
- September 1 - Brian Ottney, football center for Michigan State (2000-2002), at age 23 by suicide
- September 25 - George Plimpton, writer/participatory journalist (Paper Lion (1966), at age 76
