= Carmella Sabaugh =

American politician

Macomb County Clerk/Register of Deeds
- In office January 1, 1993 – December 31, 2016
- Preceded by: Edna Miller
- Succeeded by: Karen Spranger

Personal details
- Born: August 3, 1938 Warren, Michigan, U.S.
- Died: June 8, 2024 (aged 85) Sterling Heights, Michigan, U.S.
- Party: Democratic
- Education: Wayne State University; Western Michigan University

Carmella Sabaugh (née Visconti) was an American politician. She served as County Clerk/Register of Deeds for Macomb County, Michigan from 1993 to 2017. Sabaugh was the 2006 Democratic candidate for Michigan Secretary of State.

== Early life ==
She was born of Italian-American Catholic parents as Carmella Visconti in Detroit on August 3, 1938. She was orphaned at age eight and raised by an aunt and uncle. She graduated in 1956 from Denby High School, and attended Wayne State University and Western Michigan University.

She lived in Warren and had five grown children.

Sabaugh served on the Warren city council in 1975-79. She was elected Warren city clerk in 1979 and served 11 years. In 1992, she was elected Macomb County Clerk, and was re-elected in 1996, 2000, and 2004, 2008 and 2012.

== 2006 Secretary of State Election ==
Sabaugh secured the Democratic nomination for Michigan Secretary of State on August 27, 2006, defeating state Rep. Mary Waters at the Michigan Democratic Party convention. Sabaugh was easily defeated by Republican incumbent Terri Lynn Land, losing by a margin of 56 percent to 42 percent.

== 2016 Macomb County Clerk Election ==
In March 2016, Sabaugh filed to seek a seventh term as County Clerk. Speculation began to arise that Sabaugh may drop out of the race after Macomb County Commissioner and former state Rep. Fred Miller announced on April 15 that he would challenge Sabaugh for the Democratic nomination for County Clerk. On April 19, the filing deadline to qualify for Michigan's August primary ballot, Sabaugh called speculation that she would drop out of the race "wishful thinking," while Miller officially filed for the Clerk's race just minutes before the 4 p.m. deadline. On April 22, just 15 minutes before Michigan's 4 p.m. deadline to withdraw from the ballot, Sabaugh announced she would not seek re-election and immediately endorsed Miller, citing a desire to spend more time with her family.

On May 2, 2016, Mt. Clemens political activist Greg Murray filed ethics complaints with the Macomb County Ethics Board against Miller and Sabaugh, saying the pair colluded with former Michigan Democratic Party Chairman Mark Brewer, who filed to run for Miller's seat on the Macomb County Board of Commissioners, saying that Miller personally filed Brewer's paperwork just minutes before the April 19th 4 p.m. filing deadline, an accusation that Miller refused to deny directly. County Executive Mark Hackel said the accusations were "extremely questionable” and that the situation "...doesn’t come across well for voters."

The "plan" backfired for Sabaugh, Miller and Brewer on all fronts. First, Brewer was defeated in the August 2016 primary for the Democratic nomination for Miller's old seat on the Macomb County Board of Commissioners by Elizabeth Lucido. Miller was upset by political novice Karen Spranger, by a margin of 635 votes out of the approximately 376,000 cast. Miller's stunning loss was attributed to the political coattails of Republican Presidential nominee Donald Trump. Trump garnered 54 percent of the vote in Macomb County, which also saw Republicans Candice Miller (no relation to Fred) and Larry Rocca win countywide races as Public Works Commissioner and County Treasurer respectively and Trump became the first Republican to carry Michigan in a presidential election since 1988.

== Electoral history ==
=== Macomb County Clerk ===
1992 Macomb County Clerk Democratic Primary
Party	Candidate	Votes	%
Democratic	Carmella Sabaugh	26,925	53.8
Democratic	Edna Miller (incumbent)	23,516	46.2

1992 Macomb County Clerk election
Party	Candidate	Votes	%	±%
Democratic	Carmella Sabaugh	158,544	54.4	−45.5
Republican	Diane A. Patroske	133,138	45.6	+45.6
Majority		25,406	8.8	−91.2
Turnout		291,688		+75.4
Democratic hold				

1996 Macomb County Clerk Democratic Primary
Party	Candidate	Votes	%
Democratic	Carmella Sabaugh (incumbent)	20,504	53.9
Democratic	Constance Miller	17,543	46.1

1996 Macomb County Clerk election
Party	Candidate	Votes	%	±%
Democratic	Carmella Sabaugh (incumbent)	158,544	54.4	−45.5
Republican	Diane A. Patroske	133,138	45.6	+45.6
Majority		25,406	8.8	−91.2
Turnout		291,688		+75.4
Democratic hold				

2000 Macomb County Clerk Democratic Primary
Party	Candidate	Votes	%	±%
Democratic	Carmella Sabaugh (incumbent)	27,177	59.7	+5.8
Democratic	Constance Miller	18,331	40.3	−5.8

2000 Macomb County Clerk election
Party	Candidate	Votes	%	±%
Democratic	Carmella Sabaugh (incumbent)	195,723	62.7	+8.3
Republican	Alvin Kukuk	116,467	37.3	−8.3
Majority		79,256	25.4	+16.6
Turnout		312,190		+7.0
Democratic hold				

2004 Macomb County Clerk election
Party	Candidate	Votes	%	±%
Democratic	Carmella Sabaugh (incumbent)	235,664	64.4	+1.7
Republican	Charles Pierce	130,291	35.6	−1.7
Majority		105,373	28.8	+3.4
Turnout		365,855		+17.2
Democratic hold				

2008 Macomb County Clerk election
Party	Candidate	Votes	%	±%
Democratic	Carmella Sabaugh (incumbent)	262,017	68.5	+4.1
Republican	Michael J. Arsenault	120,263	31.5	−4.1
Majority		141,754	37.0	+8.2
Turnout		382,280		+4.5
Democratic hold				

2012 Macomb County Clerk Democratic Primary
Party	Candidate	Votes	%
Democratic	Carmella Sabaugh (incumbent)	42,712	79.6
Democratic	Darcy Jakubowski	10,934	20.4

2012 Macomb County Clerk election
Party	Candidate	Votes	%	±%
Democratic	Carmella Sabaugh (incumbent)	242,037	65.3	−3.2
Republican	Debera Guenther	128,477	31.5	+3.2
Majority		113,560	33.8	−3.2
Turnout		370,514		−3.1
Democratic hold				

=== Michigan Secretary of State ===
2006 Michigan Secretary of State election
Party	Candidate	Votes	%	±%
Republican	Terri Lynn Land (I)	2,089,864	56.2	+1.2
Democratic	Carmella Sabaugh	1,561,828	42.0	−1.0
Green	Lynn Meadows	70,218	1.9	+0.7
Republican hold				

Party political offices
Preceded by Melvin Hollowell	Democratic nominee for Michigan Secretary of State; 2006	Succeeded by Jocelyn Benson
