= 2006 Michigan Secretary of State election =

- November 7, 2006
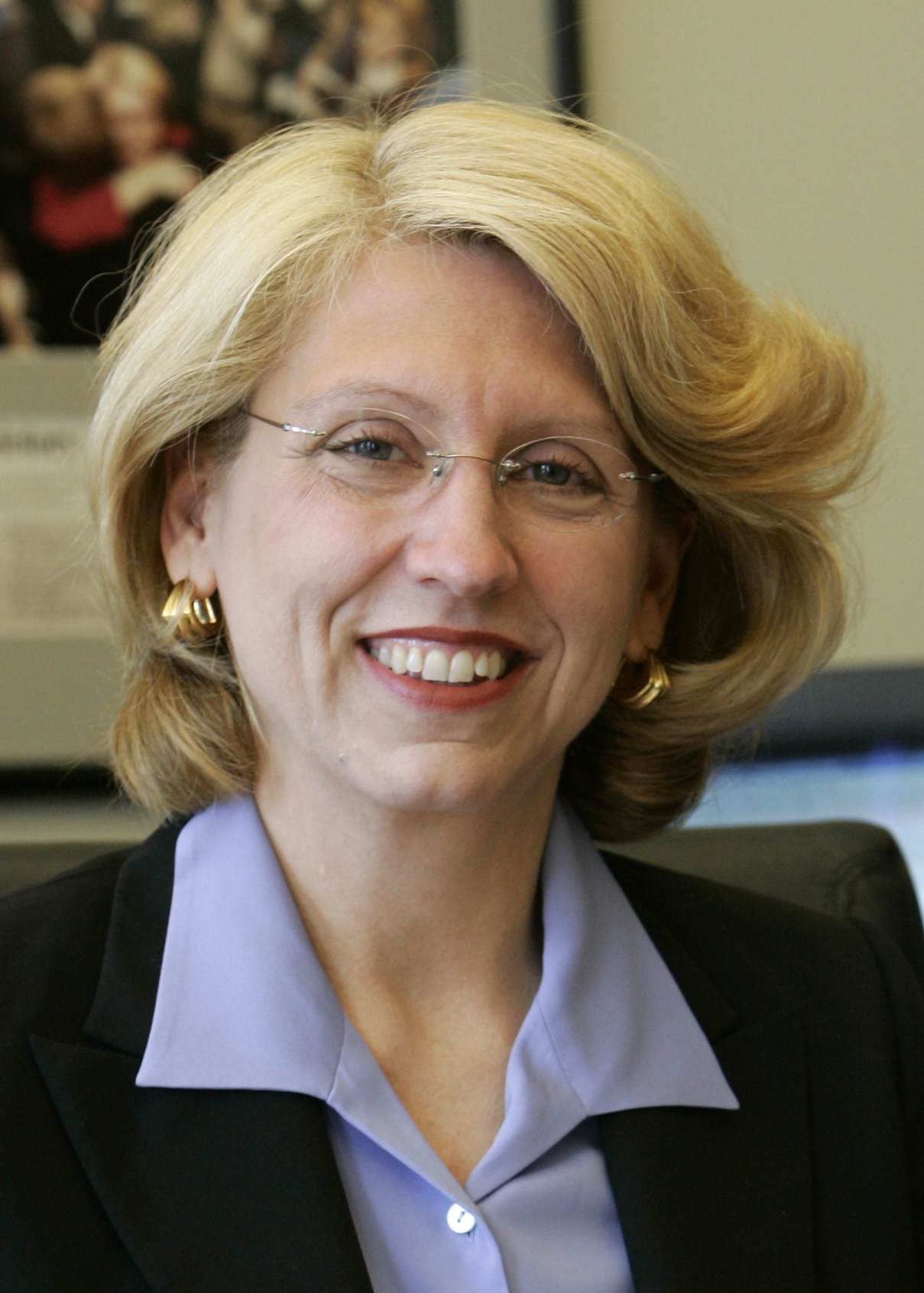

Nominee	Terri Lynn Land	Carmella Sabaugh
Party	Republican	Democratic
Popular vote	2,089,864	1,561,828
Percentage	56.15%	41.96%
- Land: 40–50% 50–60% 60–70% 70–80% 80–90% >90% Sabaugh: 40–50% 50–60% 60–70% 70–80% 80–90% >90% Tie: 40–50% 50% No data
Secretary of State before election
Terri Lynn Land
Republican
Elected Secretary of State
Terri Lynn Land
Republican

The 2006 Michigan Secretary of State election was held on Tuesday, November 7, 2006 to elect the Michigan Secretary of State for a four-year term. Incumbent Republican Terri Lynn Land ran for re-election to a second term.

== Candidates ==
=== Republican Party ===
Incumbent Terri Lynn Land won the party's nomination during the state convention.

=== Democratic Party ===
Macomb County Clerk Carmella Sabaugh won the party's nomination during the state convention.

== Results ==
Michigan Secretary of State election, 2006
Party	Candidate	Votes	%
Republican	Terri Lynn Land (incumbent)	2,089,864	56.15
Democratic	Carmella Sabaugh	1,561,828	41.96
Green	Lynn Meadows	70,218	1.89
Total votes		3,721,910	100
Republican hold			
