= UFP Industries =

American materials company

UFP Industries, Inc.
- Formerly: Universal Forest Products, Inc.
- Company type: Public
- Traded as: Nasdaq: UFPI; S&P 400 component
- Industry: Wood and wood-alternative products Flooring Systems; Trusses; Joists; Wall Panels; Pressure-treated lumber Engineered wood products
- Founded: 1955; 71 years ago
- Headquarters: Grand Rapids, Michigan, U.S.
- Number of locations: 196 Facilities
- Key people: William Currie (Chairman); Will Schwartz (CEO); William Schwartz (President of Retail Solutions); Patrick Webster (president & COO (retired))
- Products: Trim and moulding Lumber and panels Decking, railings, accessories Fencing; Manufactured housing products Industrial packaging Lawn and garden accessories
- Revenue: US$6.32 billion (2025)
- Operating income: US$366 million (2025)
- Net income: US$296 million (2025)
- Total assets: US$4.1 billion (2025)
- Total equity: US$2.6 billion (2025)
- Number of employees: 13,800 (2025)
- Website: ufpi.com
- Footnotes / references Financials as of fiscal year ended December 27, 2025

UFP Industries, Inc. is a holding company that serves three markets: retail, industrial and construction. The company is headquartered in Grand Rapids, Michigan, and has been publicly traded (Nasdaq: UFPI) since 1993. UFP Industries has 218 affiliated operations, which supply tens of thousands of products to three markets: UFP Retail, UFP Construction, and UFP Packaging.

UFP Industries was founded in Michigan in 1955 as a supplier of lumber to the manufactured housing industry. In 2021, the company had over 200 locations in eight countries with 15,000+ employees and sales of $8.6 billion.

The company is listed in the Fortune 1000 list of America's largest corporations as of 2022, and in the 2005 Forbes magazine's Platinum 400 ranking of the best-performing U.S. companies with annual revenue of more than $8 billion.
