= 2004 Oakland County Executive election =

- November 2, 2004

Nominee	L. Brooks Patterson	Art Myatt
Party	Republican	Green
Popular vote	386,923	90,449
Percentage	81.05%	18.95%
Oakland County Executive before election
L. Brooks Patterson
Republican
Elected Oakland County Executive
L. Brooks Patterson
Republican

The 2004 Oakland County Executive election was held on November 2, 2004. Incumbent County Executive L. Brooks Patterson ran for re-election. He won the Republican primary by a wide margin, and faced Green Party nominee Art Myatt, an engineer, in the general election. Patterson defeated Myatt in a landslide, winning 81 percent of the vote.

== Democratic nomination ==
No candidates filed for the Democratic nomination. Travis Reeds, an attorney from South Lyon, attempted to win the party's nomination by mounting a write-in campaign, but did not receive enough votes to win the nomination.

== Republican primary ==
=== Candidates ===
- L. Brooks Patterson, incumbent County Executive
- Eileen Ambrose, West Bloomfield attorney and conservative activist
- Ed Hamilton, Troy engineer, 1996 Democratic nominee for County Executive

=== Polling ===
Poll source	Date(s) administered	Sample size	Margin of error	L. Brooks Patterson	Eileen Ambrose	Ed Hamilton	Undecided
EPIC-MRA	June 29-July 1, 2004	400	5%	72%	6%	2%	20%

=== Results ===
Republican primary results
Party	Candidate	Votes	%
Republican	L. Brooks Patterson (inc.)	65,102	66.30%
Republican	Eileen Ambrose	26,429	26.92%
Republican	Ed Hamilton	6,660	6.78%
Total votes		98,191	100.00%

== General election ==
=== Results ===
2004 Oakland County Executive election
Party	Candidate	Votes	%
Republican	L. Brooks Patterson (inc.)	386,923	81.05%
Green	Art Myatt	90,449	18.95%
Total votes		477,372	100.00%
Republican hold			
