= Tower International =

Automotive parts manufacturer

- Type: Public
- Traded as: NYSE: TOWR; Russell 2000 Component
- Industry: Automotive industry
- Founded: 1993
- Headquarters: Livonia, Michigan, United States
- Number of locations: 29 facilities
- Area served: Worldwide
- Key people: James C. Gouin (CEO); Pelle Malmhagen (President); Michael Rajkovic (COO); Jeff Kersten (Executive VP and CFO)
- Products: -Body structural stampings and assemblies -Chassis structural stampings and assemblies, including full frames and cradles -Suspension components, modules and systems -Exposed sheet metal (Class B) surfaces
- Revenue: US$ 2.0 billion (FY 2017)
- Number of employees: 7,600
- Website: www.towerinternational.com

Tower International is a manufacturer of automotive structural metal components and assemblies primarily serving original equipment manufacturers (“OEMs”). Tower International supply body-structure stampings, frame and other chassis structures, and complex welded assemblies for small and large cars, crossovers, pickups, and sport utility vehicles.

Headquartered in Livonia, Michigan, the company generated revenues of $2.0 billion in 2017. Their products are manufactured at 23 facilities, located near customers in North America and Europe. Tower supports the manufacturing operations through six engineering and sales locations around the world.

== History ==
Tower International was formed in 1993, however many of the engineering and manufacturing operations date back more than a century earlier. In 1877, Samuel Tower along with his sons Isaac Lewis Tower and Ray Jay Tower formed S. Tower & Company in Greenville, Michigan. A machine shop, it grew into what by 1882 was named The R.J.Tower Iron Works. Located near Michigan’s timberlands, the company had its initial success repairing saw mill machinery before designing two products of its own. The Tower Edger (1893) and Tower Trimmer (1894) quickly became essential to timber processing and were sold throughout the United States and foreign countries under the name Gordon Hollow Blast Company. In 1907, Ray Jay Tower and his nephew Samual Tower established a hydro-electric plant to generate power for the City of Greenville. In 1920, R.J.Tower launched Tower Trucks, a line of 1-ton and 1 1/2 ton vehicles designed to compete with the likes of REO and GMC. By the 1930s, R.J.Tower Iron Works had established its sheet metal stamping operations, initially supplying refrigerator and stove manufacturers before it eventually entered the automotive stamping market. A.O. Smith Automotive Products Company, which was acquired by Tower International in 1997, has roots dating back to the early days of the automotive industry. The 1903 Cadillac was produced on the first steel frame which was invented by A.O. Smith. In the 1920s their first fully automatic frame line with adjustable riveting robots became known as a “Mechanical Marvel”. On October 15, 2010, Tower International common stock began trading on the New York Stock Exchange following the initial public offering (“IPO”).

== Products ==
Tower International provides stampings, structures and assemblies.

=== Body Structures ===
Integral components forming the upper-body structure of the vehicle.

=== Class A Products ===
Large stampings which require flawless surface finishes.

=== Chassis Structures ===
Products forming the basic lower-body structure of the vehicle.

=== Complex Assemblies ===
Complex assemblies representing major portions of a vehicle's body structure.

=== Non-Automotive ===
Manufacturing of metal structures for other industries.

== Locations ==
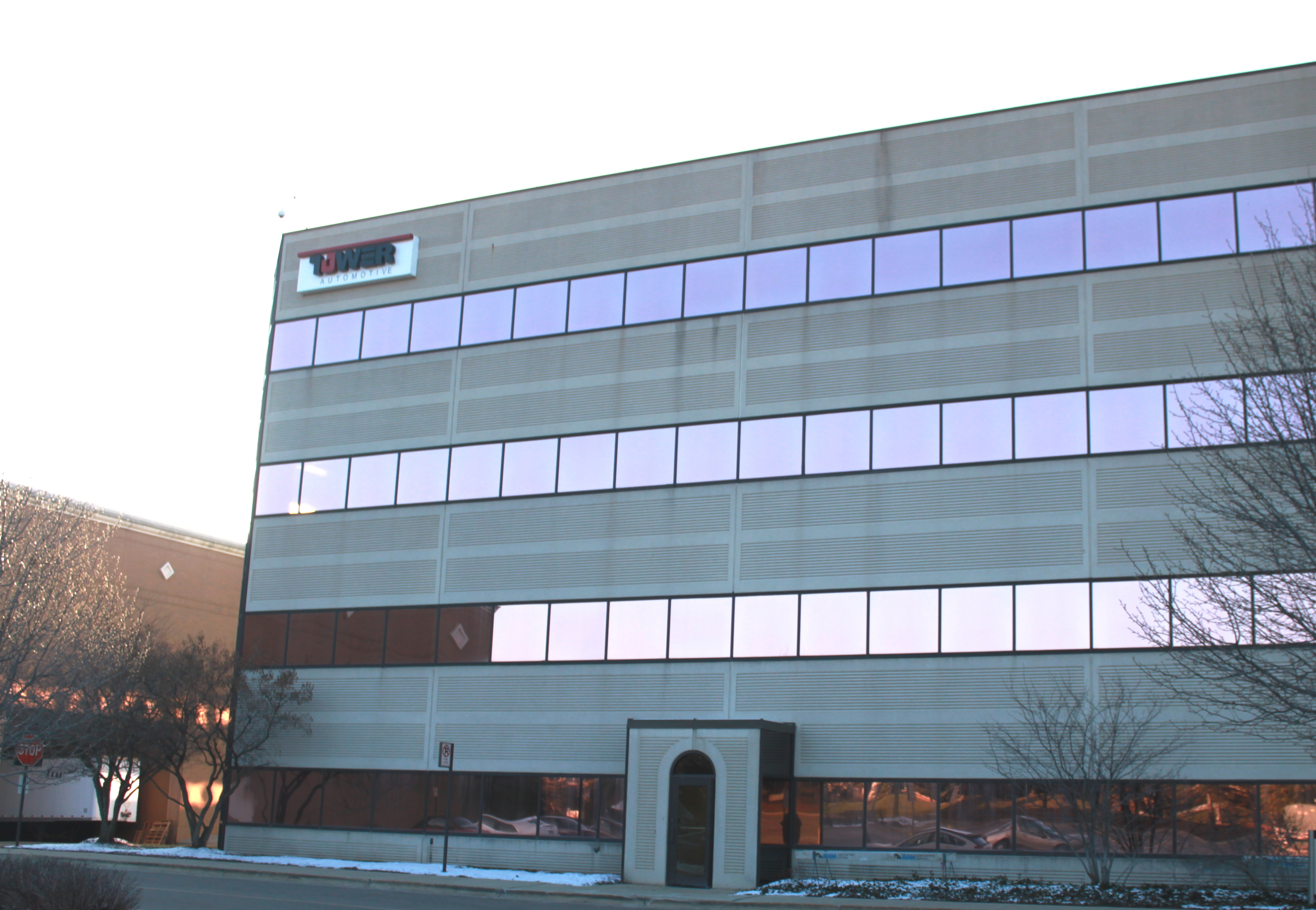
Tower International HQ, Livonia

Tower is headquartered in Livonia, Michigan. The 23 production facilities are supported by 6 engineering and sales locations.
