= Terri Lynn Land =

American politician

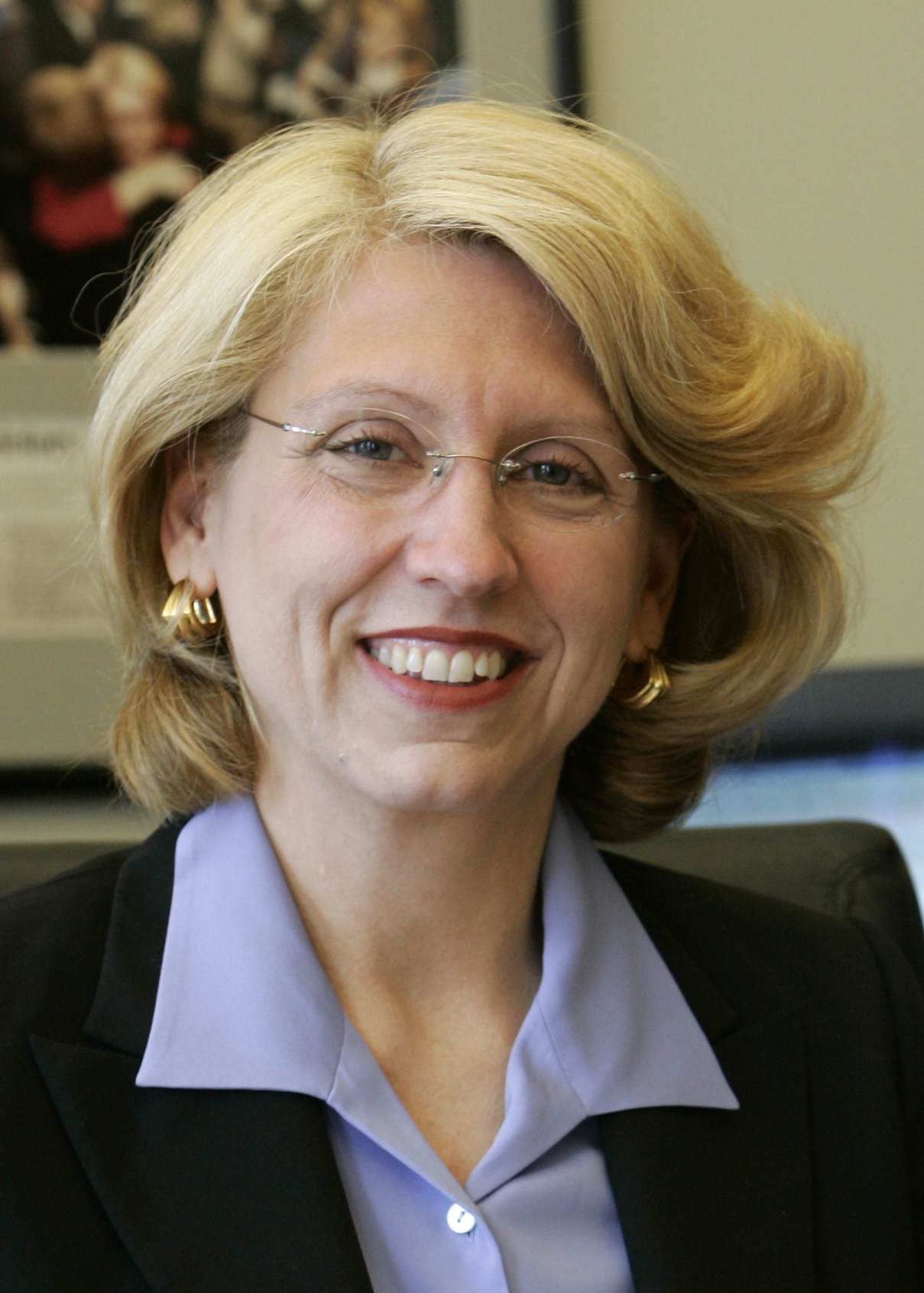

41st Secretary of State of Michigan
- In office January 1, 2003 – January 1, 2011
- Governor: Jennifer Granholm
- Preceded by: Candice Miller
- Succeeded by: Ruth Johnson

Personal details
- Born: June 30, 1958 (age 68) Grand Rapids, Michigan, U.S.
- Party: Republican
- Spouse: Daniel Hibma (m. 1983)
- Children: 2
- Education: Hope College (BA)

Terri Lynn Land (born June 30, 1958) is an American politician who served as the 41st Michigan Secretary of State from 2003 to 2011. A member of the Republican Party, Land was elected to the Republican National Committee in 2012. She was the Republican nominee for the 2014 United States Senate race in Michigan, losing in the general election to Democrat Gary Peters. Land currently serves on the Board of Governors of Wayne State University.

== Early life and education ==
Land was born in Grand Rapids, Michigan. She grew up in Grandville, Michigan, graduating from Grandville High School, and attended Hope College in Holland, Michigan, where she received a Bachelor of Arts in political science. In 2009, Land was awarded an honorary doctorate degree from Davenport University.

== Politics ==
=== Early political career ===
In 1980, Land joined the Grandville Planning Commission. At age 23, Land ran for the Michigan House of Representatives, unsuccessfully challenging incumbent Democrat Jelt Sietsema. From 1992 to 2000, she was the elected Clerk of Kent County, Michigan's fourth-largest county. In 2000, with Governor John Engler's encouragement, Land ran unsuccessfully for the Michigan State Board of Education.

=== Michigan Secretary of State ===
In 2002, Land became Michigan's 41st Secretary of State, defeating Detroit-based attorney Melvin Hollowell 55%–43%, and took office on January 1, 2003. She and her husband contributed more than $1.9 million of their own money to her 2002 and 2006 Secretary of State campaigns.

The Grand Rapids Press editorial board praised Land for her technological transformation of state services, including updates to computer systems; expansion of Web services; consolidation of branch offices and "expanded hours in new, larger locations"; and changes that for the first time allowed Michigan customers to pay fees with credit cards and renew license plate registrations through self-service stations. The Press editorial board wrote that, over the opposition of some Republicans, Land "advocated measures that would expand participation at the polls, including early voting, no-reason absentee voting and early registration for young voters."

In 2005, Land's office announced an effort to use the Help America Vote Act to reduce potential voter fraud by removing names of voters who had died, moved out of Michigan, or changed their names. An investigation by The New York Times found that 33,000 people were removed from the rolls, while Land's office said 11,000 voters were removed. The American Civil Liberties Union (ACLU) took Michigan to court over the removal of voter names. The Times pointed out that similar problems were seen in other states, as "Republican and Democratic election officials ... struggled to interpret new federal laws, such as the Help America Vote Act." In October 2008, a federal judge ruled that the national Voting Rights Act had been violated and six states, including Michigan, were ordered to stop removing names from voter rolls. A spokesperson for Land's office told the Detroit Free Press, "If you're eligible to vote, you will be able to cast a vote on Election Day".

In 2006, Land was reelected, defeating Macomb County Clerk Carmella Sabaugh, 56%–42%. After serving two terms, the maximum allowed in the state, she was succeeded by Republican Ruth Johnson.

=== 2010 gubernatorial race ===
After exploring a bid for Michigan governor in 2010, Land decided not to run in June 2009, instead endorsing Mike Bouchard. She ran for lieutenant governor on a ticket with Bouchard the following year, but lost in the Republican primary.

=== 2014 U.S. Senate election ===
On June 3, 2013, Land announced her candidacy for the United States Senate in 2014. She ran unopposed in the primary and faced Democratic congressman Gary Peters in the general election.

According to an early analysis by The Washington Post, the U.S. Senate election in Michigan was considered one of the top 10 Senate races of 2014. Land outraised Peters throughout the campaign. Her largest independent backer was Americans for Prosperity, which spent $3.6 million in support of her candidacy.

In 2014, Land gave $3 million to her own campaign, saying, "You can't ask other people to invest in you if you don't invest in yourself." In her federal financial disclosure form, she had not listed any bank accounts or other assets in her control worth that much. Her campaign said that it had mistakenly failed to disclose a joint account she had with her husband. A Detroit Free Press review of financial disclosure forms showed Land and her husband had assets worth $35 million in 2014, with $1.5 million belonging to Land, and that "candidates may typically tap liberally into joint accounts with their spouses."

In May 2014, Land gave a speech at the Mackinac Policy Conference, a three-day event that many of the state's top business and civic leaders attend, which she read from notes. Following her speech, Land was swarmed by reporters and, unable to articulate a response to a question, pushed their microphones away, saying, "I can't do this."

Land was endorsed by the entire Michigan Republican delegation, as well as former congressman Pete Hoekstra, and the Family Research Council.

Her campaign was weighed down by various missteps and her reluctance to make public campaign appearances, particularly after the event in May. Peters opened up a consistent lead in the polls beginning in September. The Republican establishment effectively gave up on Land's campaign the following month. In the November 4 general election, Land received 41.3% of the vote to Peters's 54.6%.

=== Voting rights lawsuit ===
In September 2020, Land filed a lawsuit against Secretary of State Jocelyn Benson for allowing votes postmarked before Election Day to be counted after Election Day.

=== 2020 Wayne State University Board of Governors election ===
In September 2020, the Michigan Republican Party was required by law to withdraw its nomination of Diane Dunaskiss for the Wayne State University Board of Governors due to Dunaskiss's failure to pay a 2018 campaign fee. In an emergency state committee session, Land replaced Dunaskiss as the party's nominee. On November 3, 2020, Land was elected to an 8-year term on the board of governors.

2020 Michigan Fake Electors Case

As revealed by documents from the Federal Government retrieved via a FOIA request, Terri Lynn Land was listed as a fake elector for Donald Trump during the 2020 presidential election, but declined to attend, and was replaced by Ken Thompson.

== Personal life ==
Land married Dan Hibma in 1983. They live in Byron Center and have two children. According to financial disclosures, Land and her family have assets worth at least $34 million.

== Electoral history ==
Governor of Wayne State University Election 2020
Party	Candidate	Votes	%	±%
Democratic	Eva Garza Dewaelsche	2,343,395	24.18	
Democratic	Shirley Stancato	2,352,785	24.28	
Republican	Don Gates	2,291,880	23.65	
Republican	Terri Lynn Land	2,368,966	24.45	
Libertarian	Jon Elgas	126,102	1.3	
U.S. Taxpayers	Christine C. Schwartz	106,274	1.1	
Green	Susan Odgers	99,953	1.03	
	Lloyd Arthur Conway	386	0	

U. S. Senate Election in Michigan 2014
Party	Candidate	Votes	%	±%
Democratic	Gary Peters	1,704,936	54.6	−8.1
Republican	Terri Lynn Land	1,290,199	41.3	+7.5
Libertarian	Jim Fulner	62,897	2.0	+.4
Green	Chris Wahmhoff	26,137	0.9	0
U.S. Taxpayers	Richard Matkin	37,529	1.2	+.6
	Write-Ins	77	0.0	0
Majority		414,737		
Turnout		3,121,775		
Democratic hold		Swing		

Michigan Secretary of State Election 2006
Party	Candidate	Votes	%	±%
Republican	Terri Lynn Land (incumbent)	2,089,864	56.15	
Democratic	Carmella Sabaugh	1,561,828	41.96	

Michigan Secretary of State Election 2002
Party	Candidate	Votes	%	±%
Republican	Terri Lynn Land	1,703,261	54.96	
Democratic	Melvin Hollowell	1,331,441	42.96	

Party political offices
Preceded by Candice Miller	Republican nominee for Secretary of State of Michigan; 2002, 2006	Succeeded by Ruth Johnson
Preceded by Jack Hoogendyk	Republican nominee for U.S. Senator from Michigan (Class 2); 2014	Succeeded by John E. James
Political offices
Preceded by Candice Miller	Secretary of State of Michigan; 2003–2011	Succeeded by Ruth Johnson
