= 2007 in Michigan =

- Decades: 1980s; 1990s; 2000s; 2010s; 2020s
- See also: History of Michigan; Historical outline of Michigan; List of years in Michigan; 2007 in the United States

This article reviews 2007 in Michigan, including the state's major office holders, performance of its sports teams, a chronology of the state's top news and sports stories, and notable Michigan-related births and deaths.

== Overview ==
The top news stories in Michigan in 2007 included:

- A continued downturn in the state's economy, as Michigan led the nation in unemployment.
- The sale of Chrysler from Daimler to Cerberus Capital Management.
- Comerica's decision to move its headquarters to Dallas, after over 150 years in Detroit.
- Quicken Loans' decision to move its headquarters to downtown Detroit.
- The UAW reached new contracts with General Motors (GM), Chrysler, and Ford after short strikes at GM and Chrysler plants. The new contracts shifted health care burdens to union-run trusts and allowed the companies to pay lower wages to new hires.
- Pfizer's closure of its Ann Arbor research and development center with the loss of 2,100 jobs.
- Debate over moving the state's 2008 presidential primary to January 15. The national parties retaliated against Michigan's decision by taking away delegates, and half the Democratic candidates removed their names from the Michigan ballot.
- The trial in the whistle-blower lawsuit brought by Detroit's former police chief and a mayoral bodygard claiming retaliation by Kwame Kilpatrick.
- Murder of Laura Dickinson: The December 2006 murder of an Eastern Michigan University student in her dormitory room led to the firing of the university's president and police chief for covering up facts relating to the murder and the conviction of fellow student Orange Taylor III.

The state's top sports stories included:

- The Detroit Red Wings retiring Steve Yzerman's jersey. The 2006–07 Red Wings, playing without Yzerman for the first time in two decades, compiled a 50–19–13 record and advanced to the Western Conference Finals where they lost to the Anaheim Ducks.
- The Detroit Pistons compiling a 53-29 record and advancing to the Eastern Conference Finals where they lost to the Cleveland Cavaliers as LeBron James scored 48 points in Game 5.
- Detroit Tigers right fielder Magglio Ordóñez led the American League with a .363 batting average and 54 doubles and finished second in the MVP voting.
- The Detroit Lions starting the season with a 6-2 record, then losing seven of their last eight games for their seventh sonsecutive losing season.
- The 2006–07 Michigan State hockey team winning the national championship in the Frozen Four.
- The 2007 Michigan Wolverines football team losing its season opener in the infamous Appalachian State game and then rebouding to defeat Notre Dame, Penn State, Michigan State, and Florida for a final record of 9–4. Lloyd Carr retired at the season, and Rich Rodriguez was hired to replace him.
- The hiring of Mark Dantonio as Michigan State's head football coach. The 2007 Spartans advanced to a bowl game for the first time since 2003; Dantonio led the Spartans for 13 seasons, compiling a 114–57 record.
- The Detroit Shock had the best record in the WNBA but lost to the Phoenix Mercury in the WNBA Finals.

Notable Michigan-related deaths included former U.S. President Gerald Ford, former General Motors CEO Roger Smith, former Congressman Guy Vander Jagt, actress, singer, and dancer Betty Hutton, and jazz musician Alice Coltrane.

== Office holders ==
=== State office holders ===
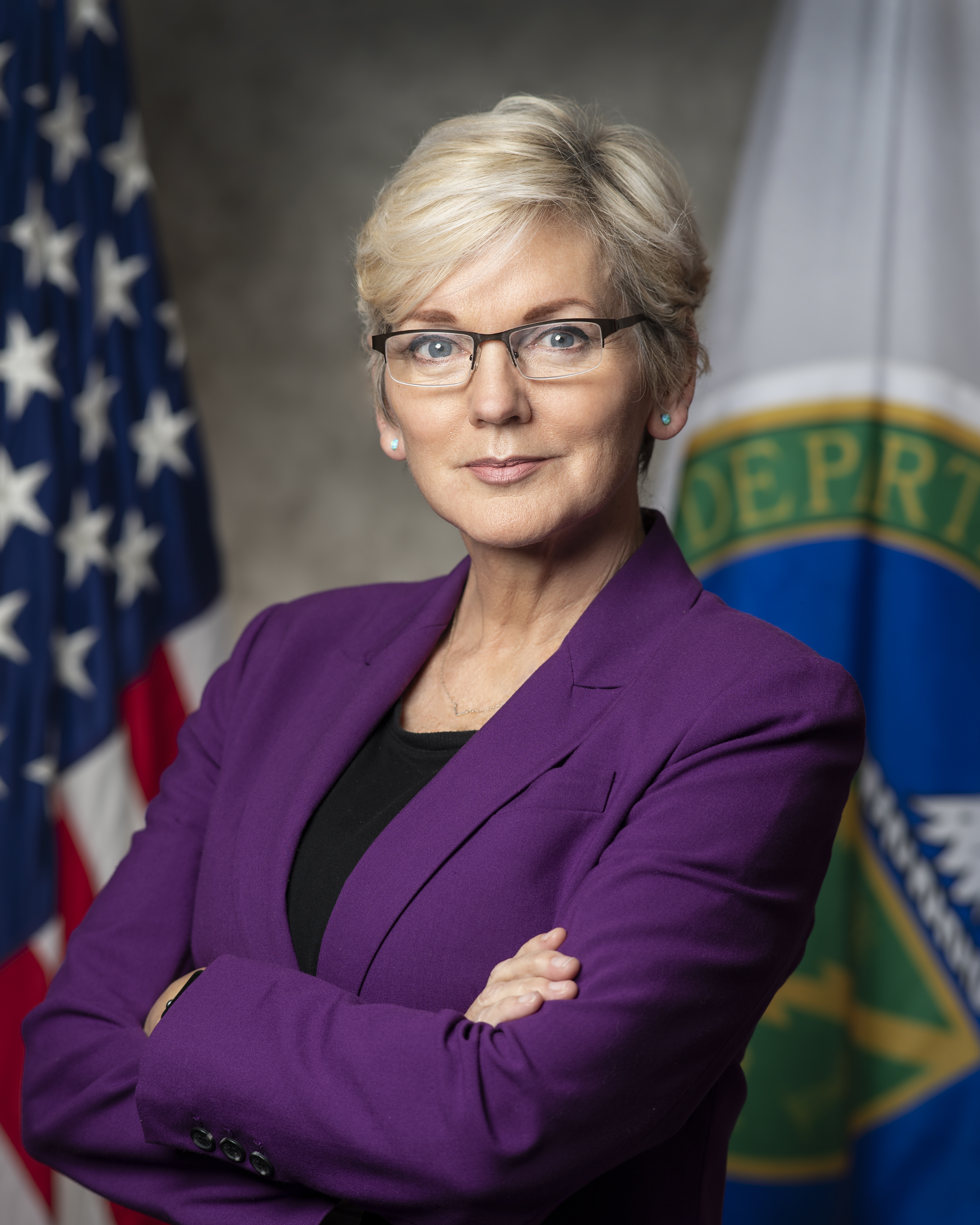
Jennifer Granholm

- Governor of Michigan – Jennifer Granholm (Democrat)
- Lieutenant Governor of Michigan: John D. Cherry (Democrat)
- Michigan Attorney General – Mike Cox (Republican)
- Michigan Secretary of State – Terri Lynn Land (Republican)
- Speaker of the Michigan House of Representatives: Andy Dillon (Democrat)
- Majority Leader of the Michigan Senate: Mike Bishop (Republican)
- Chief Justice, Michigan Supreme Court: Clifford Taylor

=== Federal office holders ===
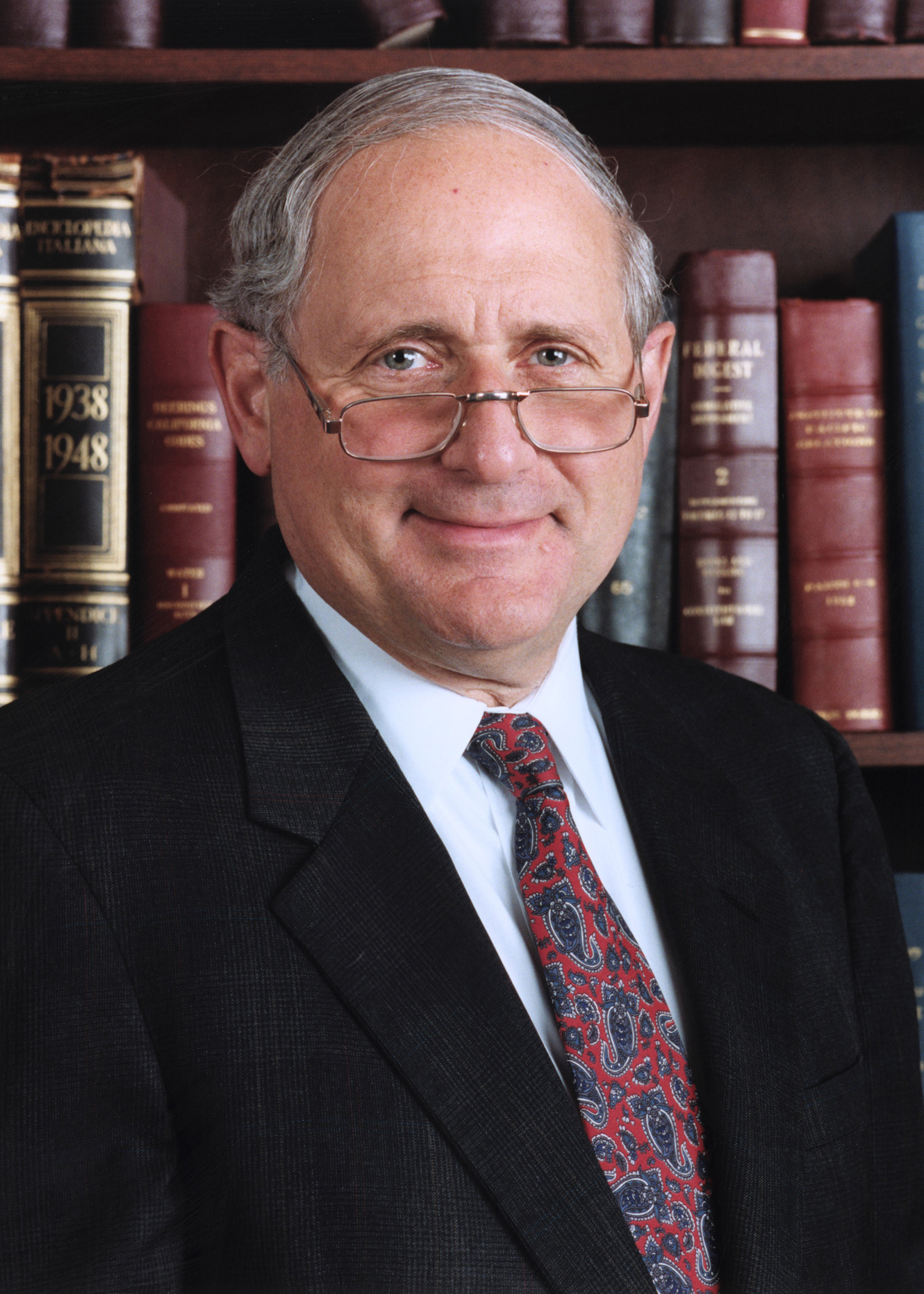
Carl Levin

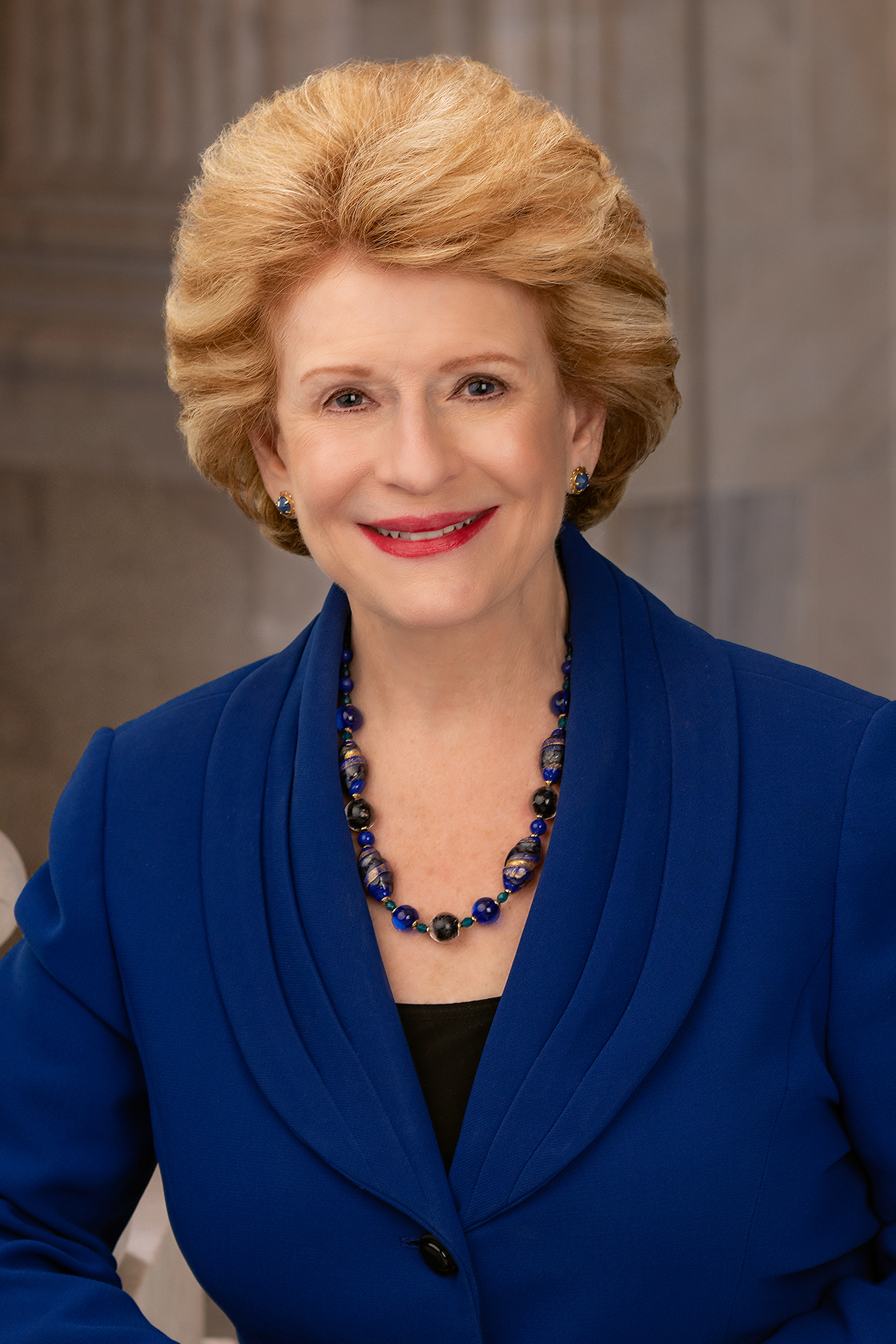
Debbie Stabenow

- U.S. senator from Michigan: Debbie Stabenow (Democrat])
- U.S. senator from Michigan: Carl Levin (Democrat)

=== Mayors of major cities ===
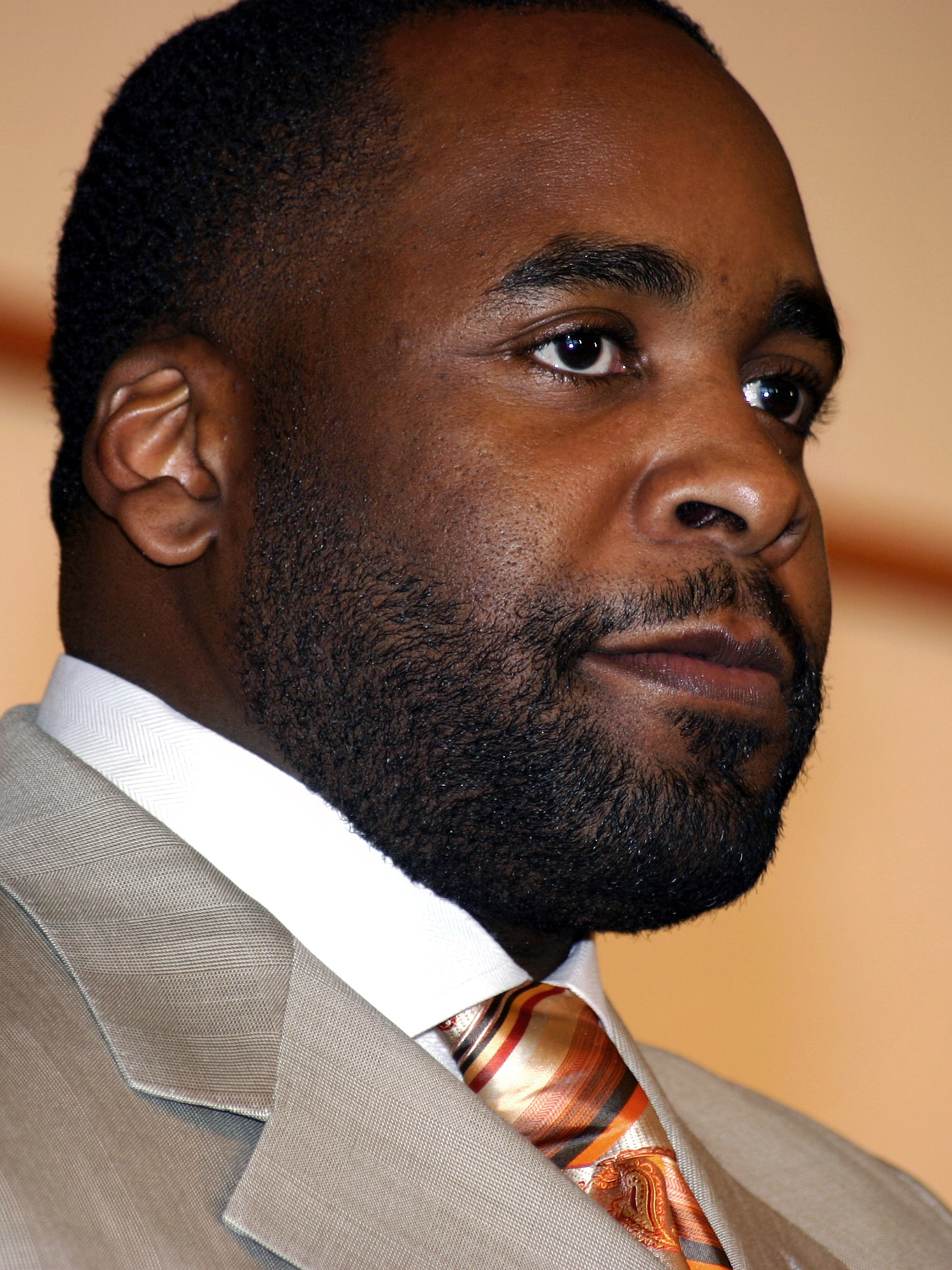
Kwame Kilpatrick

- Mayor of Detroit: Kwame Kilpatrick (Democrat)
- Mayor of Grand Rapids: George Heartwell
- Mayor of Ann Arbor: John Hieftje (Democrat)
- Mayor of Lansing: Antonio Benavides
- Mayor of Flint: Virgil Bernero
- Mayor of Saginaw: Carol B. Cottrell/Joyce J. Seals

== Sports ==
=== Baseball ===
- 2007 Detroit Tigers season – In their second season under manager Jim Leyland, the Tigers compiled an 88–74 record and finished in second place in the American League Central. Right fielder Magglio Ordóñez led the American League with a .363 batting average and 54 doubles and finished second in the MVP voting. He also led the Tigers with 28 home runs and 139 RBIs. Pitcher Justin Verlander pitched a no-hitter on June 12.

=== American football ===
- 2007 Detroit Lions season – In their second season under head coach Rod Marinelli, the Lions began the season with a 6–2 record, then lost seven of their last eight games for a 7–9 overall record. It was the team's seventh sonsecutive losing season. The Lions' defense also set an NFL record by surrendering 422 pass completions. The team's statistical leaders included Jon Kitna (4,068 passing yards), Kevin Jones (581 rushing yards), and Shaun McDonald (943 receiving yards).
- 2007 Michigan Wolverines football team – In their final season under head coach Lloyd Carr, the Wolverines lost their season opener in the infamous Appalachian State game. They later won eight straight games and defeated No. 9 Florida in the Capital One Bowl, for a final record of 9–4. The team's statistical leaders included Chad Henne (1,938 passing yards), Mike Hart (1,361 rushing yards), and Mario Manningham (1,174 receiving yards). Carr retired at the season, and Rich Rodriguez was hired to replace him.
- 2007 Michigan State Spartans football team – In their first season under head coach Mark Dantonio, the Spartans compiled a 7–6 record and advanced to a bowl game (the 2007 Champs Sports Bowl) for the first time since 2003. The team's statistical leaders included Brian Hoyer (2,725 passing yards), Javon Ringer (1,447 rushing yards), and Devin Thomas (1,260 receiving yards).

=== Basketball ===
- 2006–07 Detroit Pistons season – The Pistons compiled a 53-29 record and advanced to the Eastern Conference Finals where they lost to the Cleveland Cavaliers as LeBron James scored 48 points in Game 5. The Pistons' statistical leaders for the season included Richard Hamilton (1,485 points), Chauncey Billups (502 assists), and Rasheed Wallace (543 total rebounds, 118 blocks).
- 2007 Detroit Shock season – Led by coach Bill Laimbeer, the Shock compiled a 24–10 (.706) record and advanced to the 2007 WNBA Finals where they lost to the Phoenix Mercury. Deanna Nolan led the team with 553 points scored and 132 assists. Plenette Pierson led the team in rebounds with 197 and in blocks with 29.
- 2006–07 Michigan State Spartans men's basketball team – In their 12th season under head coach Tom Izzo, the Sparatns compiled a 23–12 record. They advanced to the second round of the NCAA tournament, losing to No. 1 North Carolina. The team's statistical leaders included Drew Neitzel (635 points), Travis Walton (191 assists), and Goran Suton (235 rebounds).
- 2006–07 Michigan Wolverines men's basketball team – In their sixth and final season under head coach Tommy Amaker, the Wolverines compiled a 22–13 record. The team's statistical leaders included Dion Harris (469 points, 127 assists), Courtney Sims (218 rebounds), and Ekpe Udoh (67 blocks).

=== Ice hockey ===
- 2006–07 Detroit Red Wings season – The team compiled a 50–19–13 record and advanced to the Western Conference Finals where they lost to the Anaheim Ducks. The team's statistical leaders were Pavel Datsyuk (60 assists, 87 points) and Henrik Zetterberg (33 goals). Dominik Hašek led the tam with 38 wins in goal and a .913 save percentage.
- 2006–07 Michigan State Spartans men's ice hockey season – In their fifth season under head coach Rick Comley, the Spartans compiled a 26–13–3 record and won the NCAA national championship, defeating Boston College in the championship game of the Frozen Four. Key players included Justin Abdelkader.

=== Auto racing ===
- 2007 3M Performance 400
- 2007 Citizens Bank 400
- 2007 Detroit Indy Grand Prix
- 2007 Detroit Sports Car Challenge
- 2007 Firestone Indy 400

== Chronology of events ==
=== January ===
- January 2 – The Detroit Red Wings retired Steve Yzerman's jersey No. 19 in a 90-minute ceremony in front of a sellout crowd at Joe Louis Arena.
- January 7 – On the first day of the North American International Auto Show, General Motors won car and truck of the year honors and unveiled its electric Volt concept.
- January 22 – Pfizer announced it would close its Ann Arbor research and development center. The closure resulted in the loss of 2,100 jobs.
- January 25 – Ford Motor Co. announced a record loss of $12.6 billion for 2006.

=== February ===
- February 14 – Daimler Chrylser announced its intention to sell Chrysler.

=== March ===
- March 6 – Comerica announced it would relocate its headquarters from Detroit to Dallas. Formerly Detroit Bank and Trust, the company had been based in Detroit since its founding in 1849.

=== April ===
- April 1 – World Wrestling Entertainment holds WrestleMania 23 at Ford Field in Detroit, drawing a crowd of 80,103.
- April 7 – The 2006–07 Michigan State Spartans men's ice hockey season won the NCAA ice hockey championship, defeating Boston College in the championship game of the Frozen Four.

=== May ===
- May 14 – A New York private equity firm, Cerberus Capital Management, purchased Chrysler from DaimlerChrysler AG.

=== June ===
- June 1 – Jack Kevorkian, at age 79, was released on parole after serving eight years in Michigan's Lakeland Correctional Facility for second-degree murder. He promised not to assist any suicides as a condition of his parole. He was greeted on his release by 60 Minutes correspondent Mike Wallace.
- June 4 – A twin-engine Cessna airplane carrying a University of Michigan medical team crashed into Lake Michigan while returning from Milwaukee with a lung harvested from a donor patient to save the life of a critically-ill patient in Ann Arbor. All six on board the plane died.
- June 12 – Justin Verlander threw a no-hitter, the first by a Tigers pitcher at home since Virgil Trucks in 1952.

=== July ===
- July 26 – After losing $12.6 billion in 2006, Ford announced a $750 million profit for the second quarter of 2007. It was the first quarterly profit for Ford in two years.

=== August ===
- August 3 – Cerberus Capital Management closed its acquisition of Chrysler, investing $7.4 billion to acquire 80.1% of Chrysler Group from Daimler Chrysler AG. Daimler retained 19.1% of Chrysler.
- August 5 – Cerberus named former Home Depot boss Bob Nardelli as Chrysler's new CEO. Former CEO Thomas W. LaSorda became the No. 2 executive as vice chairman and president.
- August 2–7 – The Sleeper Lakes Fire north of Newberry in the Upper Peninsula burned 18,500 acres between August 2 and August 7, making it the largest forest fire in Michigan since 1999.
- August 18 – Woodward Dream Cruise
- August 22 – The Michigan Senate voted with a large majority to move Michigan's presidential primary to January 15. The bill was then approved by a large majority in the Michigan House and signed by Gov. Jennifer Granholm.
- August 24 – Geoffrey Fieger and his law partner were charged with making $127,000 in illegal campaign contributions through straw donors to the 2004 John Edwards presidential campaign.

=== September ===
- September 1 – 2007 Appalachian State vs. Michigan football game: In its opening game of the 2007 season, Michigan was upset, 34-32, by Division I-AA Appalachian State in what has been regarded as one of the biggest upsets in sports history.
- September 26 – Following a two-day strike, General Motors and the UAW agreed to a new contract.
- September 30 – Detroit Tigers right fielder Magglio Ordóñez won the American League batting title.

=== October ===
- October 1 – Michigan state government shut down for one day due to legislators failing to come to an agreement to cut expenses.
- October 2 – The Michigan legislature passed a new sales tax on services. The new law was unpopular and was repealed less than two months later on December 1.
- October 10 – After a six-hour strike, Chrysler reached a new contract with the UAW.
- October 23 – The judge declared a mistrial in the case of Orange Taylor III for the murder of Laura Dickinson. Taylor was accused of raping and murdering Dickinson, a 22-year-old Eastern Michigan University student from the small town of Hastings who was also a member of the school's crew team and hoped to serve in the Peace Corps. The attack took place in Dickinson's dormitory room in December 2006. The jury split with 10 voting guilty and two voting to acquit. A retrial was set for January 2008. The failure to convict was met with disbelief in Dickinson's hometown. On retrial in 2008, a second jury convicted Taylor of first-degree felony murder, assault with intent to commit sexual penetration, home invasion and larceny.

Separately, the university was accused of covering up facts relating to Dickinson's on-campus murder, resulting in the firing of the university's president and the university police chief and a $2 million payment to Dickinson's family and estate.

=== November ===
- November 1 – Chrysler announced plans to eliminate one in three jobs at the company, a reduction of 12,100 workers. This was in addition to 13,000 jobs cut in February. Chrysler had 82,400 workers at the end of 2006, and the new layoffs would bring the company's workforce to 57,300 by 2009. The announcement was made five days after the UAW ratified a new labor contract with Chrysler.
- November 3 – Ford reached a new four-year labor agreement with the UAW. Ford agreed to spare, at least temporarily, as many as six of the 16 plants that had been scheduled for closure. In exchange, the UAW agreed to lower pay for new hires, creation of a union-run trust to manage retiree health care costs, the latter move allowing Ford to remove approximately $22 billion in liabilities from its balance sheet.
- November 3 – Michigan defeated Michigan State, 28-24, in their annual rivalry game.
- November 7 – General Motors announced a $39-billion quarterly loss, the largest loss in the company's history. The loss resulted from a book-keeping writeoff relating to a tax law.
- November 7 – In a gruesome thrill killing, Daniel Sorensen of River Rouge, age 26, was lured by Jean Pierre Orlewicz from Plymouth, age 17, to his grandfather's garage in Canton Township. Orlewicz then stabbed Sorensen in the back and cut his neck, stripped the body to underwear, cut off the head with a hacksaw, used a blowtorch to burn fingers and toew to conceal the victim's identity. An accomplice, Alexander Letkemann from West land, age 18, testified against Orlewicz. Orlewicz and Letkemann were both charged with the murder.
- November: Court rulings on Michigan's January 15 primary. Michigan's August decision to move its primary forward in the process was met with controversy. Democrats Barack Obama and John Edwards had previously announced that they would not agree to be included on a January 15 Michigan ballot in deference to national party rules that forbade Michigan from setting a primary date prior to February 5. National parties had also threatened to deprive Michigan of delegates at the national convention if it proceeded with its January 15 primary. In November, the courts issued their rulings:

- November 7 – Ingham County Circuit Court Judge William Collette ruled that Michigan's law passed in August to advance its presidential primary to January 15 was unconstitutional.
- On November 15, a divided Michigan Court of Appeal affirmed the Circuit Court's ruling finding the January 15 primary unconsitutional.
- On November 21, the Michigan Supreme Court in a 4-3 decision granted a stay of execution, allowing Michigan to proceed with its January 15 primary.

- November 8 – Ford announced a third-quarter loss of $380 million, a better-than-expected result. CEO Alan Mulally told analysts and reporters that, despite having already cut 44,000 jobs, job cuts were not over.
- November 10 – The Detroit Institute of Arts re-opened after a six-year, $158-million renovation with a gala party that grossed an estimated $4 million. The museum then opened to the public on November 23, the day after Thanksgiving, with 32 straight hours of fee admission.
- November 13 – Chairman Dan Gilbert of Quicken Loans and Rock Financial announced that the company would move its headquarters and 4,000 employees from Livonia to downtown Detroit.
- November 13 – Nada Nadim Prouty pleaded guilty in Detroit to charges of using her position at the FBI and CIA to search a classified computer system to determine whether relatives, including La Shish owner Talal Chahine, were being investigated. She was also alleged to have paid a Downriver man to engage in a fraudulent marriage to allow her to secure US citizenship. The one-time restaurant at La Shish restaurant in Dearborn became an FBI agent and later a covert CIA operative in a span of about eight years.
- November 14 – The EPA issued an emergency cleanup order for the Saginaw River in Saginaw and warned against eating fish from the river after a dioxin hotspot was discovered in river-bottom sediment near Wickes Park, a location popular for fishing. A Dow Chemical plant in Midland was identified as the likely source of the dioxin.
- November 19 – Lloyd Carr announced his retirement as Michigan's head football coach, effective after Michigan's New Year's Day bowl game.
- November 28 – The MotorCity Casino Hotel opened in Detroit.

=== December ===
- December 1 – Gov. Jennifer Granholm signed a bill repealing the recently-enacted Michigan service tax. The bill provided for rebates to anyone who had already paid the tax.
- December 4 – The Detroit Tigers made a multi-player trade that brought Miguel Cabrera to Detroit from the Florida Marlins. The Tigers sent six young players, including Andre Miller and Cameron Maybin, to the Marlins in exchange for Cabrera and pitcher Dontrelle Willis.
- December 13 – Congress passed legislation requiring automakers to reach an average fuel efficiency of 35 miles per gallon by 2020. John Dingell of Michigan played a key role in negotiating a compromise that led to passage.
- December 17 – Rich Rodriguez was introduced as Michigan's new head football coach.
- December 21 – A Macomb County jury convicted Stephen Grant of second-degree murder in the strangulation death of his wife, Tara Grant. The defendant amitted killing his wife, but claimed the act was not premeditated. Prosecutors had asked the jury to convict him of first-degree murder.
- December 27 – US Census figures were released showing that Michigan and Rhode Island were the only two states to lose population in 2007. Michigan was the leader, losing 0.8% of its population.
- December 28 – Michigan State lost to Boston College in the Champs Sports Bowl.

== Births ==
- February 9 – Henry Brzustewicz, hockey player, in Washington, Michigan
- May 23 – Chloe Ricketts, soccer player, in Dexter, Michigan
- June 25 – Katie Hettinger, stock car racing driver, in Dryden, Michigan
- July 6 – Amariyanna Copeny, youth activist known for raising awareness of Flint water crisis, in Flint, Michigan
- August 6 – Lilia Cosman, artistic gymnast, in Lansing, Michigan
- August 19 – Bryce Underwood, quarterback, No. 1 recruit nationally in 2025 college football recruiting class, in Detroit
- October 17 – Tristan Brown, soccer player, in Novi, Michigan
- December 30 – Chase Reid, hockey player, in Chesterfield, Michigan

== Deaths ==
- January 4 – Rachel Boone Keith, medical doctor, civil rights activist, and wife of Damon Keith, at age 82
- January 6 – Sneaky Pete Kleinow, country-rock musician, at age 72
- January 20 – Anatol Rapoport, mathematical psycohologist and game theorist, professor at U-M 1955-1970 and co-founcer of Mental Health Research Institute, at age 95
- January 20 – Vern Ruhle, Detroit Tigers pitcher (1974–77), at age 55
- January 23 – Disco D, record producer and composer, helped popularize the Detroit electronic music called "Ghettotech", at age 26 by suicide
- February 1 – Douglas Woodruff Hillman, US District Court judge (1979–1991), at age 84
- February 13 – Harold M. Ryan, US Congress (1962–65), at age 96
- February 13 – Heather MacAllister, fat acceptance activist, at age 38
- February 22 – Lucille Farrier Stickel, wildlife toxicologist whose research on the pesticide DDT helped form the basis for Rachel Carson's book Silent Spring, at age 92
- March 12 – Betty Hutton, actress, singer, dancer, and Battle Creek native, at age 86
- March 12 – Arthur Valpey, end at Michigan (1935–37), head coach at Harvard (1948–49)/UConn (1950–51), at age 91
- March 14 – Lloyd Eaton, head football coach at Alma (1949–55), Northern Michigan (1956), Wyoming (1962–70), at age 88
- March 21 – Fred Baer, fullback and MVP of 1954 Michigan football team, at age 74
- March 31 – Clarence Peaks, running back for Michgian State (1954–56), at age 71
- April 19 – H. Richard Crane, physicist who invented the Race Track Synchroton and received National Medal of Science, at age 99
- April 19 – George Webster, Michigan State linebacker (1964–66), College Football Hall of Fame, at age 61
- April 24 – Robert M. Warner, Archivist of the United States (1980–85), at age 78
- April 24 – Warren Avis, founded Avis Car Rentals in 1946, at age 91
- April 24 – Lawson J. Deming, Sir Graves Ghastly on local Detroit television, at age 93 or 94
- April 27 – Walter Joseph Schoenherr, auxilary archbishop of Detroit (1968–1995), at age 87
- May 3 – Alex Agase, 2x consensus football All-American (1941, 1946), assistant coach at U-M (1982–87), athletic director at Eastern Michigan (1977–1982), at age 85
- May 7 – Shirl Conway, Emmy-nominated actress for The Nurses, at age 90
- May 18 – Dan Boisture, head football coach Eastern MIchigan (1967–73), Detroit Wheels (1974), at age 82
- June 22 – Guy Vander Jagt, US Congress (1966-1993), at age 75
- July 20 – Bill Flemming, television sports journalist, one of the original announcers for ABC's Wide World of Sports, at age 80
- August 11 – Wolf Hilbertz, futurist architect, inventor and marine scientist, at age 69
- August 27 – Alice Coltrane, jazz musician, composer, and Hindu spiritual leader, at age 69
- August 31 – Stanley Marion Garn, human biologist/anthropogist at University of Michigan, known for his work in racial classification, at age 84
- September 16 – Buster Ramsey, Detroit Lions defensive coordinator (1952–59)
- September 16 – Shakey Jake, street musician and story teller in Ann Arbor, at age 82
- September 21 – Carl Eugene Watts, serial killer, at age 53
- October 11 – Elizabeth Sparks Adams, 54 years on the Michigan Historical Commission, making her the longest-serving public official in Michigan history, at age 95
- October 30 – Karen Fraction, actress who was featured in seaQuest 2032, at age 49
- November 3 – Ryan Shay, long-distance runner and Ypsilanti native, collpased during Olympic trials and died at age 28
- November 19 – Milo Radulovich, Air Force officer who was accused in the 1950s of bineg a security risk because his father and sister were accused of Communist sympathies, at age 81
- November 23 – Robert Vesco, criminal financier and Detroit native, at age 71
- November 29 – Roger Smith, CEO of General Motors (1981-1990), main subject of Roger & Me, at age 82
- November 29 – David Slepian, mathematician, at age 84
- December 17 – Jack Zander, animator, at age 99
- December 29 – Dave Middleton, Detroit Lions (1955–60), at age 74
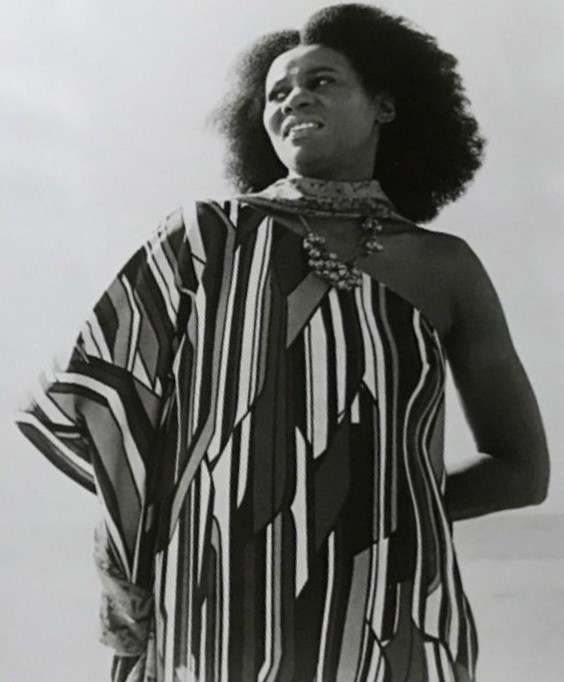
Alice Coltrane

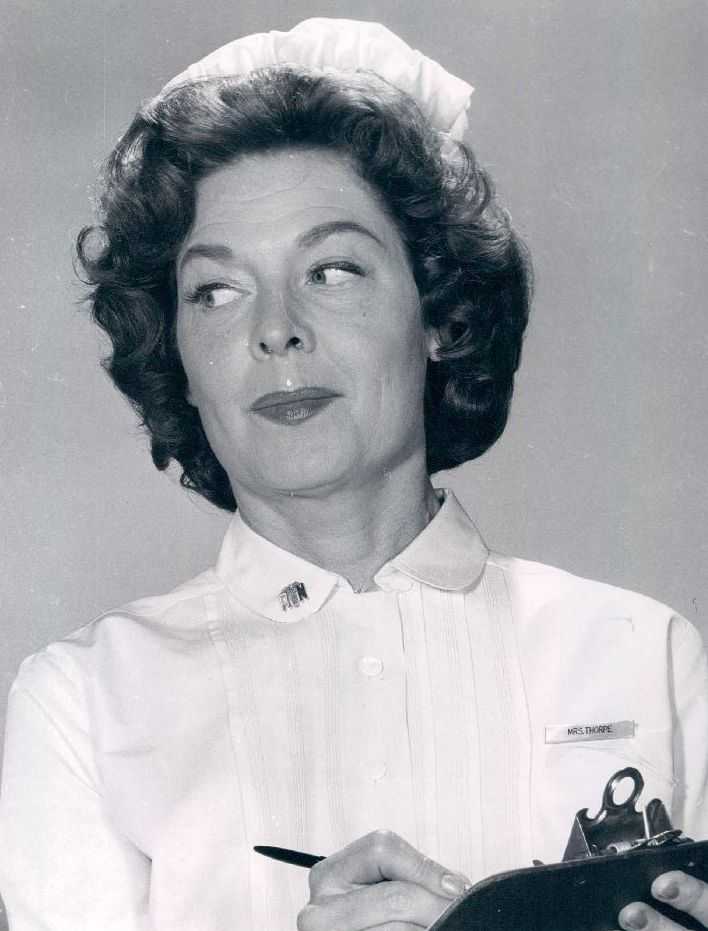
Shirl Conway

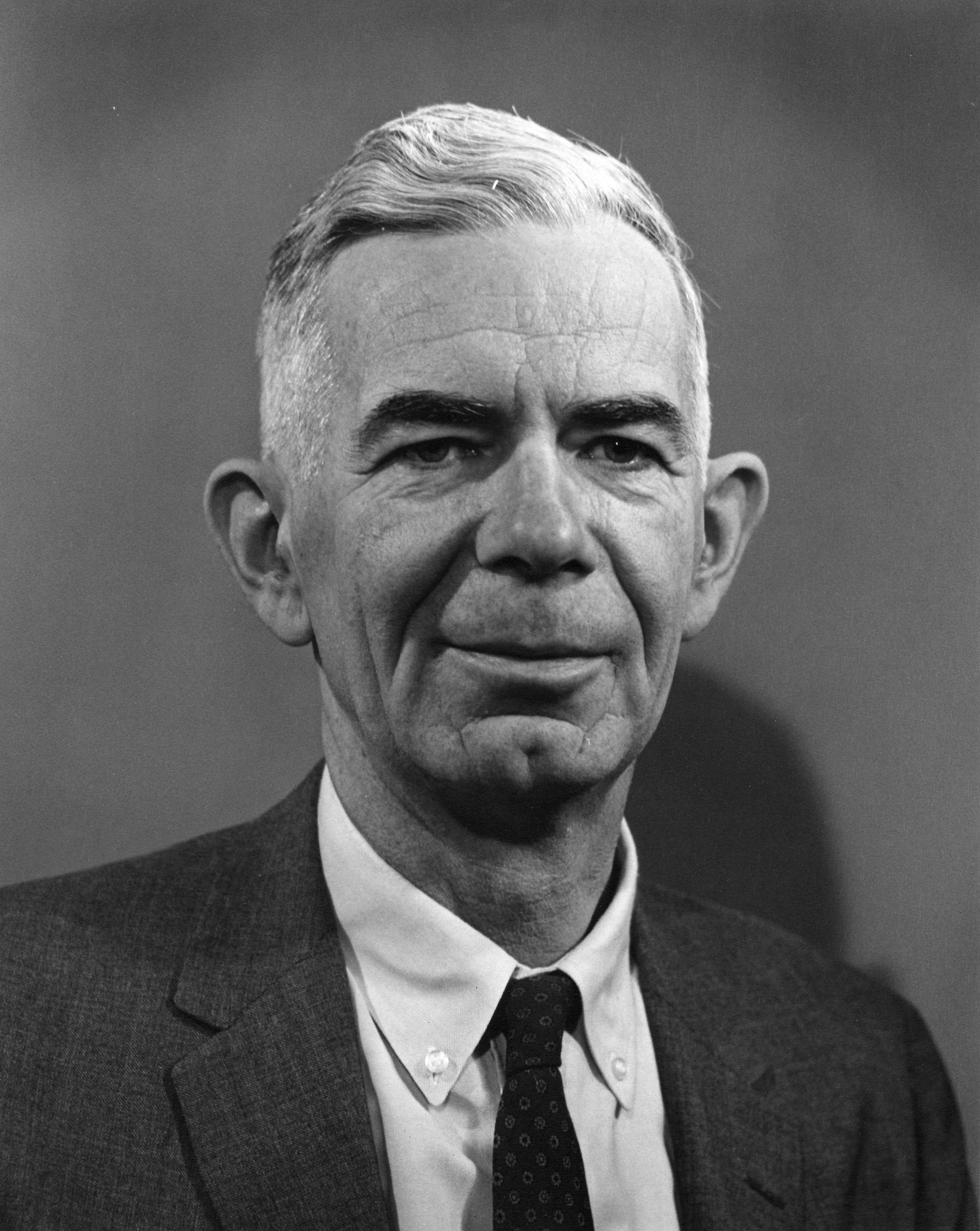
H. Richard Crane

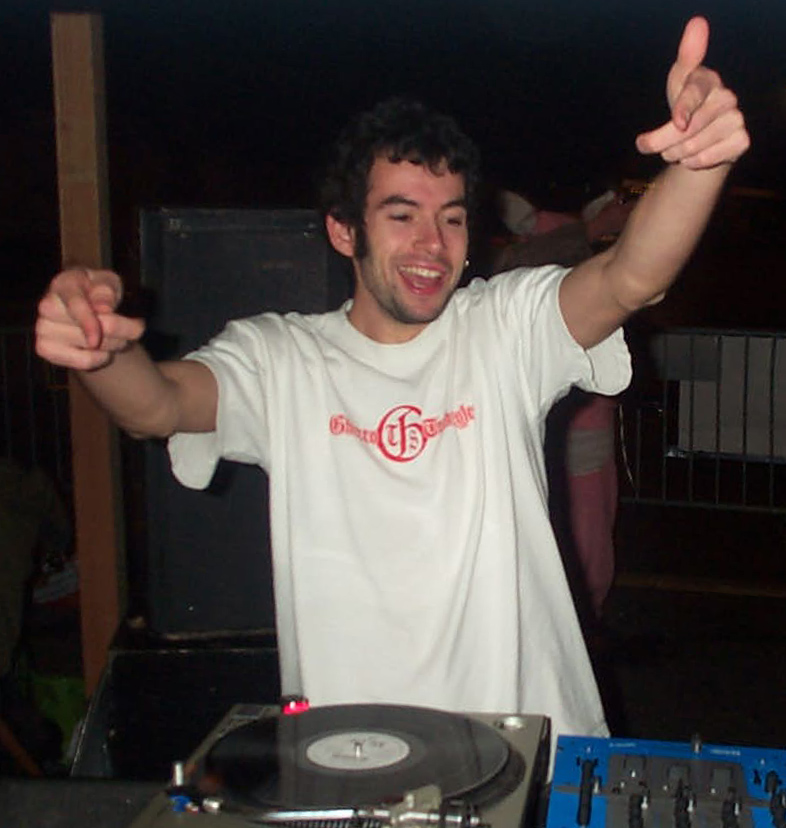
Disco D

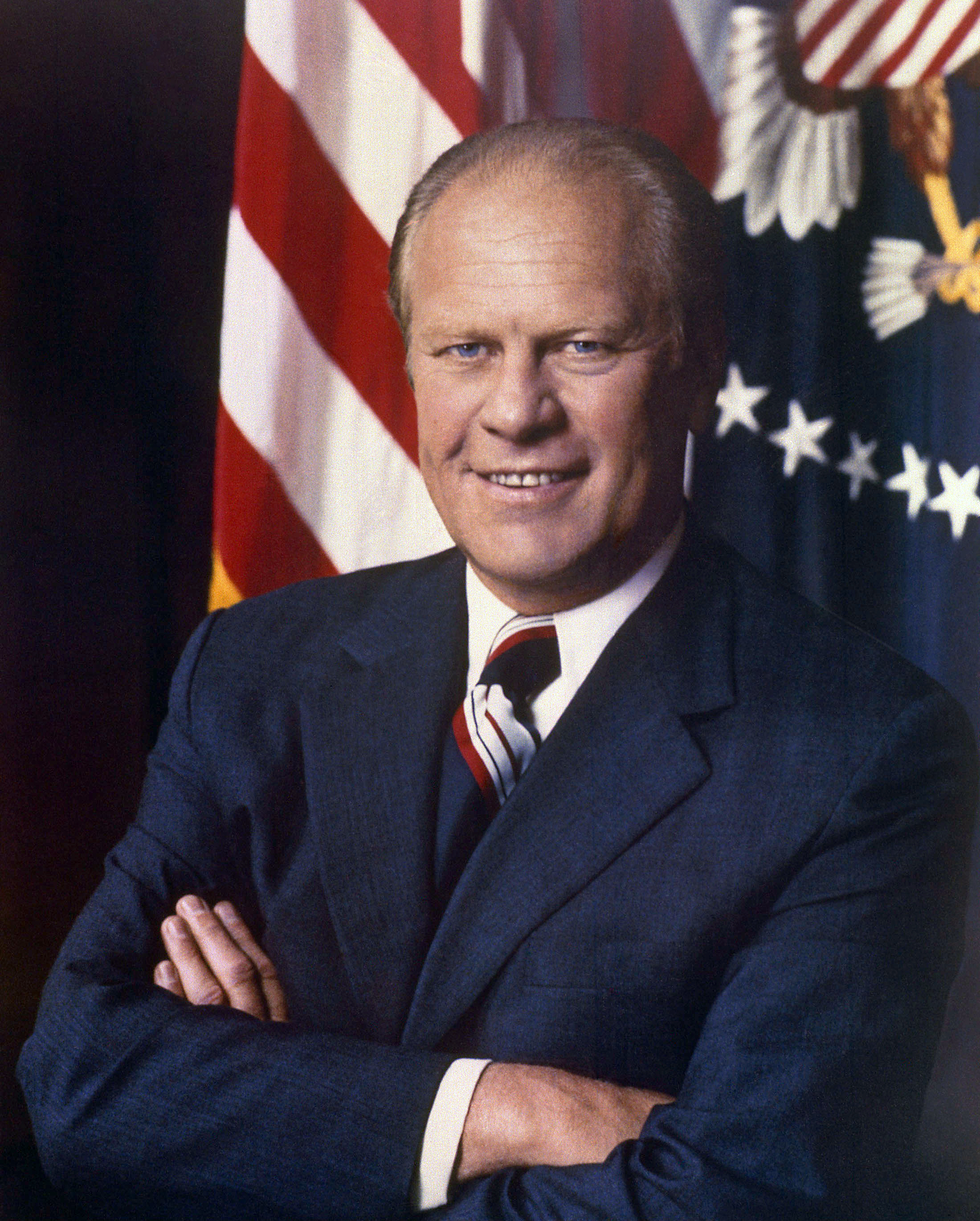
Gerald Ford

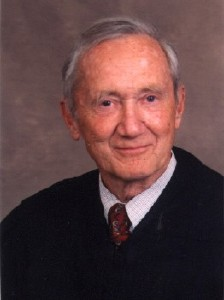
Douglas Woodruff Hillman

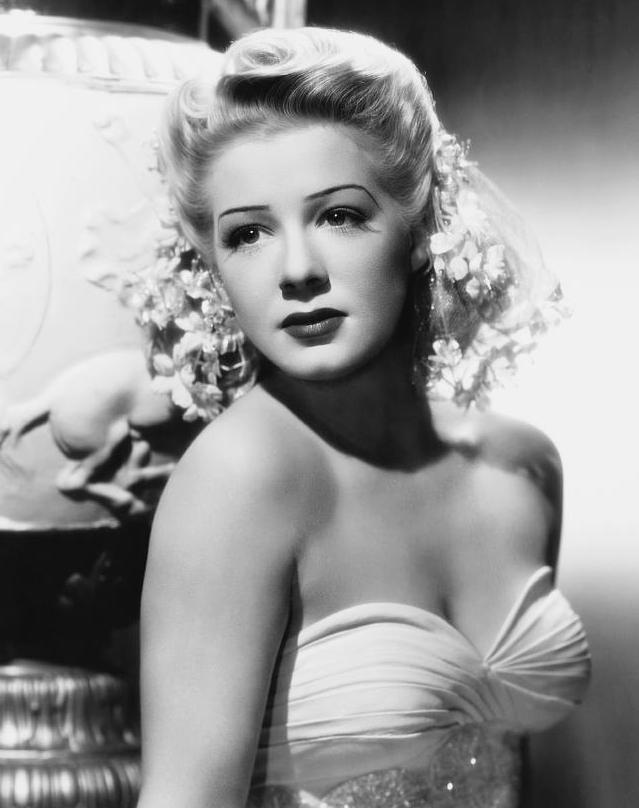
Betty Hutton

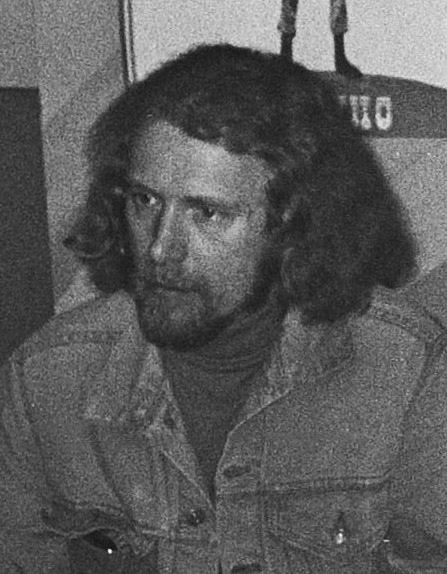
Sneaky Pete Kleinow

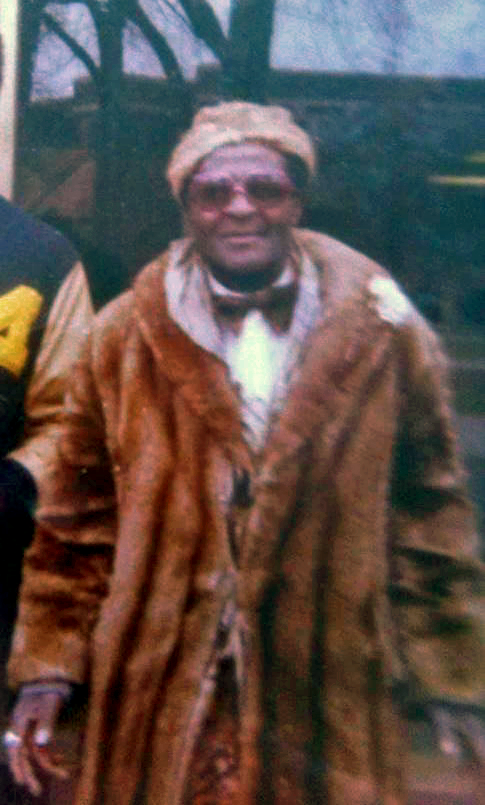
Shakey Jake

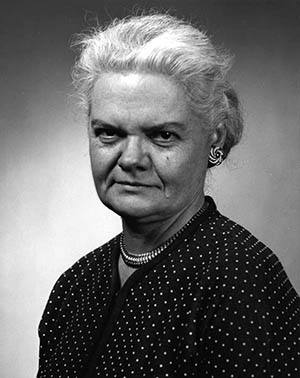
Lucille Farrier Stickel
