= 2006–07 Michigan State Spartans men's ice hockey season =

American college ice hockey season

NCAA Division I National Champion Great Lakes Invitational, Champion NCAA Tournament, Champion
- Conference: 4th CCHA
- Home ice: Munn Ice Arena

Rankings
- USCHO: 10
- USA Today: 1

Record
- Overall: 26–13–3
- Conference: 15–10–3
- Home: 13–3–1
- Road: 6–9–1
- Neutral: 7–1–1

Coaches and captains
- Head coach: Rick Comley
- Assistant coaches: Tom Newton; Brian Renfrew; Rob Woodward
- Captain: Chris Lawrence
- Alternate captain(s): Ethan Graham; Tyler Howells; Bryan Lerg; Chris Mueller

The 2006–07 Michigan State Spartans men's ice hockey season was the 65th season of play for the program and 26th in the CCHA. They represented Michigan State University in the 2006–07 NCAA Division I men's ice hockey season. They were coached by Rick Comley, in his fifth season and played their home games at Munn Ice Arena. The team won the 2007 NCAA Division I men's ice hockey tournament, the third title in program history.

== Offseason ==
=== Departures ===
| Player | Position | Nationality | Cause |
|---|---|---|---|
| David Booth | Forward | United States | Graduation (signed with Florida Panthers) |
| Colton Fretter | Forward | Canada | Graduation (signed with Gwinnett Gladiators) |
| Chad Hontvet | Forward | United States | Graduation (retired) |
| Drew Miller | Forward | United States | Signed professional contract (Anaheim Ducks) |
| Jared Nightingale | Defenseman | United States | Graduation (signed with Springfield Falcons) |
| Corey Potter | Forward | United States | Graduation (signed with New York Rangers) |
| Dominic Vicari | Goaltender | United States | Signed professional contract (Grand Rapids Griffins) |

=== Recruiting ===
| Player | Position | Nationality | Age | Notes |
|---|---|---|---|---|
| Bobby Jarosz | Goaltender | United States | 19 | Crystal Lake, IL |
| Justin Johnston | Defenseman | United States | 20 | Grosse Pointe Woods, MI |
| Mike Ratchuk | Defenseman | United States | 18 | South Buffalo, NY; selected 42nd overall in 2006 |
| Matt Schepke | Forward | United States | 21 | Warren, MI; transfer from Michigan Tech |
| Jay Sprague | Forward | Canada | 20 | Georgetown, ON |
| Ryan Turek | Defenseman | United States | 19 | Southfield, MI; selected 94th overall in 2006 |

== Season summary ==
=== Regular season ===
Entering the season, Michigan State was ranked in the top five, coming off of their best postseason performance in years. While the team had lost several players to graduation, they received great contributions from a cadre of sophomore players. While the line formed by Justin Abdelkader, Tim Crowder and Tim Kennedy proved to be a potent combination, it was in goal where Jeff Lerg proved to be just as, if not more, integral to the fortunes of the Spartans.

MSU had a mediocre start to the season, sometimes living up to their ranking an other times not. Much of this was a result of Lerg's inconsistent play, however, with only freshman Bobby Jarosz as a backup, Rick Comley decided to let his starting goalie play through the struggles. By Thanksgiving, MSU had a decent record and had performed well against other ranked teams. The College Hockey Showcase put the Spartans on the road against two strong WCHA clubs. They lost the first game against #1 Minnesota and then fell in the second game to defending national champion, Wisconsin. Though their ranking wasn't harmed too badly by the sweep, the Spartans were now sitting at .500 and could ill-afford many more like performances if they wanted to keep their NCAA hopes alive.

The team finished out the next few weeks with a winning mark, though hardly looked like world-beaters against a pair of weak conference opponents. After returning from the winter break, however, The Spartans looked like a renewed team. They kicked off the second half of their season by capturing the Great Lakes Invitational, which included downing hated rival Michigan in the championship. After splitting with a top-ranked Miami squad, The Spartans didn't lose for over a month. That stretch of good hockey helped raise the team up to #6 in the polls and put them in a prime position for the tournament. Unfortunately, the team's offense faltered at the end of the regular season and MSU dropped four of their last five games.

=== Postseason ===
MSU entered the CCHA tournament ranked #13 and could not afford a poor performance if they intended to be one of the 16 teams in the national tournament. Fortunately, the offense rediscovered their scoring touch and posted a pair of 4–2 wins over Nebraska–Omaha to reach the semifinal. While they lost the next game to Michigan, the sixth meeting of the two on the season, the Spartans retained their #10 ranking and received an at-large bid.

The selection committee gave Michigan State a #3 seed and sent them to Grand Rapids. They took on Boston University in the first game and had one of their best performances on the season, putting up 5 goals against one of the nations' best defensive teams. The second game would be an even bigger test, however, as MSU had to get through the second overall seed, Notre Dame. The Irish had the nation's best defense and had allowed less than 2 goals per game thanks to the NCAA's top goaltender, David Brown. Unsurprisingly, the game was a defensive struggle with both teams waiting for the other to make a mistake. Both squads had several opportunities on the power play but it was Michigan State who took advantage. The Spartans opened the scoring in the second on a goal from Chris Mueller. MSU remained dominant in the second even after taking a pair of minor penalties and limited the Irish to just 3 shots in the frame. Tim Kennedy added a man-advantage marker of his own in the third to give his team a 2-goal edge. Notre Dame fought back and finally beat Lerg with over 5 minutes to play but they could not find the equalizer and Michigan State held on for a narrow victory.

By the time they reached the national semifinal, Michigan State saw a far less daunting task in front of them. All four #1 seeds had already been eliminated. Despite the favorable conditions, MSU got off to a terrible start against Maine by surrendering 3 goals in the first three and a half minutes of the match. Jeff Lerg brushed off the two markers and refused to allow any more to the Black Bears. Over the final 56 minutes of the game, Michigan State outscored Maine 4–0 with goals coming from across their lineup. The victory sent Michigan State to their first title game in 20 years.

When the Spartans opened against Boston College, it appeared like they were going to be run over by the Eagles. BC carried the play throughout the first period, outshooting MSU 13–6, but neither team managed to score. The second saw a reversal with Michigan State doubling up BC in shots, however, Brian Boyle was the only one to find the back of the net. To make matters worse, MSU squandered three successive BC penalties that game them nearly 6 consecutive minutes on the power play. With the team growing increasingly desperate for a goal, Michigan State finally converted on their 5th man-advantage of the game when Kennedy skated in on a partial break-away and fired the puck past Cory Schneider. Both goaltenders played well over the following 10 minutes to keep the score knotted at 1 and the game appeared to be heading for overtime. With about 30 seconds to play, Justin Abdelkader skated in on a 3-on-1 and fired a puck off of the crossbar. Rather than deflect out of play, the puck hit the wall and remained live. Several players fought to get control along the boards and the rubber ended up on the stick of Kennedy behind the net. He wheeled around to avoid a check and then found Abdelkader skating towards the goal mouth. Abdelkader slapped the puck far-side, beating Schneider for his only goal of the tournament. With just 19 seconds left on the clock, BC had little choice but to pull their goalie before the drop of the puck. All that served to do, however, was give Chris Mueller an empty net to shoot at and make the final score 3–1.

MSU was one of the least likely champions in NCAA history. Illustrating that point is the lack of awards and honors received by the Spartans. Other than Jeff Lerg, who received the Perani Cup, not a single MSU player won an award, was an All-American or was even on an All-Conference player. Additionally, Michigan State had the fewest wins and lowest winning percentage of any champion since Minnesota in 1974.

== Roster ==
As of October 1, 2006.

| No. | Nat. | Player | Class | Pos | Height | Weight | DoB | Hometown | Previous team | NHL rights |
|---|---|---|---|---|---|---|---|---|---|---|
| 1 | | Jeff Lerg | Sophomore | G | 5' 6" (1.68 m) | 155 lb (70 kg) | 1986-04-09 | Livonia, Michigan | Omaha Lancers (USHL) | — |
| 3 | | Chris Snavely | Senior | D | 5' 9" (1.75 m) | 170 lb (77 kg) | 1982-12-04 | Lancaster, Pennsylvania | Cedar Rapids Roughriders (USHL) | — |
| 4 | | Ethan Graham (A) | Senior | D | 6' 2" (1.88 m) | 185 lb (84 kg) | 1982-08-01 | Xenia, Ohio | Lincoln Stars (USHL) | — |
| 5 | | Justin Johnston | Freshman | D | 6' 0" (1.83 m) | 180 lb (82 kg) | 1986-03-26 | Grosse Pointe Woods, Michigan | Texarkana Bandits (NAHL) | — |
| 6 | | Brandon Gentile | Sophomore | D | 6' 0" (1.83 m) | 196 lb (89 kg) | 1987-04-23 | Clarkston, Michigan | USNTDP (NAHL) | — |
| 7 | | Matt Shouneyia | Sophomore | D | 5' 9" (1.75 m) | 184 lb (83 kg) | 1985-11-03 | Cleveland, Ohio | Cleveland Barons (NAHL) | — |
| 8 | | Brandon Warner | Senior | D | 6' 0" (1.83 m) | 170 lb (77 kg) | 1983-01-04 | Huntertown, Indiana | Pittsburgh Forge (NAHL) | — |
| 9 | | Justin Abdelkader | Sophomore | F | 6' 2" (1.88 m) | 213 lb (97 kg) | 1987-02-25 | Muskegon, Michigan | Cedar Rapids RoughRiders (USHL) | DET, 42nd overall 2005 |
| 10 | | Tim Kennedy | Sophomore | F | 5' 10" (1.78 m) | 176 lb (80 kg) | 1986-04-30 | Buffalo, New York | Sioux City Musketeers (USHL) | WSH, 181st overall 2005 |
| 11 | | Bryan Lerg (A) | Junior | F | 5' 10" (1.78 m) | 175 lb (79 kg) | 1986-01-20 | Livonia, Michigan | USNTDP (NAHL) | — |
| 13 | | Ryan Turek | Freshman | D | 6' 0" (1.83 m) | 185 lb (84 kg) | 1987-09-22 | Southfield, Michigan | Omaha Lancers (USHL) | STL, 94th overall 2006 |
| 14 | | Zak McClellan | Sophomore | F | 6' 1" (1.85 m) | 200 lb (91 kg) | 1983-03-05 | Frankenmuth, Michigan | Bozeman IceDogs (NAHL) | — |
| 15 | | Jeff Dunne | Junior | D | 5' 11" (1.8 m) | 195 lb (88 kg) | 1985-06-23 | Grover, Missouri | Chicago Steel (USHL) | — |
| 16 | | Tyler Howells (A) | Senior | D | 5' 8" (1.73 m) | 170 lb (77 kg) | 1983-10-20 | Eden Prairie, Minnesota | Cedar Rapids RoughRiders (USHL) | — |
| 17 | | Jay Sprague | Freshman | F | 6' 2" (1.88 m) | 205 lb (93 kg) | 1986-08-23 | Georgetown, Ontario | Indiana Ice (USHL) | — |
| 19 | | Chris Mueller (A) | Junior | F | 5' 11" (1.8 m) | 196 lb (89 kg) | 1986-03-06 | West Seneca, New York | Nichols School (USHS–NY) | — |
| 20 | | Chris Lawrence (C) | Senior | F | 5' 11" (1.8 m) | 170 lb (77 kg) | 1982-03-08 | Havertown, Pennsylvania | Pittsburgh Forge (NAHL) | — |
| 22 | | Nick Sucharski | Sophomore | F | 6' 1" (1.85 m) | 180 lb (82 kg) | 1987-11-15 | Toronto, Ontario | Wexford Raiders (OPJHL) | CBJ, 136th overall 2006 |
| 24 | | Matt Schepke | Sophomore | F | 5' 11" (1.8 m) | 196 lb (89 kg) | 1985-01-03 | Warren, Michigan | Omaha Lancers (USHL) | — |
| 25 | | Jim McKenzie | Junior | F | 6' 2" (1.88 m) | 210 lb (95 kg) | 1984-06-10 | Saint Paul, Minnesota | Sioux Falls Stampede (USHL) | OTT, 141st overall 2004 |
| 26 | | Kurt Kivisto | Sophomore | F | 5' 8" (1.73 m) | 175 lb (79 kg) | 1985-03-08 | Brighton, Michigan | Cleveland Barons (NAHL) | — |
| 27 | | Dan Sturges | Sophomore | F | 6' 0" (1.83 m) | 190 lb (86 kg) | 1985-05-30 | Madison, Wisconsin | Green Bay Gamblers (USHL) | — |
| 28 | | Daniel Vukovic | Junior | D | 6' 3" (1.91 m) | 229 lb (104 kg) | 1986-02-19 | North York, Ontario | St. Michael's Buzzers (OPJHL) | — |
| 30 | | Steve Mnich | Sophomore | G | 5' 9" (1.75 m) | 154 lb (70 kg) | 1986-09-10 | Northville, Michigan | Dallas Stars Elite (T1EHL) | — |
| 35 | | Bobby Jarosz | Freshman | G | 6' 0" (1.83 m) | 172 lb (78 kg) | 1987-03-30 | Crystal Lake, Illinois | Cleveland Barons (NAHL) | — |
| 40 | | Tim Crowder | Sophomore | F | 6' 2" (1.88 m) | 195 lb (88 kg) | 1986-10-16 | Victoria, British Columbia | Surrey Eagles (BCHL) | PIT, 126th overall 2005 |
| 44 | | Mike Ratchuk | Freshman | D | 5' 11" (1.8 m) | 190 lb (86 kg) | 1988-02-20 | South Buffalo, New York | USNTDP (NAHL) | PHI, 42nd overall 2006 |

== Standings ==
2006–07 Central Collegiate Hockey Association standings
| | Conference | | | | | | | Overall | | | | | |
| | GP | W | L | T | PTS | GF | GA | GP | W | L | T | GF | GA |
|---|---|---|---|---|---|---|---|---|---|---|---|---|---|
| #4 Notre Dame†* | 28 | 21 | 4 | 3 | 45 | 90 | 51 | 42 | 32 | 7 | 3 | 143 | 70 |
| #10 Michigan | 28 | 18 | 9 | 1 | 37 | 119 | 85 | 41 | 26 | 14 | 1 | 174 | 129 |
| #11 Miami | 28 | 16 | 8 | 4 | 36 | 93 | 70 | 42 | 24 | 14 | 4 | 135 | 107 |
| #1 Michigan State | 28 | 15 | 10 | 3 | 33 | 81 | 65 | 42 | 26 | 13 | 3 | 137 | 102 |
| Nebraska–Omaha | 28 | 13 | 11 | 4 | 30 | 100 | 85 | 42 | 18 | 16 | 8 | 153 | 128 |
| Western Michigan | 28 | 14 | 13 | 1 | 29 | 85 | 93 | 37 | 18 | 18 | 1 | 120 | 126 |
| Ohio State | 28 | 12 | 12 | 4 | 28 | 89 | 86 | 37 | 15 | 17 | 5 | 120 | 120 |
| Lake Superior State | 28 | 11 | 14 | 3 | 25 | 65 | 74 | 43 | 21 | 19 | 3 | 111 | 110 |
| Ferris State | 28 | 10 | 16 | 2 | 22 | 70 | 92 | 39 | 14 | 22 | 3 | 107 | 126 |
| Northern Michigan | 28 | 10 | 17 | 1 | 21 | 66 | 80 | 41 | 15 | 24 | 2 | 96 | 123 |
| Alaska | 28 | 7 | 16 | 5 | 19 | 70 | 90 | 39 | 11 | 22 | 6 | 100 | 128 |
| Bowling Green | 28 | 5 | 22 | 1 | 11 | 51 | 108 | 38 | 7 | 29 | 2 | 75 | 147 |
Championship: Notre Dame † indicates conference regular season champion * indicates conference tournament champion Final rankings: USA Today/USA Hockey Magazine Top 15 Poll

== Schedule and results ==
| Date | Time | Opponent^{#} | Rank^{#} | Site | TV | Decision | Result | Attendance | Record |
Exhibition
| October 6 | 7:05 PM | vs. Wilfrid Laurier* | #5 | Munn Ice Arena • East Lansing, Michigan (Exhibition) | | Lerg | W 11–2 | 3,659 | |
Regular Season
| October 13 | 7:05 PM | vs. Western Michigan | #4 | Munn Ice Arena • East Lansing, Michigan | | Lerg | W 4–1 | 4,947 | 1–0–0 (1–0–0) |
| October 15 | 3:05 PM | at Western Michigan | #4 | Lawson Arena • Kalamazoo, Michigan | | Lerg | L 2–3 | 2,824 | 1–1–0 (1–1–0) |
| October 19 | 7:05 PM | at USNTDP | #8 | Munn Ice Arena • East Lansing, Michigan | | Lerg | L 4–5 | 3,968 | |
| October 27 | 7:05 PM | vs. St. Lawrence* | #10 | Munn Ice Arena • East Lansing, Michigan | | Lerg | W 5–3 | 4,656 | 2–1–0 |
| October 29 | 7:07 PM | vs. Sacred Heart* | #10 | Munn Ice Arena • East Lansing, Michigan | | Lerg | W 7–5 | 4,600 | 3–1–0 |
| November 3 | 7:05 PM | vs. #9 Michigan | #5 | Munn Ice Arena • East Lansing, Michigan (Rivalry) | | Lerg | W 7–4 | 7,092 | 4–1–0 (2–1–0) |
| November 4 | 7:30 PM | at #9 Michigan | #5 | Yost Ice Arena • Ann Arbor, Michigan (Rivalry) | | Lerg | L 2–6 | 6,887 | 4–2–0 (2–2–0) |
| November 7 | 7:05 PM | vs. Ferris State | #5 | Munn Ice Arena • East Lansing, Michigan | | Lerg | T 2–2 ^{OT} | 6,763 | 4–2–1 (2–2–1) |
| November 10 | 7:05 PM | at Ferris State | #5 | Ewigleben Arena • Big Rapids, Michigan | | Lerg | W 6–0 | 2,172 | 5–2–1 (3–2–1) |
| November 17 | 8:07 PM | at #6 Notre Dame | #4 | Compton Family Ice Arena • Notre Dame, Indiana | | Lerg | L 1–4 | 2,763 | 5–3–1 (3–3–1) |
| November 18 | 7:05 PM | at #6 Notre Dame | #4 | Munn Ice Arena • East Lansing, Michigan | | Lerg | W 2–0 | 5,665 | 6–3–1 (4–3–1) |
| November 21 | 7:35 PM | at #7 Michigan | #6 | Yost Ice Arena • Ann Arbor, Michigan (Rivalry) | | Lerg | L 1–2 | 6,612 | 6–4–1 (4–4–1) |
College Hockey Showcase
| November 25 | 8:07 PM | at #1 Minnesota* | #6 | 3M Arena at Mariucci • Minneapolis, Minnesota (College Hockey Showcase Game 1) | | Lerg | L 4–5 | 10,145 | 6–5–1 |
| November 26 | 8:07 PM | at Wisconsin* | #6 | Kohl Center • Madison, Wisconsin (College Hockey Showcase Game 2) | | Lerg | L 0–2 | 14,120 | 6–6–1 |
| December 1 | 7:05 PM | vs. Ohio State | #12 | Munn Ice Arena • East Lansing, Michigan | | Lerg | W 4–1 | 5,510 | 7–6–1 (5–4–1) |
| December 2 | 7:05 PM | vs. Ohio State | #12 | Munn Ice Arena • East Lansing, Michigan | | Lerg | L 1–4 | 5,522 | 7–7–1 (5–5–1) |
| December 8 | 7:35 PM | at Northern Michigan | #14 | Berry Events Center • Marquette, Michigan | | Lerg | W 3–2 | 3,116 | 8–7–1 (6–5–1) |
| December 9 | 7:35 PM | at Northern Michigan | #14 | Berry Events Center • Marquette, Michigan | | Lerg | W 3–2 | 3,408 | 9–7–1 (7–5–1) |
Great Lakes Invitational
| December 29 | 4:36 PM | vs. Harvard* | #14 | Joe Louis Arena • Detroit, Michigan (Great Lakes Invitational Semifinal) | | Lerg | W 5–2 | 14,684 | 10–7–1 |
| December 31 | 7:36 PM | vs. #11 Michigan* | #14 | Joe Louis Arena • Detroit, Michigan (Great Lakes Invitational Championship; Rivalry) | | Lerg | W 4–1 | 15,934 | 11–7–1 |
| January 5 | 7:35 PM | at #6 Miami | #10 | Steve Cady Arena • Oxford, Ohio | | Lerg | L 2–5 | 3,642 | 11–8–1 (7–6–1) |
| January 6 | 7:05 PM | at #6 Miami | #10 | Steve Cady Arena • Oxford, Ohio | | Lerg | W 4–1 | 3,642 | 12–8–1 (8–6–1) |
| January 12 | 7:05 PM | vs. Alaska | #10 | Munn Ice Arena • East Lansing, Michigan | | Lerg | W 3–2 ^{OT} | 6,338 | 13–8–1 (9–6–1) |
| January 13 | 7:05 PM | vs. Alaska | #10 | Munn Ice Arena • East Lansing, Michigan | | Lerg | W 4–3 | 6,910 | 14–8–1 (10–6–1) |
| January 19 | 7:05 PM | vs. Lake Superior State | #11 | Munn Ice Arena • East Lansing, Michigan | | Lerg | W 3–2 ^{OT} | 5,900 | 15–8–1 (11–6–1) |
| January 20 | 6:05 PM | vs. Lake Superior State | #11 | Munn Ice Arena • East Lansing, Michigan | | Lerg | W 4–0 | 6,653 | 16–8–1 (12–6–1) |
| February 2 | 8:05 PM | at Nebraska–Omaha | #6 | Baxter Arena • Omaha, Nebraska | | Lerg | W 5–1 | 7,317 | 17–8–1 (13–6–1) |
| February 3 | 8:05 PM | at Nebraska–Omaha | #6 | Baxter Arena • Omaha, Nebraska | | Lerg | T 3–3 ^{OT} | 8,578 | 17–8–2 (13–6–2) |
| February 9 | 7:35 PM | vs. Ferris State | #6 | Munn Ice Arena • East Lansing, Michigan | | Lerg | W 2–1 ^{OT} | 6,385 | 18–8–2 (14–6–2) |
| February 10 | 7:35 PM | vs. #9 Michigan | #6 | Joe Louis Arena • Detroit, Michigan (Rivalry) | | Lerg | T 3–3 ^{OT} | 16,489 | 18–8–3 (14–6–3) |
| February 13 | 7:35 PM | at Ferris State | #6 | Ewigleben Arena • Big Rapids, Michigan | | Lerg | L 1–2 | 2,039 | 18–9–3 (14–7–3) |
| February 16 | 7:35 PM | at Western Michigan | #6 | Lawson Arena • Kalamazoo, Michigan | | Lerg | L 3–4 | 3,755 | 18–10–3 (14–8–3) |
| February 17 | 7:05 PM | vs. Western Michigan | #6 | Munn Ice Arena • East Lansing, Michigan | | Lerg | L 0–4 | 3,755 | 18–11–3 (14–9–3) |
| February 23 | 7:05 PM | at Bowling Green | #13 | BGSU Ice Arena • Bowling Green, Ohio | | Lerg | W 5–3 | 3,337 | 19–11–3 (15–9–3) |
| February 25 | 7:07 PM | vs. Bowling Green | #13 | Munn Ice Arena • East Lansing, Michigan | | Lerg | L 1–2 | 6,462 | 19–12–3 (15–10–3) |
CCHA Tournament
| March 9 | 7:05 PM | vs. Nebraska–Omaha* | #13 | Munn Ice Arena • East Lansing, Michigan (CCHA Quarterfinals Game 1) | | Lerg | W 4–2 | 3,719 | 20–12–3 |
| March 10 | 7:05 PM | vs. Nebraska–Omaha* | #13 | Munn Ice Arena • East Lansing, Michigan (CCHA Quarterfinals Game 2) | | Lerg | W 4–2 | 3,819 | 21–12–3 |
| March 16 | 8:08 PM | vs. #9 Michigan* | #10 | Joe Louis Arena • Detroit, Michigan (CCHA Semifinal; Rivalry) | | Lerg | L 2–5 | 13,238 | 21–13–3 |
| March 17 | 3:35 PM | vs. Lake Superior State* | #10 | Joe Louis Arena • Detroit, Michigan (CCHA Third Place Game) | | Lerg | W 7–6 ^{OT} | - | 22–13–3 |
NCAA Tournament
| March 23 | 10:05 PM | vs. #9 Boston University* | #10 | Van Andel Arena • Grand Rapids, Michigan (Midwest Regional Semifinal) | | Lerg | W 5–1 | 5,201 | 23–13–3 |
| March 24 | 8:35 PM | vs. #1 Notre Dame* | #10 | Van Andel Arena • Grand Rapids, Michigan (Midwest Regional Final) | | Lerg | W 2–1 | 4,839 | 24–13–3 |
| April 5 | 4:08 PM | vs. #14 Maine* | #10 | Scottrade Center • St. Louis, Missouri (National Semifinal) | | Lerg | W 4–2 | 18,857 | 25–13–3 |
| April 7 | 7:04 PM | vs. #4 Boston College* | #10 | Scottrade Center • St. Louis, Missouri (National Championship) | ESPN | Lerg | W 3–1 | 19,432 | 26–13–3 |
*Non-conference game. ^{#}Rankings from USCHO.com Poll. All times are in Eastern Time. Source:

== National championship game ==
=== (NE2) Boston College vs. (MW3) Michigan State ===
| April 7, 2007 | (NE2) Boston College | 1–3 (0–0, 1–0, 0–3) | (MW3) Michigan State | Scottrade Center, St. Louis, Missouri; Attendance: 19,432 |

Game reference
| Referee: Derek Shepherd; Linesmen: Bob Keltie; Butch Mousseaux |

Scoring summary
| Period | Team | Goal | Assist(s) | Time | Score |
|---|---|---|---|---|---|
| 1st | None | | | | |
| 2nd | BC | Brian Boyle (19) – PP | Bradford | 26:50 | 1–0 BC |
| 3rd | MSU | Tim Kennedy (18) – PP | Abdelkader | 49:53 | 1–1 |
| 3rd | MSU | Justin Abdelkader (15) – GW | Kennedy and Howells | 59:41 | 2–1 MSU |
| 3rd | MSU | Chris Mueller (16) – EN | McKenzie and Vukovic | 59:58 | 3–1 MSU |
Penalty summary
| Period | Team | Player | Penalty | Time | PIM |
| 1st | MSU | Chris Snavely | Obstruction Interference | 09:46 | 2:00 |
| 1st | BC | Dan Bertram | Holding the Stick | 17:34 | 2:00 |
| 1st | MSU | Ethan Graham | Unsportsmanlike Conduct | 17:51 | 2:00 |
| 1st | BC | Nathan Gerbe | Unsportsmanlike Conduct | 17:51 | 2:00 |
| 2nd | MSU | Justin Abdelkader | Hooking | 23:34 | 2:00 |
| 2nd | MSU | Tim Crowder | Hooking | 25:00 | 2:00 |
| 2nd | BC | Tim Filangieri | Interference | 28:38 | 2:00 |
| 2nd | BC | Brian Boyle | Tripping | 30:31 | 2:00 |
| 2nd | BC | Carl Sneep | Slashing | 32:58 | 2:00 |
| 3rd | MSU | Justin Abdelkader | Interference | 41:35 | 2:00 |
| 3rd | BC | Matt Greene | Charging the Goaltender | 43:39 | 2:00 |
| 3rd | MSU | Ethan Graham | Roughing | 47:51 | 2:00 |
| 3rd | BC | Kyle Kucharski | Slashing | 47:51 | 2:00 |
| 3rd | BC | Tim Filangieri | Hooking | 49:47 | 2:00 |

Shots by period
| Team | 1 | 2 | 3 | T |
|---|---|---|---|---|
| Michigan State | 6 | 12 | 11 | 29 |
| Boston College | 13 | 6 | 11 | 30 |

Goaltenders
| Team | Name | Saves | Goals against | Time on ice |
|---|---|---|---|---|
| MSU | Jeff Lerg | 29 | 1 | 60:00 |
| BC | Cory Schneider | 26 | 2 | 59:41 |

== Scoring statistics ==
| Name | Position | Games | Goals | Assists | Points | PIM |
|---|---|---|---|---|---|---|
| Tim Kennedy | C/LW | 42 | 18 | 25 | 43 | 49 |
| Bryan Lerg | C/LW | 41 | 23 | 13 | 36 | 21 |
| Justin Abdelkader | LW/RW | 38 | 15 | 18 | 33 | 91 |
| Chris Mueller | C/RW | 42 | 16 | 16 | 32 | 30 |
| Jim McKenzie | RW | 35 | 12 | 18 | 30 | 56 |
| Tyler Howells | D/F | 42 | 4 | 22 | 26 | 22 |
| Tim Crowder | C/RW | 41 | 14 | 11 | 25 | 18 |
| Nick Sucharski | LW | 41 | 9 | 15 | 24 | 32 |
| Ethan Graham | D | 35 | 1 | 12 | 13 | 30 |
| Daniel Vukovic | D | 42 | 7 | 5 | 12 | 18 |
| Mike Ratchuk | D | 40 | 4 | 8 | 12 | 28 |
| Jay Sprague | F | 32 | 3 | 9 | 12 | 14 |
| Chris Snavely | D | 27 | 2 | 9 | 11 | 26 |
| Jeff Dunne | D | 33 | 1 | 10 | 11 | 21 |
| Chris Lawrence | F | 40 | 1 | 6 | 7 | 19 |
| Brandon Warner | D | 23 | 2 | 4 | 6 | 14 |
| Dan Sturges | F | 21 | 1 | 5 | 6 | 4 |
| Matt Schepke | LW | 23 | 3 | 2 | 5 | 14 |
| Brandon Gentile | D | 41 | 0 | 4 | 4 | 55 |
| Kurt Kivisto | F | 14 | 1 | 1 | 2 | 2 |
| Zak McClellan | RW | 27 | 0 | 2 | 2 | 8 |
| Ryan Turek | D | 31 | 0 | 2 | 2 | 18 |
| Jeff Lerg | G | 42 | 0 | 2 | 2 | 0 |
| Matt Shouneyia | F | 2 | 0 | 0 | 0 | 0 |
| Justin Johnston | D | 3 | 0 | 0 | 0 | 0 |
| Bobby Jarosz | G | 3 | 0 | 0 | 0 | 0 |
| Bench | - | - | - | - | - | 8 |
| Total | | | 137 | 219 | 356 | 598 |

== Goaltending statistics ==
| Name | Games | Minutes | Wins | Losses | Ties | Goals against | Saves | Shut outs | SV % | GAA |
|---|---|---|---|---|---|---|---|---|---|---|
| Bobby Jarosz | 3 | 68:43 | 0 | 0 | 0 | 1 | 36 | 0 | .973 | 0.87 |
| Jeff Lerg | 42 | 2465:06 | 26 | 13 | 3 | 99 | 1042 | 3 | .913 | 2.41 |
| Empty Net | - | 11:10 | - | - | - | 2 | - | - | - | - |
| Total | 42 | 2544:59 | 26 | 13 | 3 | 102 | 1078 | 3 | .914 | 2.40 |

== Rankings ==
| Poll | Week | | | | | | | | | | | | | | | | | | | | | | | | | |
| Poll | Pre | 1 | 2 | 3 | 4 | 5 | 6 | 7 | 8 | 9 | 10 | 11 | 12 | 13 | 14 | 15 | 16 | 17 | 18 | 19 | 20 | 21 | 22 | 23 | 24 | 25 (Final) |
|---|---|---|---|---|---|---|---|---|---|---|---|---|---|---|---|---|---|---|---|---|---|---|---|---|---|---|
| USCHO.com | 5 (1) | 4 | 8 | 9 | 6 | 6 | 4 | 6 | 12 | 15 | 14 | 14 | 10 | 10 | 11 | 9 | 6 | 6 | 6 | 13 | 14 | 13 | 10 | 10 | - | - |
| USA Today | 4 | 3 | 8 | 10 | 5 | 5 | 4 | 6 | 12 | 14 | 14 | 14 | - | 10 | 11 | 8 | 7 | 6 | 5 | 13 | 14 | 13 | 11 | 10 | 5 | 1 (33) |

Note: USCHO did not release a poll in weeks 24 or 25, USA Today did not release a poll in week 12.

== Awards and honors ==
| Player | Award | Ref |
|---|---|---|
| Justin Abdelkader | NCAA Tournament Most Outstanding Player | |
| Jeff Lerg | Perani Cup | |
| Jeff Lerg | NCAA All-Tournament Team | |
| Tyler Howells | NCAA All-Tournament Team | |
| Justin Abdelkader | NCAA All-Tournament Team | |
| Tim Kennedy | NCAA All-Tournament Team | |

== Players drafted into the NHL ==
=== 2007 NHL entry draft ===
| = NHL All-Star team | = NHL All-Star | = NHL All-Star and NHL All-Star team | = Did not play in the NHL |

| Round | Pick | Player | NHL team |
|---|---|---|---|
| 3 | 89 | Corey Tropp^{†} | Buffalo Sabres |
| 5 | 142 | Andrew Conboy^{†} | Montreal Canadiens |
| 7 | 190 | Trevor Nill^{†} | St. Louis Blues |

† incoming freshman
