= Heather MacAllister (activist) =

American performer and activist

- Born: February 25, 1968; Michigan, U.S.
- Died: February 13, 2007 (aged 38); Portland, Oregon, U.S.
- Other names: Reva Lucian; Ms. Demeanor
- Occupations: Political activist, performer
- Partner: Kelli Dunham

Heather MacAllister (February 25, 1968 – February 13, 2007) was an American burlesque performer and social justice activist, whose work covered anti-racism, LGBT rights, and especially the fat acceptance movement. MacAllister performed on stage as Reva Lucian, a play on 'revolution', and Ms. Demeanor.

== Early life and education ==
Heather MacAllister was born in Michigan on the February 25, 1968, and grew up in Dearborn and Ann Arbor, Michigan. She completed a bachelor's degree in anthropology and African American studies from Eastern Michigan University in 1998. She also lived in Tucson, Arizona, and moved from Detroit to San Francisco in 2002.

== Career and activism ==
MacAllister was involved in a range of social justice issues, particularly LGBT rights, anti-racism and addressing anti-fat bias. Her tours as a fat burlesque performer challenged the notion of The Thin Ideal as a pre-requisite for sexual attractiveness.

=== Fat activism ===
Whilst she was living in Michigan, Heather MacAllister's fat activism included the founding in 1992 of the Venus Group, a social and support network for large women. She also contributed to Fat Girl zine in the early 1990s, and lobbied for the weight discrimination act that was passed in San Francisco in 2000. MacAllister was on the board of NoLose, an organization for fat lesbians.

MacAllister founded Big Burlesque and the Fat-Bottom Revue, the world's first all-fat burlesque performance group, of which she was also the artistic director. She argued that erotic performance allowed fat women to express a sexuality "which has been underaffirmed and made negative in the popular culture". Her stage names were Ms. Demeanor and Reva Lucian (a play on the word "revolution"). MacAllister toured size acceptance workshops and burlesque performances nationwide. Venues at which she appeared or conducted workshops included the True Spirit Conference in Washington, D.C., the National Women's Music Festival in Indiana, the Michigan Womyn's Music Festival, Eastern Michigan University, University of Michigan, Michigan State University, the Abundia Retreat in Illinois, the NoLose Conference in New Jersey, Fat Girl Speaks in Oregon, the Tease-o-Rama burlesque convention, and Burning Man in Nevada. MacAllister described her belief in burlesque as activism: "Any time there is a fat person onstage as anything besides the butt of a joke, it's political. Add physical movement, then dance, then sexuality and you have a revolutionary act".

In 2006 Heather MacAllister received the Queer Cultural Activist Award from the Harvey Milk LGBT Democratic Club.

=== Other activism ===
In the late 1990s Heather MacAllister was the director of the LGBT resource center at Eastern Michigan University.

From 2000 to 2002, MacAllister worked as a field organizer for the Triangle Foundation, a gay rights group in Michigan. The organization, now known as Equality Michigan, gives an award in her honor to a community activist each year.

MacAllister campaigned for Muslim- and Arab-American civil rights after 9-11 and served on the board of Al-Fatiha, the national organization for sexual minority Muslims in the United States. She also served on the board of Transgender Michigan, a group dedicated to protecting transgender people from harassment and discrimination.

== Illness and death ==
Suffering from ovarian cancer, Heather MacAllister moved from San Francisco to Portland, Oregon in June 2006. Her partner, author and stand-up comedian Kelli Dunham, moved from the East Coast to care for her until her death by assisted suicide on February 13, 2007, aged 38. Memorial services were held in Portland, Detroit, New York and San Francisco.

MacAllister appeared posthumously in the art photography book The Full Body Project by photographer and actor Leonard Nimoy. The book is a compilation of photographs including those taken of MacAllister and her troupe for a 2005 New York City art photography show called "Maximum Beauty" which opened at the Bonni Benrubi gallery on 57th street in New York City. The book was released in 2007 and dedicated to MacAllister. Before her death she had requested that mourners made donations to her Fat Fashion Scholarship Fund. MacAllister also contributed a chapter to The Fat Studies Reader entitled 'Embodying Fat Liberation' that was posthumously published in 2009.

== See also ==
- Fat acceptance movement
- Guerilla burlesque
- Neo-burlesque
