= Shakey Jake =

American street musician (1925–2007)

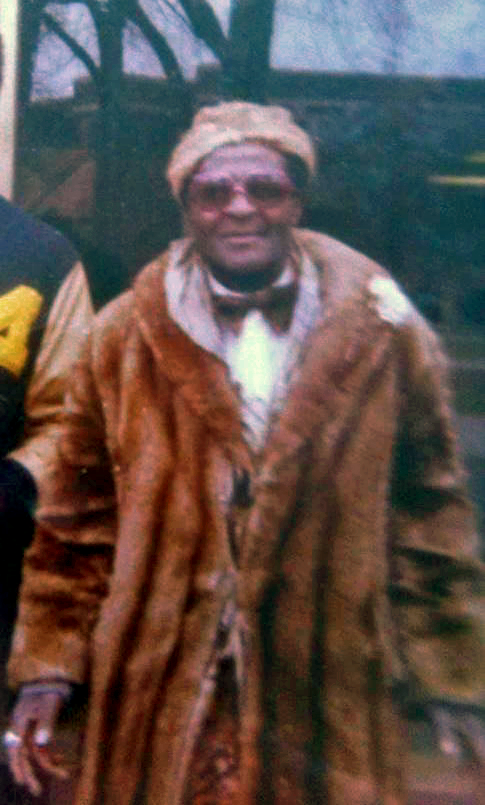
Shakey Jake circa 1980

Shakey Jake (sometimes “Shakin’ Jake”; August 24, 1925 – September 16, 2007), born Jake Woods in Little Rock, Arkansas, United States, was a street musician and storyteller well known to students and residents of Ann Arbor, Michigan, from the time of his arrival there in 1973 until his death. Woods, who had moved as a child with his family from Little Rock to Saginaw, Michigan, travelled from Saginaw to Ann Arbor for a brief appearance at the Ann Arbor Blues Festival in 1973, and decided to stay.

Jake could be seen regularly on the streets of Ann Arbor in his unconventional clothing, strumming his guitar and singing (generally tuneless) songs to passers-by. He also sold cassettes and CDs of his music, and T-shirts and bumper stickers bearing the slogan, “I brake for Jake”.

In conversation, Jake enjoyed recounting a variety of implausible stories about his life and upbringing – claiming, for example, that he had been born on Halloween in 1900 and was 104 years old, that he had been a smoker since the age of one, or that he had dozens of invisible bodyguards.

Despite his disheveled appearance and quirky conversational style, Jake was unthreatening, and was well-liked by those who knew – or even merely knew of – him. Indeed, he was a welcome patron at many Ann Arbor retail establishments. By many accounts, Jake was one of the most popular parts of the city's annual Fourth of July parade. Although many believed him to be homeless, he lived in rented rooms or in public housing.

Shakey Jake was the inspiration for Calhoun Tubbs, a sketch character created and portrayed by David Alan Grier in the television comedy series In Living Color.

Jake died in 2007 of kidney failure, at the age of 82. A memorial service drew 400 mourners. Afterwards a smaller group paraded for an hour through the streets of Ann Arbor past some of Jake's favorite spots, singing songs and playing instruments.
