= Daniel Vukovic =

Canadian-Swiss ice hockey player

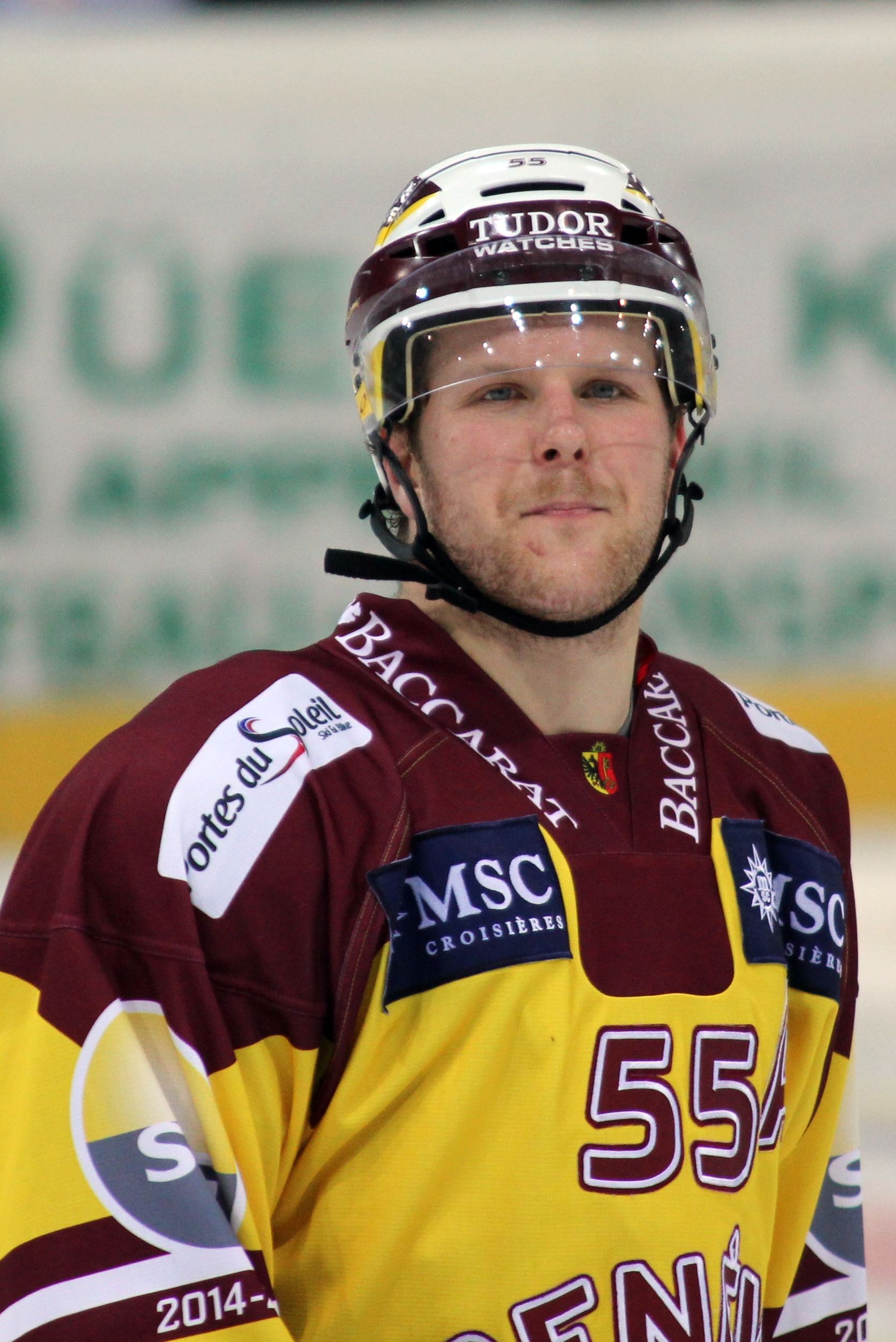
- Born: February 19, 1986 (age 40) North York, Ontario, Canada
- Height: 6 ft 3 in (191 cm)
- Weight: 220 lb (100 kg; 15 st 10 lb)
- Position: Defence
- Shot: Right
- Played for: Genève-Servette HC; SC Rapperswil-Jona Lakers
- NHL draft: Undrafted
- Playing career: 2008–2021

Medal record

Ice hockey

Representing Canada

Spengler Cup
Gold medal – first place	2016 Davos	
Gold medal – first place	2015 Davos	

Daniel Vukovic (born February 19, 1986) is a Canadian-Swiss former professional ice hockey defenceman who played for Genève-Servette HC and SC Rapperswil-Jona Lakers in the National League (NL). He has dual citizenship in Canada and Switzerland.

== Playing career ==
A native of North York, Ontario and a graduate of St. Michael's College School in Toronto, Ontario, Vukovic enrolled at Michigan State University in 2004 and won the men's national collegiate ice hockey championship with the Spartans in 2007. As a senior (2007–08), he earned All-CCHA Honorable Mention status and won the hardest shot competition at the NCAA Skills Challenge. He graduated in 2008. Subsequently, he turned pro and signed with Genève-Servette HC of the Swiss top-flight National League A (NLA). He made his debut for the club during the 2008–09 NLA season. Vukovic reached the NLA playoffs with Servette in 2009-10 and in 2013 and 2014, he won the Spengler Cup with the team. In June 2015, he signed a new contract extension that will keep him at the club through the 2018–19 season.

Vukovic ended his 11-year tenure with Genève-Servette HC at the conclusion of the 2019 playoffs. He played a total of 472 regular season games with Geneva, putting up 82 points and appeared in 79 playoffs games, scoring 13 points. Vukovic also played 11 Champions Hockey League games with the team and 12 Swiss Cup games (5 points). He quickly became a fan favorite in Geneva for his dedication on the ice and his friendship off the ice.

In late March 2019, he signed with the SC Rapperswil-Jona Lakers.

== International play ==
In December 2015, Vukovic won the Spengler Cup with Team Canada.
