= Guerrilla burlesque =

Guerrilla Burlesque has become a part of San Francisco burlesque culture since 2005. "Guerrilla Burlesque" occurs when a burlesque act happens spontaneously at a show or when burlesque performers descend upon a show to which they were uninvited, thereby finding their way onto the stage. The term was coined in the summer of 2005 by Cherry Lix, a burlesque solo artist based in San Francisco.

The first guerrilla burlesque event was performed with Cherry Lix's suggestion by Diamond Daggers, a San Francisco burlesque troupe, at Jim Sweeney's (Kingfish) 2005 birthday party at the DNA Lounge in San Francisco. The Kingfish is one of the largest burlesque producers in San Francisco. After the troupe was successful with the Kingfish, Daisy Delight suggested that they guerrilla the Sisters of Perpetual Indulgence's Easter Picnic in the Park, a yearly event in San Francisco's Dolores Park. Later that fall, four members of Diamond Daggers "guerrillaed" on various street corners in the Castro, a popular gay neighborhood in San Francisco.

In February 2006, Cherry Lix and Daisy Delight started Twilight Vixen Revue, a new gay burlesque troupe, and they have continued the guerrilla burlesque tradition, most recently descending upon Miz Margo's birthday party at the DNA Lounge in July 2006.

This style of burlesque epitomizes the "Neo-Burlesque" or "new burlesque" style of performance, by taking traditional-styled burlesque performance and aggressively bringing it to unsuspecting, modern crowds.

== See also ==
- Guerrilla Warfare - the origin of the "guerrilla" term
