= 2008 Michigan presidential primary =

The Michigan presidential primary may refer to:

- Michigan Democratic primary, 2008
- Michigan Republican primary, 2008
