= Michigan–Michigan State men's ice hockey rivalry =

College ice hockey rivalry

- Michigan Wolverines Michigan State Spartans
- First meeting: January 11, 1922; Michigan 5, Michigan State 1
- Latest meeting: November 21, 2026; Michigan State 2, Michigan State 0
- Next meeting: February 5, 2027
- Trophy: The Iron D

Statistics
- Total meetings: 353
- All-time series: Michigan leads, 182–147–24
- Largest victory: Michigan, 17–1 (1950)
- Longest win streak: Michigan, 19 (1928–1954)
- Longest unbeaten streak: Michigan, 33 (1928–1957)
- Current win streak: Michigan State, 1 (2026–present)

The Michigan–Michigan State men's ice hockey rivalry is a college ice hockey rivalry between Michigan Wolverines men's ice hockey and Michigan State Spartans men's ice hockey that is part of the larger intrastate rivalry between the University of Michigan and Michigan State University. It constitutes the most-played rivalry in college hockey. The rivalry between the Spartans and Wolverines notably includes football and basketball rivalries, although it extends to almost all sports and many other forms of achievement.

The most notable examples of the hockey rivalry are two outdoor games, the October 6, 2001 Cold War in East Lansing and the December 11, 2010 Big Chill at the Big House in Ann Arbor, which set the world record for attendance at a hockey game. This record however was broken four years later at the 2014 NHL Winter Classic on January 1, 2014. As of 2013, both teams are members of the Big Ten Conference, although they have previously competed together in both the Central Collegiate Hockey Association (CCHA) and the Western Collegiate Hockey Association (WCHA). Michigan went 37–1–1 against Michigan State from 1925 until 1957.

== History ==
The regular home arenas for the teams are Yost Ice Arena (capacity 5,800) and Munn Ice Arena (capacity 6,114). The two schools play at least four times a year through conference play, and with regularity play a fifth game in the Great Lakes Invitational. It is possible for the teams to meet nine times throughout the season with regular season, GLI, Big Ten tournament and NCAA tournament games. The teams often play games on neutral sites and have played at least once per year since 1990 in Detroit, starting at Joe Louis Arena (capacity 20,066). The teams generally alternate years in which they hold a home game in the city. Beginning during the 2015–16 season, the winner of each game at Joe Louis Arena receives the Iron D Trophy. The last contest at Joe Louis Arena was on February 10, 2017, with Little Caesars Arena (capacity 19,515) replacing Joe Louis Arena entirely.

Since the Little Caesars Arena's hockey configuration capacity exceeds that of all regular collegiate hockey home venues as well as the Beanpot Tournament host venue, TD Garden, the annual game at LCA is among the most attended college hockey games each year, rivaled only by the Frozen Four.

During the 2023–24 season, Michigan and Michigan State faced each other in the NCAA tournament for the first time in the history of the rivalry. Michigan defeated Michigan State 5–2 to advance to their third consecutive Frozen Four.

An element of the rivalry is that Michigan (1964, 1992*, 1993* and 2018) and Michigan State (1999 and 2001) are the only two schools to have had both their hockey team and basketball team qualify for the Final Four of the NCAA men's ice hockey championship and NCAA Division I men's basketball tournament in the same season.

== Duel in the D series ==
Michigan and Michigan State meet once a year in Detroit for a neutral site game. Michigan gets home team designation in even years, while Michigan State gets home team designation in odd years. Michigan leads the Duel in the D series 19–14–5. In 2016, the teams started competing for the Iron D trophy, Michigan has won the trophy five times, while Michigan State has won four times.

Michigan victories	Michigan State victories	Tie games

No.	Date	Location	Winner	Score
1	February 15, 1991	Detroit, MI	Michigan	6–5
2	February 16, 1991	Detroit, MI	Michigan State	6–2
3	February 21, 1992	Detroit, MI	Michigan	4–1
4	February 22, 1992	Detroit, MI	Michigan	5–4
5	January 30, 1993	Detroit, MI	Michigan	11–1
6	February 19, 1994	Detroit, MI	Michigan State	5–1
7	February 18, 1995	Detroit, MI	Michigan	7–1
8	February 17, 1996	Detroit, MI	Michigan	8–1
9	February 2, 1997	Detroit, MI	Michigan State	2–1
10	February 21, 1998	Detroit, MI	Michigan State	4–1
11	February 20, 1999	Detroit, MI	Michigan State	3–1
12	February 26, 2000	Detroit, MI	Tie	3–3
13	January 27, 2001	Detroit, MI	Michigan	4–3^{OT}
14	February 17, 2001	Detroit, MI	Michigan State	4–2
15	February 16, 2002	Detroit, MI	Michigan State	3–1
16	January 3, 2003	Detroit, MI	Michigan	5–4
17	June 3, 2004	Detroit, MI	Michigan State	1–0
18	May 2, 2005	Detroit, MI	Tie	1–1
19	January 28, 2006	Detroit, MI	Tie	5–5
20	October 2, 2007	Detroit, MI	Tie	3–3

No.	Date	Location	Winner	Score
21	February 23, 2008	Detroit, MI	Michigan	5–2
22	January 23, 2009	Detroit, MI	Michigan	6–2
23	January 30, 2010	Detroit, MI	Michigan	5–4
24	January 29, 2011	Detroit, MI	Michigan State	2–1
25	November 2, 2012	Detroit, MI	Michigan	3–2
26	February 2, 2013	Detroit, MI	Michigan	5–2
27	January 23, 2014	Detroit, MI	Michigan	2–1
28	January 30, 2015	Detroit, MI	Michigan State	2–1
29	February 5, 2016	Detroit, MI	Michigan State	3–2
30	February 10, 2017	Detroit, MI	Tie	4–4
31	February 10, 2018	Detroit, MI	Michigan	3–2
32	February 9, 2019	Detroit, MI	Michigan	5–2
33	February 18, 2020	Detroit, MI	Michigan	4–1
34	February 12, 2022	Detroit, MI	No. 4 Michigan	7–3
35	February 11, 2023	Detroit, MI	No. 5 Michigan	4–3^{OT}
36	February 10, 2024	Detroit, MI	No. 9 Michigan State	3–2
37	February 8, 2025	Detroit, MI	No. 2 Michigan State	6–1
38	February 7, 2026	Detroit, MI	No. 2 Michigan State	5–2
Series: Michigan leads 19–14–5

== Game results ==
Full game results for the rivalry, with rankings beginning in the 1995–96 season.

Michigan victories	Michigan State victories	Tie games

No.	Date	Location	Winner	Score
1	1925	East Lansing, MI	Michigan	6–3
2	1926	Ann Arbor, MI	Michigan	4–0
3	1926	East Lansing, MI	Michigan	4–1
4	1927	East Lansing, MI	Michigan	2–0
5	1927	Ann Arbor, MI	Michigan	2–1^{OT}
6	1928	East Lansing, MI	Michigan State	2–1
7	1928	Ann Arbor, MI	Michigan	3–1
8	1929	Ann Arbor, MI	Michigan	9–1
9	1929	East Lansing, MI	Michigan	8–2
10	1930	East Lansing, MI	Michigan	7–0
11	1930	Ann Arbor, MI	Michigan	7–1
12	1950	East Lansing, MI	Michigan	10–4
13	1950	Ann Arbor, MI	Michigan	17–1
14	1951	East Lansing, MI	Michigan	10–1
15	1951	Ann Arbor, MI	Michigan	9–6
16	1951	East Lansing, MI	Michigan	11–1
17	1952	Ann Arbor, MI	Michigan	7–1
18	1952	East Lansing, MI	Michigan	8–2
19	1952	Ann Arbor, MI	Michigan	6–2
20	1953	East Lansing, MI	Michigan	6–0
21	1953	Ann Arbor, MI	Michigan	10–2
22	1953	Ann Arbor, MI	Michigan	4–0
23	1953	East Lansing, MI	Michigan	8–4
24	1954	East Lansing, MI	Michigan	7–4
25	1954	Ann Arbor, MI	Michigan	3–1
26	1954	East Lansing, MI	Tie	0–0
27	1954	Ann Arbor, MI	Michigan	3–2
28	1955	East Lansing, MI	Michigan	7–0
29	1955	Ann Arbor, MI	Michigan	3–1
30	1955	East Lansing, MI	Michigan	7–4
31	1955	Ann Arbor, MI	Michigan	4–3
32	1956	East Lansing, MI	Michigan	5–2
33	1956	Ann Arbor, MI	Michigan	3–1
34	1956	East Lansing, MI	Michigan	3–2^{OT}
35	1956	Ann Arbor, MI	Michigan	7–1
36	1957	East Lansing, MI	Michigan	4–3
37	1957	Ann Arbor, MI	Michigan	3–2
38	1957	East Lansing, MI	Michigan	5–4
39	1957	Ann Arbor, MI	Michigan	2–1
40	1958	East Lansing, MI	Michigan State	4–2
41	1958	Ann Arbor, MI	Michigan	4–2
42	1958	East Lansing, MI	Michigan State	3–1
43	1958	Ann Arbor, MI	Michigan State	2–1^{OT}
44	1959	East Lansing, MI	Michigan State	3–1
45	1959	Ann Arbor, MI	Michigan State	5–2
46	1959	East Lansing, MI	Michigan	4–2
47	1959	Ann Arbor, MI	Michigan State	4–1
48	1960	Ann Arbor, MI	Michigan	6–1
49	1960	East Lansing, MI	Michigan State	4–2
50	1960	East Lansing, MI	Michigan State	4–3^{OT}
51	1960	Ann Arbor, MI	Michigan	5–3
52	1961	East Lansing, MI	Michigan State	3–2
53	1961	Ann Arbor, MI	Michigan	3–2^{OT}
54	1961	East Lansing, MI	Michigan	6–1
55	1961	Ann Arbor, MI	Michigan	4–3
56	1962	East Lansing, MI	Michigan	5–3
57	1962	Ann Arbor, MI	Michigan	5–1
58	1962	East Lansing, MI	Michigan	4–2
59	1962	Ann Arbor, MI	Michigan	10–2

No.	Date	Location	Winner	Score
60	1962	Ann Arbor, MI	Michigan State	2–1^{OT}
61	1962	Ann Arbor, MI	Michigan State	4–3
62	1963	East Lansing, MI	Michigan State	6–2
63	1963	East Lansing, MI	Michigan State	2–1
64	1964	East Lansing, MI	Michigan	2–0
65	1964	Ann Arbor, MI	Michigan	7–2
66	1964	East Lansing, MI	Michigan	9–4
67	1964	Ann Arbor, MI	Michigan	13–4
68	1965	East Lansing, MI	Michigan	6–3
69	1965	Ann Arbor, MI	Michigan State	7–4
70	1965	East Lansing, MI	Michigan State	6–2
71	1965	Ann Arbor, MI	Michigan	7–2
72	1966	East Lansing, MI	Michigan State	8–7
73	1966	Ann Arbor, MI	Michigan State	4–2
74	1966	East Lansing, MI	Michigan State	7–1
75	1966	Ann Arbor, MI	Michigan	1–0^{OT}
76	1966	Ann Arbor, MI	Michigan State	3–2
77	1966	East Lansing, MI	Michigan	10–4
78	1966	Ann Arbor, MI	Michigan	3–2
79	1966	Detroit, MI	Michigan	5–3
80	1967	Ann Arbor, MI	Michigan State	4–3
81	1967	East Lansing, MI	Michigan State	5–1
82	1967	East Lansing, MI	Michigan State	4–2
83	1968	Ann Arbor, MI	Michigan	7–1
84	1968	East Lansing, MI	Michigan State	4–3^{OT}
85	1968	East Lansing, MI	Michigan	4–3^{OT}
86	1968	Ann Arbor, MI	Michigan	9–0
87	1968	Ann Arbor, MI	Michigan	2–1
88	1968	East Lansing, MI	Michigan	2–1
89	1968	Detroit, MI	Michigan State	4–2
90	1968	Madison, WI	Michigan	8–3
91	1969	East Lansing, MI	Michigan State	7–3
92	1969	Ann Arbor, MI	Michigan State	5–1
93	1969	Ann Arbor, MI	Michigan State	3–2
94	1969	East Lansing, MI	Michigan	8–6
95	1969	Ann Arbor, MI	Michigan State	5–4
96	1970	East Lansing, MI	Michigan	6–3
97	1970	Ann Arbor, MI	Michigan State	7–1
98	1971	East Lansing, MI	Michigan State	5–4
99	1971	Ann Arbor, MI	Michigan State	6–5
100	1971	Ann Arbor, MI	Michigan	8–7^{OT}
101	1971	East Lansing, MI	Michigan State	5–4^{OT}
102	1971	East Lansing, MI	Michigan	5–1
103	1971	Ann Arbor, MI	Michigan State	4–2
104	1972	East Lansing, MI	Michigan State	7–2
105	1972	Ann Arbor, MI	Michigan	6–2
106	1973	Ann Arbor, MI	Michigan State	5–2
107	1973	East Lansing, MI	Michigan State	6–5
108	1973	Ann Arbor, MI	Michigan State	8–5
109	1973	East Lansing, MI	Michigan State	8–3
110	1973	Ann Arbor, MI	Michigan	7–6
111	1973	East Lansing, MI	Michigan State	7–6^{OT}
112	1974	East Lansing, MI	Michigan State	6–2
113	1974	Ann Arbor, MI	Michigan State	9–3
114	1974	East Lansing, MI	Michigan State	6–1
115	1974	Ann Arbor, MI	Michigan State	8–3
116	1975	Ann Arbor, MI	Michigan	11–8
117	1975	East Lansing, MI	Michigan	7–5
118	1975	Ann Arbor, MI	Michigan State	6–4

No.	Date	Location	Winner	Score
119	1975	East Lansing, MI	Michigan	8–4
120	1976	East Lansing, MI	Michigan State	6–3
121	1976	Ann Arbor, MI	Michigan	7–6
122	1976	East Lansing, MI	Michigan State	7–5
123	1976	Ann Arbor, MI	Michigan State	6–5^{OT}
124	1977	Ann Arbor, MI	Michigan	6–3
125	1977	East Lansing, MI	Michigan	5–2
126	1977	Ann Arbor, MI	Michigan	8–4
127	1977	East Lansing, MI	Michigan State	9–4
128	1978	East Lansing, MI	Tie	7–7
129	1978	Ann Arbor, MI	Michigan	3–2
130	1978	East Lansing, MI	Michigan	7–4
131	1978	Ann Arbor, MI	Michigan	5–2
132	1979	Ann Arbor, MI	Michigan State	5–3
133	1979	East Lansing, MI	Michigan State	5–3
134	1979	Ann Arbor, MI	Michigan	7–2
135	1979	East Lansing, MI	Michigan State	6–3
136	1979	Detroit, MI	Michigan	7–4
137	1980	East Lansing, MI	Michigan State	5–4
138	1980	Ann Arbor, MI	Michigan	6–1
139	1980	East Lansing, MI	Michigan	2–1
140	1980	Ann Arbor, MI	Michigan	3–2^{OT}
141	1980	Detroit, MI	Michigan	3–2
142	1981	Ann Arbor, MI	Michigan	9–2
143	1981	East Lansing, MI	Michigan State	4–3
144	1981	Ann Arbor, MI	Michigan	4–3
145	1981	East Lansing, MI	Michigan State	3–0
146	1981	Detroit, MI	Tie	4–4
147	1982	Ann Arbor, MI	Michigan State	5–2
148	1982	East Lansing, MI	Michigan State	7–1
149	1982	Ann Arbor, MI	Michigan State	5–2
150	1982	East Lansing, MI	Michigan State	4–3
151	1982	Detroit, MI	Michigan State	6–3
152	1983	East Lansing, MI	Michigan State	3–1
153	1983	Ann Arbor, MI	Michigan State	2–1
154	1983	Ann Arbor, MI	Michigan State	6–3
155	1983	East Lansing, MI	Michigan	5–3
156	1984	East Lansing, MI	Michigan State	12–1
157	1984	Ann Arbor, MI	Michigan State	3–1
158	1984	Ann Arbor, MI	Michigan State	4–1
159	1984	East Lansing, MI	Michigan State	8–2
160	1985	East Lansing, MI	Michigan State	11–2
161	1985	Ann Arbor, MI	Michigan State	9–4
162	1985	Ann Arbor, MI	Michigan	5–4
163	1985	East Lansing, MI	Michigan State	6–2
164	1986	East Lansing, MI	Michigan State	7–5
165	1986	Ann Arbor, MI	Michigan	5–3
166	1986	East Lansing, MI	Michigan State	4–3
167	1986	East Lansing, MI	Michigan State	5–2
168	1986	Ann Arbor, MI	Michigan State	7–6
169	1986	East Lansing, MI	Michigan State	9–3
170	1987	East Lansing, MI	Michigan	8–2
171	1987	Ann Arbor, MI	Michigan State	2–1
172	1987	East Lansing, MI	Michigan State	8–7^{OT}
173	1987	East Lansing, MI	Michigan State	6–3
174	1987	East Lansing, MI	Michigan State	6–3
175	1987	Ann Arbor, MI	Michigan	6–4
176	1988	Ann Arbor, MI	Michigan	5–2
177	1988	East Lansing, MI	Michigan	5–3

No.	Date	Location	Winner	Score
178	1988	Ann Arbor, MI	Michigan State	3–0
179	1988	East Lansing, MI	Michigan State	5–3
180	1989	East Lansing, MI	Michigan State	7–3
181	1989	Ann Arbor, MI	Michigan State	5–3
182	1989	Ann Arbor, MI	Michigan State	5–3
183	1989	East Lansing, MI	Michigan State	11–4
184	1989	Detroit, MI	Michigan	6–3
185	1990	East Lansing, MI	Tie	2–2
186	1990	Ann Arbor, MI	Michigan State	5–2
187	1990	Detroit, MI	Michigan State	4–3^{OT}
188	1990	Ann Arbor, MI	Michigan	4–2
189	1990	East Lansing, MI	Tie	3–3
190	1991	Detroit, MI	Michigan	6–5
191	1991	Detroit, MI	Michigan State	6–2
192	1991	East Lansing, MI	Michigan State	5–3
193	1991	Ann Arbor, MI	Tie	4–4
194	1992	Detroit, MI	Michigan	4–1
195	1992	Detroit, MI	Michigan	5–4
196	1992	Ann Arbor, MI	Michigan	4–3
197	1992	East Lansing, MI	Michigan State	3–1
198	1993	Detroit, MI	Michigan	11–1
199	1993	Detroit, MI	Michigan	4–2
200	1994	Ann Arbor, MI	Michigan State	6–3
201	1994	East Lansing, MI	Michigan	3–1
202	1994	Detroit, MI	Michigan State	5–1
203	1994	Ann Arbor, MI	Michigan	7–3
204	1994	Detroit, MI	Michigan	5–4
205	1995	East Lansing, MI	Michigan	5–3
206	1995	Detroit, MI	Michigan	7–1
207	1995	East Lansing, MI	Michigan State	4–3
208	1995	Detroit, MI	No. 4 Michigan	3–1
209	1996	Detroit, MI	No. 4 Michigan	8–1
210	1996	Ann Arbor, MI	No. 5 Michigan	3–0
211	1996	Detroit, MI	No. 2 Michigan	6–2
212	1996	East Lansing, MI	No. 9 Michigan State	5–4
213	1996	Ann Arbor, MI	No. 1 Michigan	5–1
214	1997	Detroit, MI	No. 8 Michigan State	2–1
215	1997	Detroit, MI	No. 1 Michigan	3–1
216	1997	Ann Arbor, MI	No. 2 Michigan State	4–2
217	1997	Detroit, MI	No. 2 Michigan State	5–3
218	1998	East Lansing, MI	No. 2 Michigan State	5–1
219	1998	Detroit, MI	No. 2 Michigan State	4–1
220	1998	Ann Arbor, MI	No. 8 Michigan	2–1
221	1998	Detroit, MI	No. 6 Michigan State	3–1
222	1999	East Lansing, MI	Tie	3–3
223	1999	Detroit, MI	No. 5 Michigan State	3–1
224	1999	Detroit, MI	No. 5 Michigan State	3–1
225	2000	East Lansing, MI	No. 6 Michigan	2–0
226	2000	Ann Arbor, MI	No. 5 Michigan	4–2
227	2000	Detroit, MI	Tie	3–3
228	2000	Ann Arbor, MI	No. 6 Michigan State	1–0
229	2001	Detroit, MI	No. 7 Michigan	4–3^{OT}
230	2001	Detroit, MI	No. 1 Michigan State	4–2
231	2001	East Lansing, MI	No. 1 Michigan State	3–1
232	2001	Detroit, MI	No. 1 Michigan State	2–0
233	2001	East Lansing, MI	Tie	3–3
234	2002	Ann Arbor, MI	Tie	1–1
235	2002	Detroit, MI	No. 5 Michigan State	3–1
236	2002	Detroit, MI	No. 9 Michigan	3–2

No.	Date	Location	Winner	Score
237	2003	Ann Arbor, MI	No. 8 Michigan	3–1
238	2003	East Lansing, MI	Michigan State	5–3
239	2003	Ann Arbor, MI	Michigan State	4–0
240	2003	Detroit, MI	No. 8 Michigan	5–4
241	2003	Ann Arbor, MI	No. 10 Michigan	2–0
242	2003	East Lansing, MI	Michigan State	2–0
243	2004	East Lansing, MI	Tie	4–4
244	2004	Detroit, MI	No. 14 Michigan State	1–0
245	2004	East Lansing, MI	No. 2 Michigan	4–2
246	2004	Ann Arbor, MI	No. 2 Michigan	5–4
247	2004	Detroit, MI	Michigan State	2–1^{OT}
248	2005	Ann Arbor, MI	Tie	2–2
249	2005	Detroit, MI	Tie	1–1
250	2005	Ann Arbor, MI	Tie	3–3
251	2006	East Lansing, MI	No. 19 Michigan State	2–0
252	2006	East Lansing, MI	Tie	1–1
253	2006	Detroit, MI	Tie	5–5
254	2006	Detroit, MI	No. 5 Michigan State	4–1
255	2006	East Lansing, MI	No. 6 Michigan State	7–4
256	2006	Ann Arbor, MI	No. 9 Michigan	6–2
257	2006	Ann Arbor, MI	No. 7 Michigan	2–1
258	2006	Detroit, MI	No. 14 Michigan State	4–1
259	2007	Detroit, MI	Tie	3–3
260	2007	Detroit, MI	No. 9 Michigan	5–2
261	2008	Ann Arbor, MI	No. 6 Michigan State	1–0
262	2008	East Lansing, MI	Tie	2–2
263	2008	East Lansing, MI	No. 6 Michigan State	5–2
264	2008	Detroit, MI	No. 1 Michigan	5–2
265	2008	Ann Arbor, MI	No. 14 Michigan	6–1
266	2008	East Lansing, MI	No. 14 Michigan	5–3
267	2008	Detroit, MI	No. 12 Michigan	5–1
268	2009	Detroit, MI	No. 8 Michigan	6–2
269	2009	Ann Arbor, MI	No. 8 Michigan	5–3
270	2009	Ann Arbor, MI	No. 13 Michigan State	3–2
271	2009	East Lansing, MI	No. 13 Michigan State	2–0
272	2010	East Lansing, MI	No. 12 Michigan State	3–2
273	2010	Detroit, MI	No. 20 Michigan	5–4
274	2010	East Lansing, MI	Michigan	5–1
275	2010	East Lansing, MI	Michigan	5–3
276	2010	Ann Arbor, MI	No. 12 Michigan	5–0
277	2011	East Lansing, MI	Michigan State	4–3^{OT}
278	2011	Ann Arbor, MI	No. 7 Michigan	4–0
279	2011	Detroit, MI	Michigan State	2–1
280	2011	Ann Arbor, MI	Michigan	4–3
281	2011	East Lansing, MI	Tie	3–3
282	2011	Detroit, MI	No. 20 Michigan	3–2^{OT}
283	2012	East Lansing, MI	No. 17 Michigan State	3–2
284	2012	Detroit, MI	No. 4 Michigan	3–2^{OT}
285	2012	Ann Arbor, MI	No. 11 Michigan	5–1
286	2012	East Lansing, MI	Michigan State	7–2
287	2012	Detroit, MI	Michigan	5–2
288	2013	Ann Arbor, MI	Michigan	3–2
289	2013	Detroit, MI	Michigan	5–2
290	2013	Detroit, MI	Michigan State	3–0
291	2014	Detroit, MI	No. 14 Michigan	2–1
292	2014	East Lansing, MI	No. 14 Michigan	5–2
293	2014	Ann Arbor, MI	No. 12 Michigan	7–1
294	2014	East Lansing, MI	Michigan State	4–3
295	2014	Detroit, MI	Michigan	2–1

No.	Date	Location	Winner	Score
296	2015	Detroit, MI	Michigan State	2–1
297	2015	Chicago, IL	No. 14 Michigan	4–1
298	2015	East Lansing, MI	No. 19 Michigan	5–3
299	2015	Ann Arbor, MI	Michigan State	2–1
300	2015	Detroit, MI	Michigan	4–1
301	2016	East Lansing, MI	No. 8 Michigan	9–2
302	2016	Ann Arbor, MI	No. 8 Michigan	6–3
303	2016	Detroit, MI	Michigan State	3–2^{OT}
304	2016	East Lansing, MI	No. 5 Michigan	4–1
305	2016	Detroit, MI	Michigan	5–4^{OT}
306	2017	Ann Arbor, MI	Michigan State	3–0
307	2017	East Lansing, MI	Tie	2–2
308	2017	Detroit, MI	Tie	4–4
309	2017	Ann Arbor, MI	Michigan State	4–1
310	2017	Ann Arbor, MI	Michigan	4–0
311	2017	East Lansing, MI	Michigan State	5–0
312	2018	Detroit, MI	Michigan	6–4
313	2018	East Lansing, MI	Tie	1–1
314	2018	Detroit, MI	No. 19 Michigan	3–2
315	2018	East Lansing, MI	Michigan State	4–3
316	2018	Ann Arbor, MI	Tie	2–2
317	2018	Detroit, MI	Tie	2–2
318	2019	Ann Arbor, MI	Michigan	5–3
319	2019	Detroit, MI	Michigan	5–2
320	2019	Ann Arbor, MI	Michigan State	4–3
321	2019	East Lansing, MI	Michigan State	3–0
322	2020	East Lansing, MI	Michigan	5–1
323	2020	Detroit, MI	Michigan	4–1
324	2020	Ann Arbor, MI	Michigan	3–0
325	2020	Ann Arbor, MI	Michigan	3–0
326	2021	Ann Arbor, MI	No. 9 Michigan	9–0
327	2021	East Lansing, MI	Michigan State	3–2
328	2021	Ann Arbor, MI	No. 3 Michigan	7–2
329	2021	East Lansing, MI	No. 3 Michigan	3–2
330	2022	Ann Arbor, MI	No. 4 Michigan	6–2
331	2022	Detroit, MI	No. 4 Michigan	7–3
332	2022	Ann Arbor, MI	No. 5 Michigan	4–1
333	2022	Ann Arbor, MI	No. 5 Michigan	8–0
334	2022	East Lansing, MI	No. 12 Michigan State	2–1
335	2022	Ann Arbor, MI	No. 6 Michigan	2–1
336	2023	East Lansing, MI	No. 5 Michigan	4–2
337	2023	Detroit, MI	No. 5 Michigan	4–3^{OT}
338	2024	East Lansing, MI	No. 15 Michigan	7–1
339	2024	Ann Arbor, MI	No. 7 Michigan State	7–5
340	2024	Ann Arbor, MI	No. 11 Michigan State	5–1
341	2024	Detroit, MI	No. 9 Michigan State	3–2
342	2024	East Lansing, MI	No. 5 Michigan State	5–4^{OT}
343	2024	Maryland Heights, MO	No. 10 Michigan	5–2
344	2025	Ann Arbor, MI	No. 10 Michigan	3–2^{OT}
345	2025	East Lansing, MI	No. 1 Michigan State	4–1
346	2025	East Lansing, MI	No. 13 Michigan	2–1
347	2025	Detroit, MI	No. 2 Michigan State	6–1
348	2025	East Lansing, MI	No. 1 Michigan	3–0
349	2025	Ann Arbor, MI	No. 3 Michigan State	3–1
350	2026	Ann Arbor, MI	No. 1 Michigan	4–3^{OT}
351	2026	Detroit, MI	No. 2 Michigan State	5–2
352	2026	Ann Arbor, MI	No. 1 Michigan	5–1
353	2026	East Lansing, MI	No. 9 Michigan State	2–0
Series: Michigan leads 182–147–24
