= 2003 Grand Rapids mayoral election =

Local election in Grand Rapids, Michigan

← 1999	September 9, 2003	2007 →
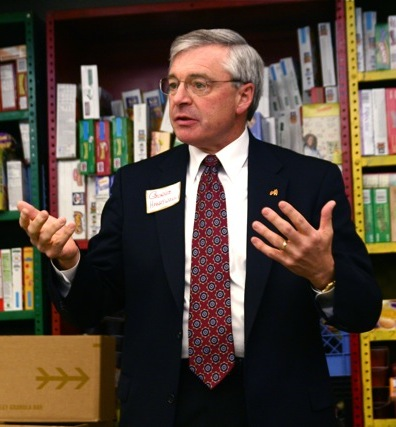
Candidate	George Heartwell	Barbara Sue Damore
Popular vote	12,330	1,657
Percentage	83.82%	11.26%
Mayor before election
John H. Logie
Nonpartisan
Elected mayor
George Heartwell
Nonpartisan

The 2003 Grand Rapids mayoral election was held on September 9, 2003. Incumbent Mayor John H. Logie declined to run for re-election to a fourth term. Former City Commissioner George Heartwell ended up winning the ensuing election with 84 percent of the vote after he faced only token opposition.

== Candidates ==
- George Heartwell, former City Commissioner
- Barbara Sue Damore, businesswoman, 1995 and 1999 candidate for the City Commission
- Richa, local activist

== Campaign ==
On July 9, 2002, Mayor John H. Logie announced that he would not seek a fourth term. Former City Commissioner George Heartwell was the first to announce his campaign on September 30, 2002, and State Senator Glenn Steil and City Commissioner Scott Bowen formed exploratory committees. However, Steil announced on January 9, 2003, that he wouldn't run, saying, "I don't have fire in my belly." Later that year, Bowen also declined to run, citing family considerations.

When candidate filing closed, Heartwell had two opponents: businesswoman Barbara Sue Damore and activist Richa. Neither candidate attracted wide support, and Heartwell raised and spent significantly more than both combined. Heartwell ultimately defeated both in a landslide, winning 84 percent of the vote to Damore's 11 percent and Richa's 5 percent, avoiding the need for a runoff election.

== Results ==
2003 Grand Rapids mayoral election
Party	Candidate	Votes	%
Nonpartisan	George Heartwell	12,330	83.82%
Nonpartisan	Barbara Sue Damore	1,657	11.26%
Nonpartisan	Richa	723	4.92%
Total votes		14,710	100.00%
