= 2019 Grand Rapids mayoral election =

Local election in Grand Rapids, Michigan

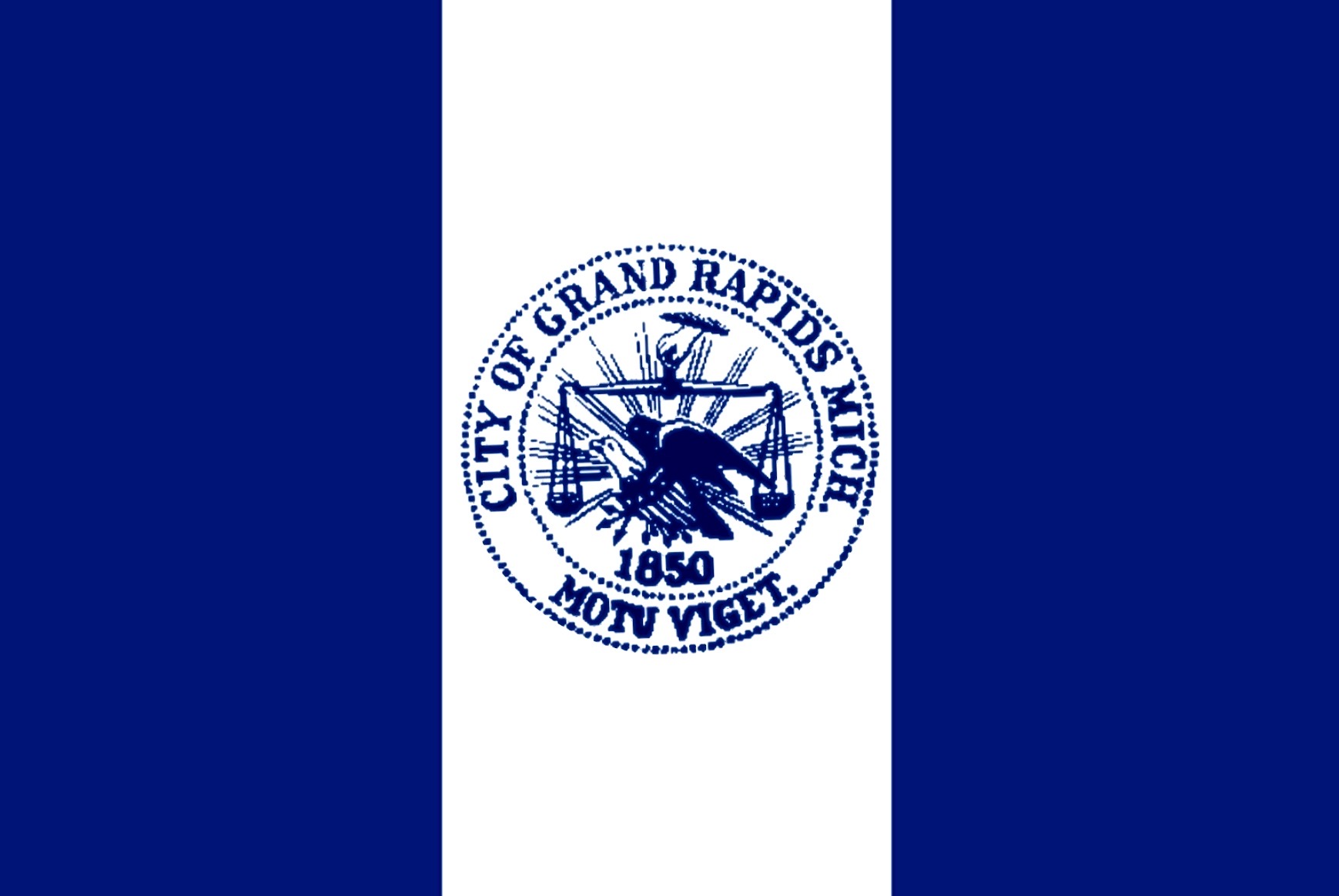
← 2015	November 5, 2019	2024 →
- Turnout: 20.58%

Candidate	Rosalynn Bliss	Daniel Allen Schutte
Party	Nonpartisan	Nonpartisan
Popular vote	23,717	4,476
Percentage	83.88%	15.83%
- Precinct results Bliss: 60–70% 70–80% 80–90% >90% No votes
Mayor before election
Rosalynn Bliss
Elected mayor
Rosalynn Bliss

The 2019 Grand Rapids mayoral election took place on November 5, 2019. Incumbent Mayor Rosalynn Bliss ran for re-election to a second term. She was challenged by pastor Daniel Schutte, a 2018 Republican candidate for the State House. Because only two candidates filed, the August primary election was cancelled. Bliss defeated Schutte in a landslide, winning 84 percent of the vote to Schotte's 16 percent.

This was the last mayoral election to take place in an odd-numbered year following the passage of a 2020 charter amendment that moved mayoral elections to presidential election years. As a result, Bliss's term was extended by a year.

== Candidates ==
- Rosalynn Bliss, incumbent Mayor
- Daniel Schutte, pastor, 2018 Republican candidate for the State House

== Primary election results ==
2019 Grand Rapids mayoral election
Party	Candidate	Votes	%
Nonpartisan	Rosalynn Bliss (inc.)	23,717	83.88%
Nonpartisan	Daniel Schutte	4,476	15.83%
Write-in		82	0.29%
Total votes		28,275	100.00%
