= 2011 Grand Rapids mayoral election =

Local election in Grand Rapids, Michigan

← 2007	November 8, 2011	2015 →
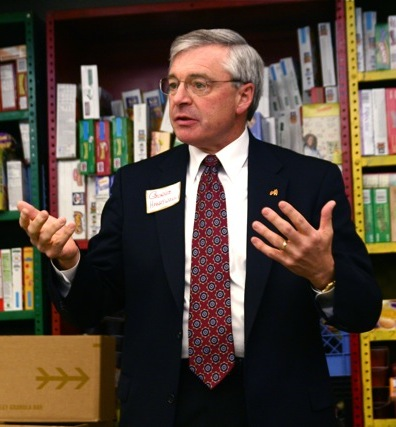
Candidate	George Heartwell	Michael-Paul A. Gionfriddo
Popular vote	14,132	3,228
Percentage	81.41%	18.59%
Mayor before election
George Heartwell
Nonpartisan
Elected mayor
George Heartwell
Nonpartisan

The 2011 Grand Rapids mayoral election was held on November 8, 2011. Incumbent Mayor George Heartwell ran for re-election. He did not face a serious challenger, and was opposed by unemployed personal trainer Michael-Paul Gionfriddo. Heartwell won his third term in a landslide, winning 81 percent of the vote.

== Primary election ==
=== Candidates ===
- George Heartwell, incumbent Mayor
- Michael-Paul A. Gionfriddo, personal trainer

=== Results ===
2011 Grand Rapids mayoral election
Party	Candidate	Votes	%
Nonpartisan	George Heartwell (inc.)	14,132	81.41%
Nonpartisan	Michael-Paul A. Gionfriddo	3,228	18.59%
Total votes		17,360	100.00%
