= 2007 Grand Rapids mayoral election =

Local election in Grand Rapids, Michigan

← 2003	August 7, 2007	2011 →
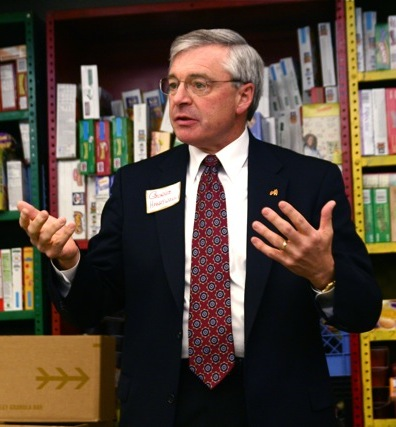
Candidate	George Heartwell	Rick Tormala	James Rinck
Popular vote	12,171	8,921	2,256
Percentage	50.72%	37.18%	9.40%
Mayor before election
George Heartwell
Nonpartisan
Elected mayor
George Heartwell
Nonpartisan

The 2007 Grand Rapids mayoral election was held on August 7, 2007. Incumbent Mayor George Heartwell ran for re-election to a second term. He was challenged by City Commissioner Rick Tormala and Grand Rapids Board of Education member James Rinck. Heartwell narrowly avoided a runoff election, winning 51 percent of the vote to Tormala's 37 percent and Rinck's 9 percent.

== Candidates ==
- George Heartwell, incumbent Mayor
- Rick Tormala, City Commissioner
- James Rinck, member of the Grand Rapids Board of Education
- Jackie Miller, grocery store cashier

== Results ==
2007 Grand Rapids mayoral election
Party	Candidate	Votes	%
Nonpartisan	George Heartwell (inc.)	12,171	50.72%
Nonpartisan	Rick Tormala	8,921	37.18%
Nonpartisan	James Rinck	2,256	9.40%
Nonpartisan	Jackie Miller	649	2.70%
Total votes		23,997	100.00%
