= 2024 Grand Rapids mayoral election =

Local election in Grand Rapids, Michigan

- August 6, 2024 (first round); November 5, 2024 (Runoff)
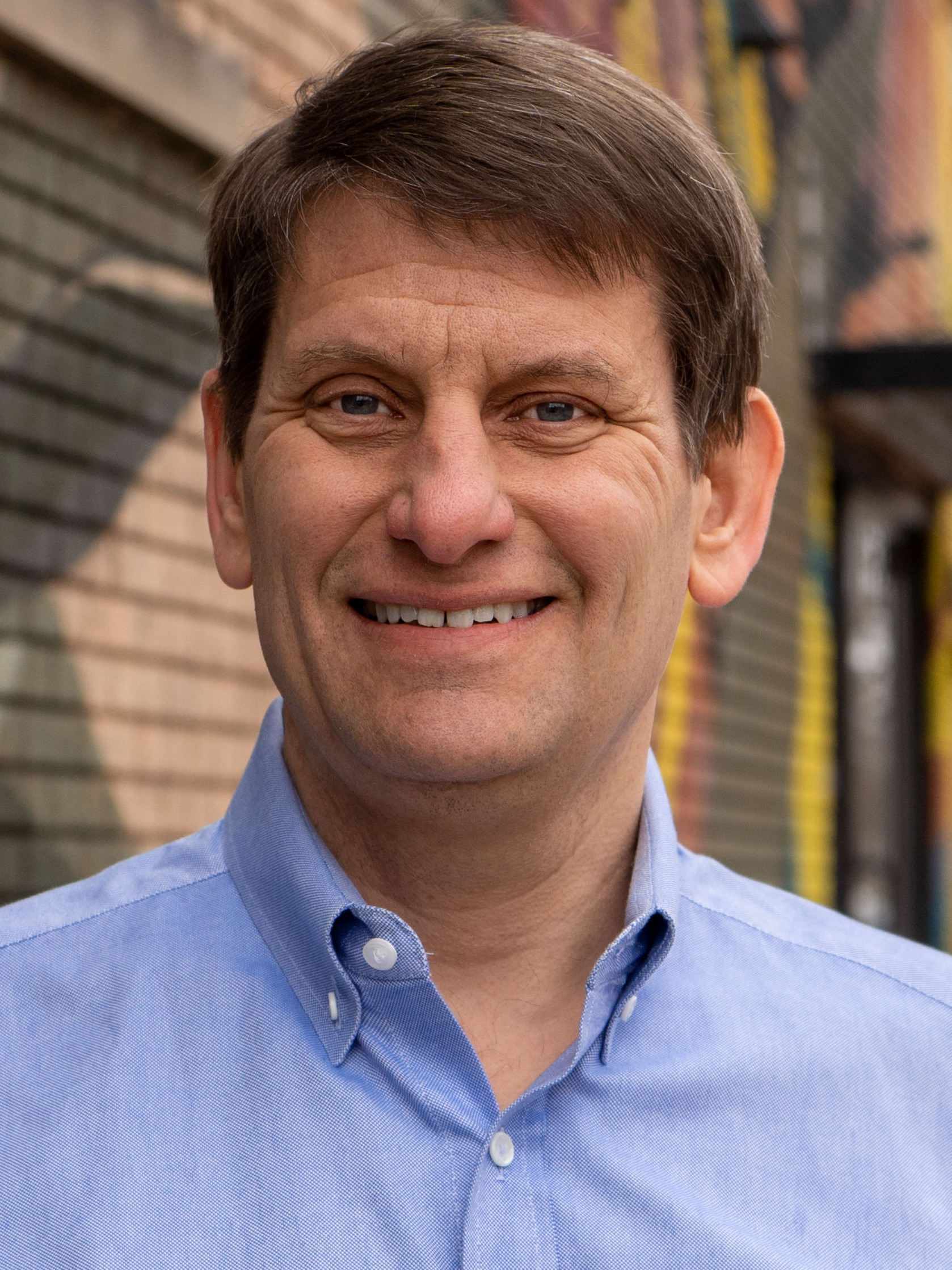

Candidate	David LaGrand	Senita Lenear	Steve Owens
First round	18,293; 59.81%	6,137; 20.06%	4,198; 13.72%
Runoff	50,508; 63.36%	29,211; 36.64%	Eliminated
Results by precinct
LaGrand
40–50%
50–60%
60–70%
70–80%
Lenear
50–60%
60–70%
Mayor before election
Rosalynn Bliss
Nonpartisan
Elected mayor
David LaGrand
Nonpartisan

The 2024 Grand Rapids mayoral election took place on November 5, 2024, following a primary election on August 6, 2024. Incumbent Mayor Rosalynn Bliss was ineligible to run for re-election to a third term. Former State Representative David LaGrand ran to succeed her, and placed first in the primary by a wide margin, winning 60 percent of the vote to former City Commissioner Senita Lenear's 20 percent. Both of them advanced to the general election, where LaGrand defeated Lenear, 63–37 percent, winning his first term as Mayor.

== Primary election ==
=== Candidates ===
- David LaGrand, former State Representative
- Senita Lenear, former City Commissioner
- Steve Owens, former U.S. Marine
- Hailey Lynch-Bastion, musician

=== Results ===
2024 Grand Rapids mayoral election
Party	Candidate	Votes	%
Nonpartisan	David LaGrand	18,293	59.81%
Nonpartisan	Senita Lenear	6,137	20.06%
Nonpartisan	Steve Owens	4,198	13.72%
Nonpartisan	Hailey Lynch-Bastion	1,851	6.05%
Write-in		108	0.35%
Total votes		30,587	100.00%

== General election ==
=== Results ===
2024 Grand Rapids mayoral election
Party	Candidate	Votes	%
Nonpartisan	David LaGrand	50,508	63.36%
Nonpartisan	Senita Lenear	29,211	36.64%
Total votes		79,719	100.00%
