= Penelope Tsernoglou =

American politician from Michigan

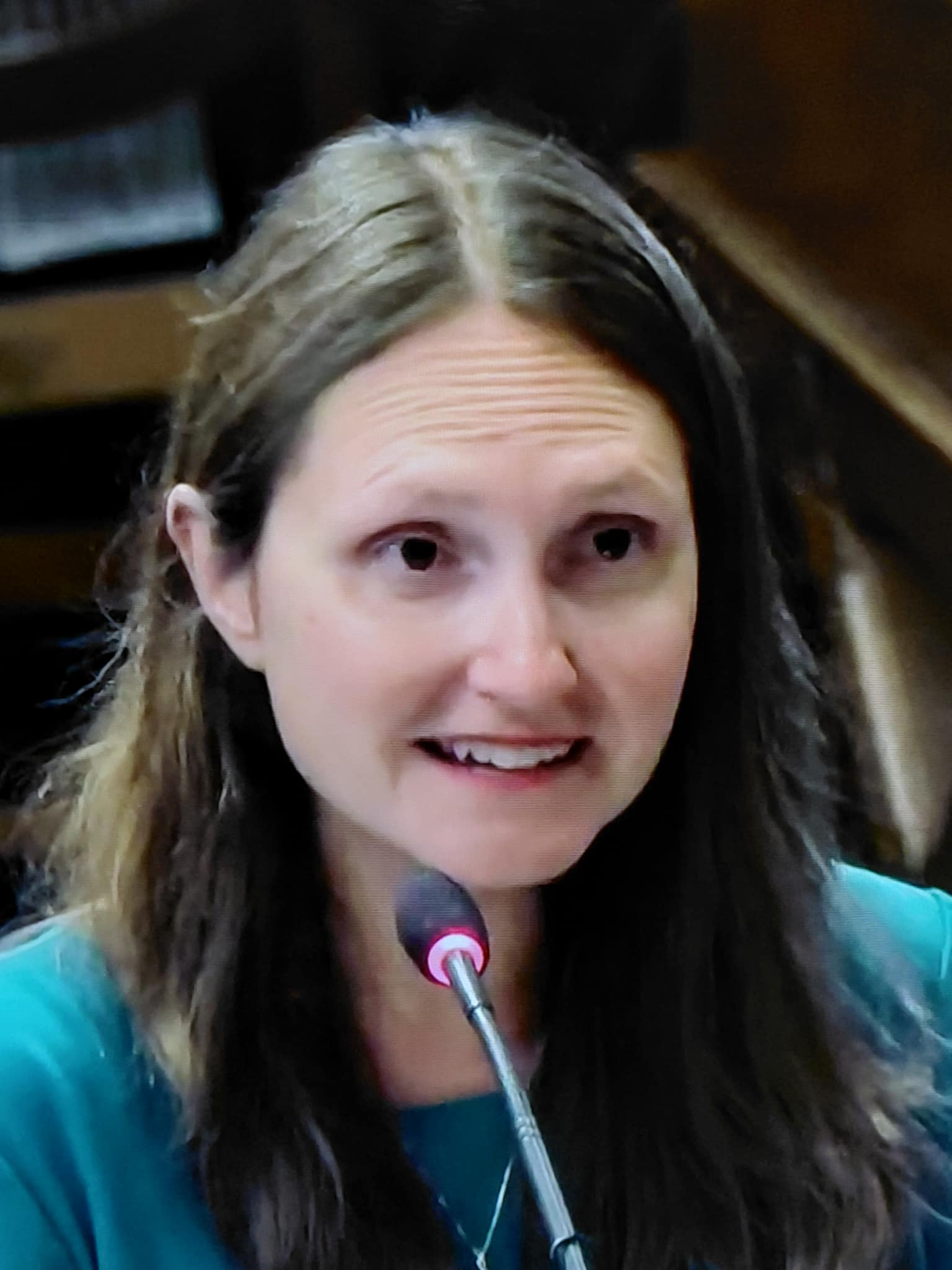
- Tsernoglou at the Michigan State Capitol, 2025

Member of the Michigan House of Representatives from the 75th district
- Incumbent
- Assumed office January 1, 2023
- Preceded by: David LaGrand

Personal details
- Born: Detroit, Michigan U.S.
- Party: Democratic
- Education: University of Michigan (BA); Michigan State University (JD)

Penelope Tsernoglou is an American Democratic politician from Michigan. She was elected to the Michigan House of Representatives from the 75th district in the 2022 election. She was reelected in 2024.
