= 2015 Grand Rapids mayoral election =

Local election in Grand Rapids, Michigan

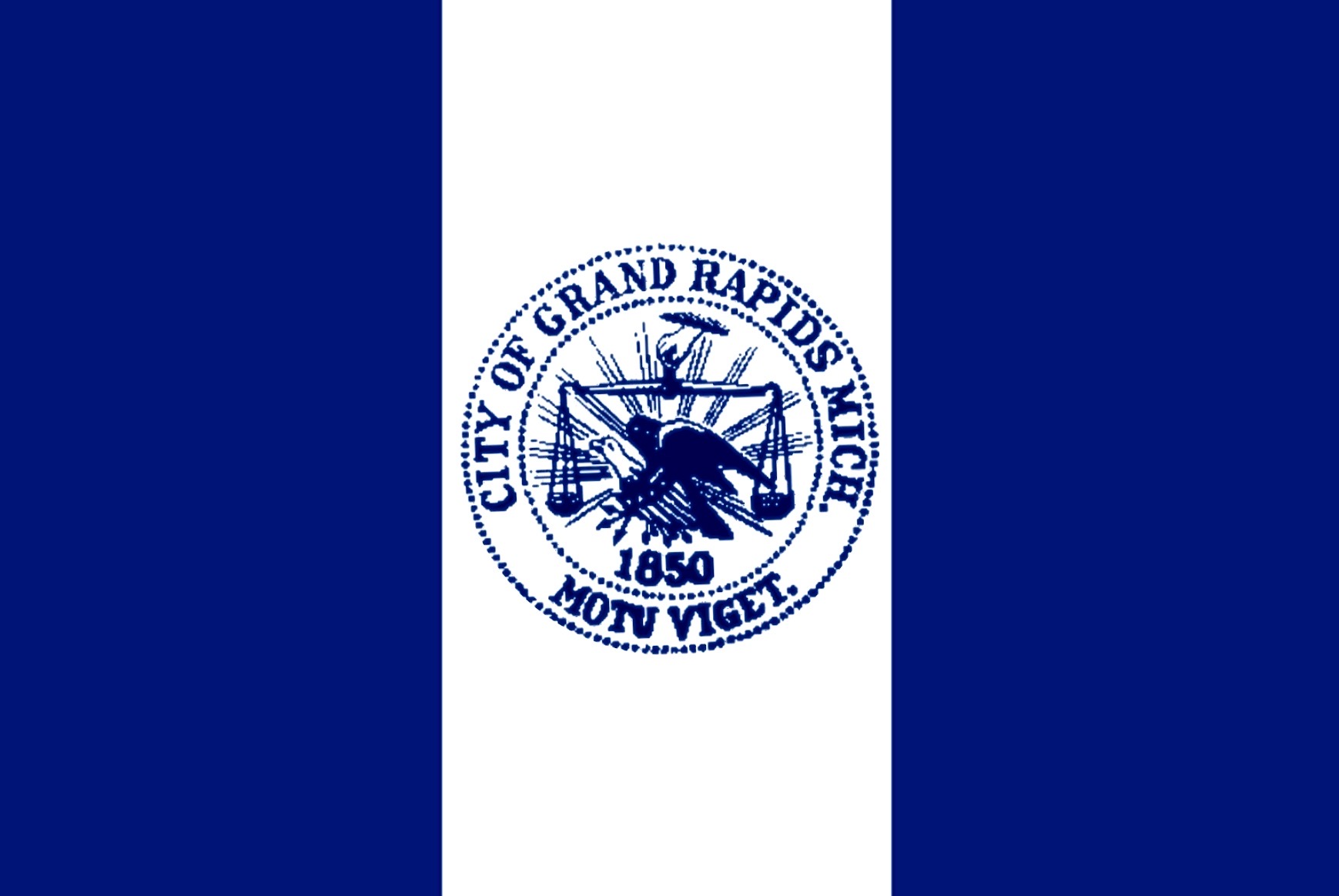
| ← 2011 | August 4, 2015 | 2019 → |
- Turnout: 15.66%

| Candidate | Rosalynn Bliss | Robert Dean |
| Party | Nonpartisan | Nonpartisan |
| Popular vote | 13,248 | 5,971 |
| Percentage | 66.19% | 29.83% |
- Precinct results Bliss: 40–50% 50–60% 60–70% 70–80% 80–90% Dean: 40–50% 50–60% 60–70% 70–80% 80–90% No votes
Mayor before election
George Heartwell
Elected mayor
Rosalynn Bliss

The 2015 Grand Rapids mayoral election took place on August 4, 2015. Following a 2014 change to the city charter, which adopted a two-term limit for mayors, incumbent Mayor George Heartwell was unable to seek a fourth term. City Commissioner Rosalynn Bliss defeated former State Representative Robert Dean in the primary election, winning 66 percent of the vote, eliminating the need for a runoff election, and became the first female Mayor of Grand Rapids.

== Candidates ==
- Rosalynn Bliss, City Commissioner
- Robert Dean, former State Representative
- John George, retired engineer
- Willard Lee, military veteran

== Primary election results ==
2015 Grand Rapids mayoral election
| Party | Candidate | Votes | % |
|---|---|---|---|
| Nonpartisan | Rosalynn Bliss | 13,248 | 66.19% |
| Nonpartisan | Robert Dean | 5,971 | 29.83% |
| Nonpartisan | John George | 567 | 2.83% |
| Nonpartisan | Willard Lee | 230 | 1.15% |
| Total votes | | 20,016 | 100.00% |
