= Michigan's 75th House of Representatives district =

American legislative district

Michigan's 75th State House of Representatives district
Representative
Penelope Tsernoglou; D–East Lansing
- Demographics: 79.8% White; 4.3% Black; 5.6% Hispanic; 4.9% Asian; 0.2% Native American; 0.5% Other; 4.7% Multiracial
- Population (2024): 92,007

Michigan's 75th House of Representatives district (also referred to as Michigan's 75th House district) is a legislative district within the Michigan House of Representatives located in parts of Clinton, Ingham and Shiawassee counties. The district was created in 1965, when the Michigan House of Representatives district naming scheme changed from a county-based system to a numerical one.

== List of representatives ==
Representative	Party	Dates	Residence	Notes
Victor R. Steeh	Democratic	1965–1966	Mount Clemens	
James S. Nunneley	Republican	1967	Mount Clemens	Died in office.
David M. Serotkin	Republican	1967–1972	Mount Clemens	
David Bonior	Democratic	1973–1976	Mount Clemens	
David H. Evans	Democratic	1977–1982	Mount Clemens	Lived in Warren until around 1979.
Kenneth J. DeBeaussaert	Democratic	1983–1984	Washington	
George C. Furton	Republican	1985–1986	Mount Clemens	
Kenneth J. DeBeaussaert	Democratic	1987–1992	Chesterfield Township	
Richard Bandstra	Republican	1993–1994	Grand Rapids	
William R. Byl	Republican	1995–2000	Grand Rapids	
Jerry O. Kooiman	Republican	2001–2006	Grand Rapids	
Robert Dean	Democratic	2007–2010	Grand Rapids	
Brandon Dillon	Democratic	2011–2015	Grand Rapids	Resigned.
David LaGrand	Democratic	2016–2022	Grand Rapids	
Penelope Tsernoglou	Democratic	2023–present	East Lansing	

== Recent elections ==
=== 2020s ===
2026 Michigan House of Representatives election
Party	Candidate	Votes	%
Democratic	Penelope Tsernoglou (incumbent)	30,608	64.56
Republican	Frank Lambert	16,804	35.44
Total votes		47,412	100
Democratic hold			

2018 Michigan House of Representatives election
Party	Candidate	Votes	%
Democratic	David LaGrand	23,709	77.73
Republican	Daniel Allen Schutte	5,841	19.15
Green	Jacob Straley	952	3.12
Total votes		30,502	100
Democratic hold			

2016 Michigan House of Representatives election
Party	Candidate	Votes	%
Democratic	David LaGrand	25,868	76.39%
Republican	Chad Rossiter	7,996	23.61%
Total votes		33,864	100.00%
Democratic hold			

2016 Special Election
Party	Candidate	Votes	%
Democratic	David LaGrand	13,601	77.4
Republican	Blake Edmonds	3,964	22.6
Total votes		17,565	
Democratic hold			

2014 Michigan House of Representatives election
Party	Candidate	Votes	%
Democratic	Brandon Dillon	12,393	73.77
Republican	John Lohrstorfer	4,406	26.23
Total votes		16,799	100.0
Democratic hold			

2012 Michigan House of Representatives election
Party	Candidate	Votes	%
Democratic	Brandon Dillon	23,593	75.78
Republican	William Nathan Sneller	7,540	24.22
Total votes		31,133	100.0
Democratic hold			

2010 Michigan House of Representatives election
Party	Candidate	Votes	%
Democratic	Brandon Dillon	13,678	51.25
Republican	Bing Goei	13,012	48.75
Total votes		26,690	100.0
Democratic hold			

2008 Michigan House of Representatives election
Party	Candidate	Votes	%
Democratic	Robert Dean	24,676	58.08
Republican	Dan Tietema	16,930	39.85
Libertarian	Mark Simonait	880	2.07
Total votes		42,486	100.0
Democratic hold			

== Historical district boundaries ==
Map	Description	Apportionment Plan	Notes
	Macomb County (part): Chesterfield Township; Harrison Township; Lenox Township; Memphis (part); Mount Clemens; New Baltimore (part); Richmond Township; St. Clair County (part): Casco Township; Clay Township; Columbus Township; Cottrellville Township; Ira Township; Marine City; Memphis (part); New Baltimore (part)	1964 Apportionment Plan	
	Macomb County (part): Clinton Township (part); Harrison Township (part); Mount Clemens; Sterling Heights (part)	1972 Apportionment Plan	
	Macomb County (part): Armada Township; Bruce Township; Chesterfield Township; Harrison Township; Lenox Township; Memphis; Mount Clemens; New Baltimore; Ray Township; Richmond; Richmond Township	1982 Apportionment Plan	
	Kent County (part): Grand Rapids (part)	1992 Apportionment Plan	
	Kent County (part): Grand Rapids (part)	2001 Apportionment Plan	
	Kent County (part): Grand Rapids (part)	2011 Apportionment Plan	
