= Lavora Barnes =

American political executive

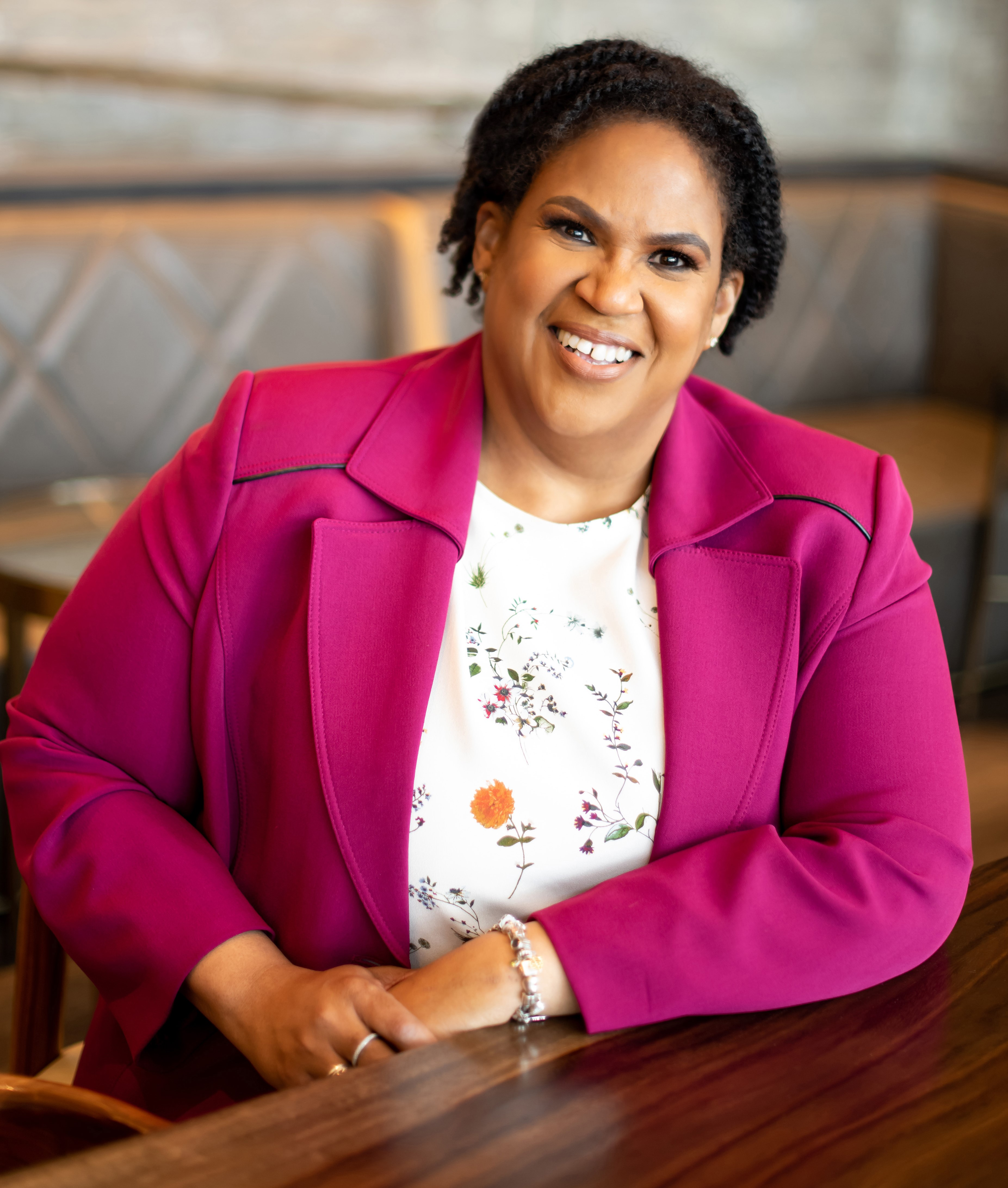

Chair of the Michigan Democratic Party
- In office February 3, 2019 – February 22, 2025
- Preceded by: Brandon Dillon
- Succeeded by: Curtis Hertel Jr.

Personal details
- Born: 1964 or 1965 (age 60–61) North Carolina, U.S.
- Party: Democratic
- Education: College of William and Mary (BA)

Lavora Barnes (born 1964/1965) is an American political executive who served as the chair of the Michigan Democratic Party from 2019 to 2025. She is the first African-American woman elected to be the position and the second woman.

== Early life and education ==
Barnes was born in North Carolina and grew up in Virginia. She graduated from the College of William & Mary in 1987.

== Career ==
Before moving to Michigan, she was the Virginia press secretary for the Bill Clinton 1992 presidential campaign and later worked in his administration.

In 2004, Barnes became a staffer in the Michigan House of Representatives. She worked the Communications director for the Michigan House Democratic Caucus three years later. She also worked as Oakland County's deputy clerk and the state director for the Barack Obama 2012 presidential campaign. In 2015, she became the Michigan Democratic Party's chief operating officer before party chair four years later. In her campaign for the state chair in 2019, she received endorsements from Brandon Dillon, Gretchen Whitmer, and state Attorney General, Dana Nessel.

Party political offices
Preceded by Brandon Dillon	Chair of the Michigan Democratic Party; 2019–2025	Succeeded by Curtis Hertel Jr.
