= 2002 Michigan Secretary of State election =

American state election

- November 5, 2002
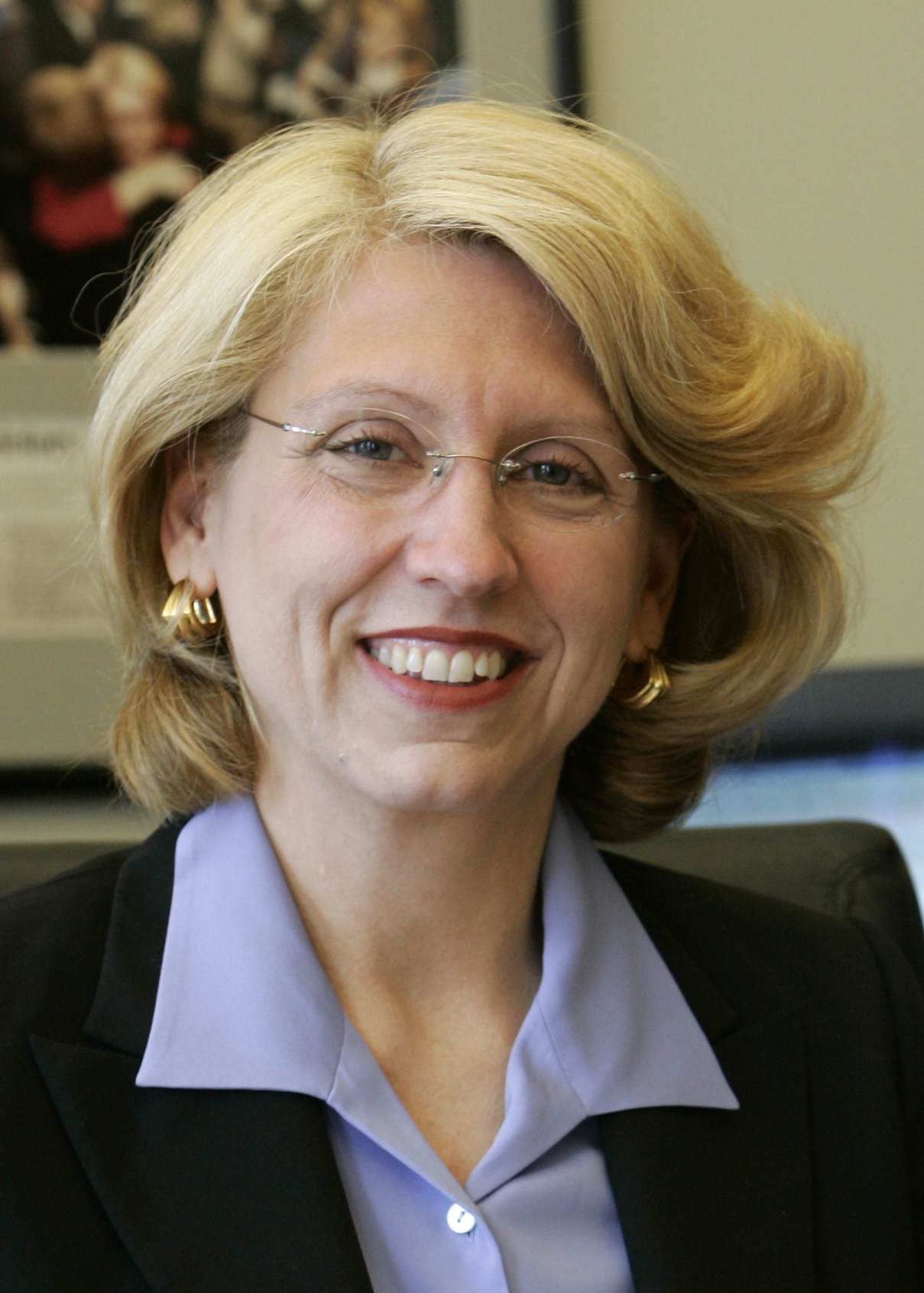

Nominee	Terri Lynn Land	Melvin "Butch" Hollowell
Party	Republican	Democratic
Popular vote	1,703,261	1,331,441
Percentage	54.96%	42.96%
- County results Land: 40-50% 50-60% 60-70% 70-80% Hollowell: 40–50% 50–60% 60–70%
Secretary of State before election
Candice Miller
Republican
Elected Secretary of State
Terri Lynn Land
Republican

The 2002 Michigan Secretary of State election was held on Tuesday, November 5, 2002 to elect the Michigan Secretary of State for a four-year term. Incumbent Republican Candice Miller was term-limited and unable to seek a third term, and instead ran successfully for the United States House of Representatives.

Democratic nominee Melvin Hollowell was defeated by Republican nominee Terri Lynn Land, with Land winning by the largest margin seen in any of the statewide races in that general election.

== Candidates ==
=== Republican Party ===
Former Kent County Clerk Terri Lynn Land won the party's nomination during the state convention.

=== Democratic Party ===
On February 19, 2002, lawyer Melvin "Butch" Hollowell announced his candidacy for the Democratic nomination for Michigan Secretary of State. Another Democrat seeking nomination was John Austin, a member of the state board of education. Hollowell's candidacy was supported by Jennifer Granholm, who was a long time friend and ally of Hollowell's, as well as the party's gubernatorial nominee. The Democratic state convention was held in Lansing in August. Austin would drop out of the running. Hollowell was nominated by the delegates at the convention on August 25.

== Results ==
Michigan Secretary of State election, 2002
Party	Candidate	Votes	%
Republican	Terri Lynn Land	1,703,261	54.96
Democratic	Melvin "Butch" Hollowell	1,331,441	42.96
Green	Ray Ziarno	38,251	1.23
U.S. Taxpayers	Charles Conces	26,253	0.85
Write-in	Richard Clement	2	0
Total votes		3,099,208	100
Republican hold			
