= Brandon Dillon (politician) =

American politician (born 1972)

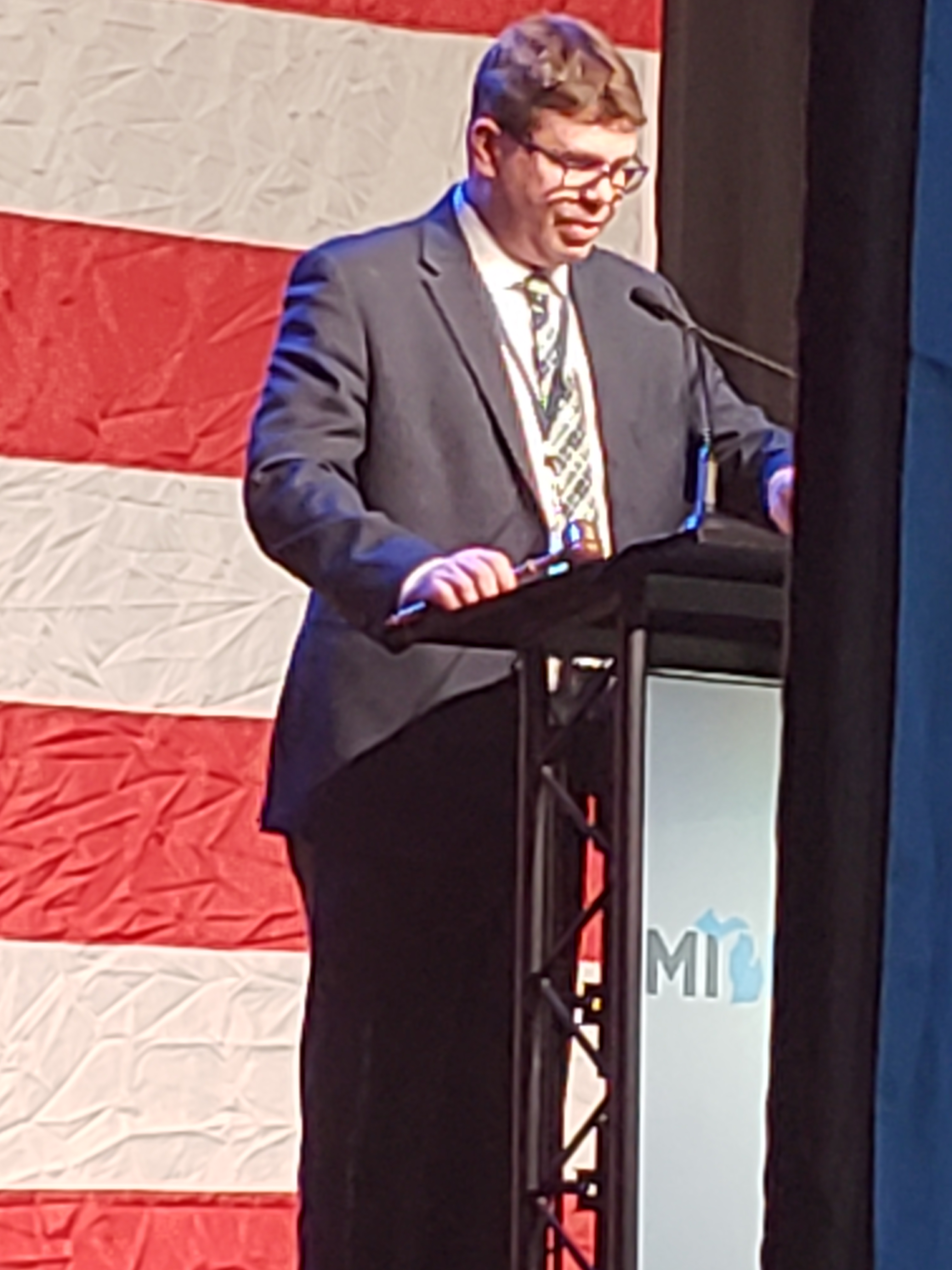
- Brandon Dillon

Chair of the Michigan Democratic Party
- In office July 11, 2015 – February 2, 2019
- Preceded by: Lon Johnson
- Succeeded by: Lavora Barnes

Member of the Michigan House of Representatives from the 75th district
- In office January 1, 2011 – August 3, 2015
- Preceded by: Robert Dean
- Succeeded by: David LaGrand

Personal details
- Born: April 27, 1972 (age 54) Grand Rapids, Michigan, U.S.
- Party: Democratic
- Education: Grand Rapids Community College; Aquinas College, Michigan (BA); Northeastern University (MA)
- Website: Official website

Brandon Dillon (born April 27, 1972) is an American politician. He is the former Chair of the Michigan Democratic Party.

== Early life and education ==
Dillon is a graduate of Catholic Central High School (1990), Grand Rapids Community College (1993), Aquinas College, (1996), and Northeastern University.

== Career ==
Dillon was elected Chair of the Michigan Democratic Party in July 2015 after partnering with former Oakland County, Michigan Deputy Clerk Lavora Barnes to run as a team. In 2010, he was a Kent County Commissioner. From 2011 to 2015, Dillon was a Democratic member of the Michigan House of Representatives. As a legislator, Dillon strongly opposed Michigan's Right-to-work law.

Party political offices
Preceded by Lon Johnson	Chair of the Michigan Democratic Party; 2015–2019	Succeeded by Lavora Barnes
