= James S. Nunneley =

American politician

Member of the Michigan House of Representatives from the 75th district
- In office January 1, 1967 – April 20, 1967
- Preceded by: Victor R. Steeh
- Succeeded by: David M. Serotkin

Personal details
- Born: July 31, 1910 Mount Clemens, Michigan
- Died: April 20, 1967 (aged 56) Lansing, Michigan
- Party: Republican
- Education: Michigan State University

Military service
- Allegiance: United States Navy
- Rank: Lieutenant
- Battles/wars: World War II

James S. Nunneley (July 31, 1910 – April 20, 1967) was a Michigan politician.

== Early life and education ==
Nunneley was born on July 31, 1910, in Mount Clemens, Michigan. Nunneley received an education from Mount Clemens public schools, and in 1933 graduated from Michigan State University.

== Military career ==
Nunneley served as a lieutenant in the United States Navy in World War II.

== Career ==
Nunneley continued to manage his family's business in Mount Clemens when he returned from military service. Nunneley owned a shoe store. Nunneley served on the Mount Clemens Board of Education. On September 1, 1964, Nunneley won the Republican nomination for the Michigan House of Representatives seat representing the 75th district, but was defeated in the general election by Victor R. Steeh on November 3, 1964. On November 8, 1966, Nunneley was elected to the Michigan House of Representatives where he represented the 75th district, beginning his term on January 1, 1967. Nunneley's victory was considered an upset. On April 20, 1967, Nunneley passed his first bill through the state house. It sought to require identification for ice fishing shanties. According to State Representative Charles H. Varnum, Nunneley did not need to speak about his bill to the state house for it to pass, and Nunneley was given "a lot of kidding" because of this. The same day the bill passed, Nunneley died of an apparent heart attack in his Capitol office. The following state representatives acted as honorary pallbearers for Nunneley: Robert C. Stites, Allen F. Rush, Edgar A. Geerlings, William L. Jowett, Warren N. Goemaere, Harold B. Clark, John T. Kelsey, and Joseph M. Snyder. Nunneley's death left the state house in partisan deadlock, with 54 Republican legislators and 54 Democratic legislators.

== Personal life ==
Nunneley, at the time of his death, was a widower who lived with his father. Nunneley had three children. Nunneley was a member of AMVETS, the Elks, and the Sigma Alpha Epsilon fraternity. Nunneley was Presbyterian.

== Electoral history ==
Michigan House of Representatives 75th District Republican Primary Election, 1964
Party	Candidate	Votes	%
Republican	James S. Nunneley	3,163	79.87
Republican	F. Clinton Rogge	797	20.13
Total votes		3,960	100.00

Michigan House of Representatives 75th District General Election, 1964
Party	Candidate	Votes	%
Democratic	Victor R. Steeh	12,693	53.45
Republican	James S. Nunneley	11,056	46.55
Total votes		23,749	100.00

Michigan House of Representatives 75th District Republican Primary Election, 1966
Party	Candidate	Votes	%
Republican	James S. Nunneley	2,097	70.75
Republican	David M. Serotkin	610	20.58
Republican	Earl L. Kansler	257	8.67
Total votes		2,964	100.00

Michigan House of Representatives 75th District General Election, 1966
Party	Candidate	Votes	%
Republican	James S. Nunneley	10,179	55.54
Democratic	Victor R. Steeh	8,148	44.46
Total votes		18,327	100.00
