= Melvin Hollowell =

American lawyer

Melvin "Butch" Hollowell

Co-Chair of the Michigan Democratic Party
- In office 2003–2004 Serving with Mark Brewer
- Preceded by: Mark Brewer (as chair)
- Succeeded by: Mark Brewer (as chair)

Personal details
- Born: 1959 or 1960 (age 65–66) Honolulu, Hawaii, U.S.
- Party: Democratic
- Spouse: Desiree Cooper
- Education: Albion College (BA); University of Virginia; School of Law (JD)

Melvin "Butch" Hollowell Jr. (born 1959 or 1960) is an American lawyer and politician. In 2002, Hollowell was Democratic nominee for Michigan Secretary of State, but was defeated by Terri Lynn Land. He served as co-chairman of the Michigan Democratic Party, alongside Mark Brewer, from 2003 to his resignation in 2004. Hollowell was the first African American chairman of the Michigan Democratic Party.

== Biography ==
Melvin Hollowell was born in either 1959 or 1960 in an army hospital in Honolulu, Hawaii. His father was a surgeon stationed in the city. Hollowell graduated from University of Detroit Jesuit High School and Academy in the 1970s. He served as an intern under U. S. Senator Carl Levin in the late 1970s. He graduated from Albion College in 1981 with a bachelor's degree in English. In 1984, he got his Juris Doctor degree from the University of Virginia. Around 1984, Hollowell married fellow activist and lawyer Desiree Cooper. The couple met while attending the University of Virginia. They had two children together.

From 1984 to 1985, Hollowell worked with the law firm Dickinson Wright. He served as assistant prosecutor of Wayne County from 1985 to 1986. He served as a board member for the Detroit branch of the NAACP from 1986 to 1993. He served as Wayne County purchasing director from 1986 to 1987. He served as assistant county executive under Edward H. McNamara from 1988 to 1990. In 1990, Hollowell served as political director for Senator Levin's re-election campaign. From 1990 to 1995, he worked for private law practices. In 1993, he sought presidential appointment as U.S. attorney for the Eastern District of Michigan. In 1994, he unsuccessfully contested incumbent John Conyers in the Democratic primary for a seat in the U.S. House of Representatives representing the state's 14th congressional district. He began working for Butzel Long in 1995, where he'd serve as a partner. Hollowell served as co-chair of the 2000 Al Gore presidential campaign in Michigan.

On February 19, 2002, Hollowell announced his candidacy for the Democratic nomination for Michigan Secretary of State. Another Democrat seeking nomination was John Austin, a member of the state board of education. Hollowell's candidacy was supported by Jennifer Granholm, who was a long time friend and ally of Hollowell's, as well as the party's gubernatorial nominee. Hollowell was nominated at the state convention in August. Hollowell was defeated by Republican nominee Terri Lynn Land in the November general election, with Land winning by the largest margin seen in any of the statewide elections that day.

By January 2003, it was reported Hollowell sought to contest the chairmanship of the Michigan Democratic Party, challenging incumbent Mark Brewer, who'd held the position since 1995. While Hollowell's bid for chairman was backed by Governor Granholm, Brewer's chairmanship was backed by organized labor. On February 11, Hollowell announced a power sharing compromise plan. As per the plan, Hollowell would serve as a chairman of the party. His duties would focus on communications related aspects of the position, such as chairing party conventions and running campaigns. Brewer was to serve as executive chairman, focusing on finance and budgeting concerns. At the February 15 state convention, Brewer and Hollowell were both elected co-chairmen of the party. Hollowell was the first African American chairman of the Michigan Democratic Party. Kathleen Gray of the Detroit Free Press described the power sharing arrangement as "awkward", with tensions arising between Brewer and Hollowell. On August 3, 2004, Hollowell stepped down as chairman to become a legal advisor on John Kerry's presidential campaign.

On August 17, 2004, Hollowell received a citation after being pulled over by Wayne County sheriff's deputies. He was accused of soliciting a prostitute. Hollowell denied the charges, claiming he was only trying to help a woman when he thought she was in distress. The woman involved, Michelle C. Sherman, told the police that Hollowell paid her for oral sex. In response to the citation, Hollowell resigned from the Kerry campaign, from his recent gubernatorial appointment to the Michigan Civil Rights Commission, and from his partnership at Butzel Long. After he appealed the case from district court to circuit court, the charges against Hollowell were dropped in January 2005, on the grounds that the deputies had no authority to pull over Hollowell.

In February 2005, it was announced that Hollowell was hired by the firm Allen Brothers, Attorneys & Counselors. Effective April 6, 2008, Hollowell was appointed by Governor Granholm as Automobile and Home Insurance Consumer Advocate, a newly established position.

Hollowell worked as a lawyer on the 2013 Detroit mayoral campaign of Mike Duggan. After Duggan was elected, in December 2013, he named Hollowell as Detroit corporation counsel, the city's top lawyer position. Hollowell announced his resignation as corporation counsel in November 2017. He resigned to accept a position as managing partner at The Miller Law Firm in January 2018.

After Mary Sheffield's victory in the 2025 Detroit mayoral election, she named Hollowell to lead her transition team.

Party political offices
Preceded by Mary Lou Parks	Democratic nominee for Michigan Secretary of State; 2002	Succeeded by Carmella Sabaugh
