= Victor R. Steeh =

American politician

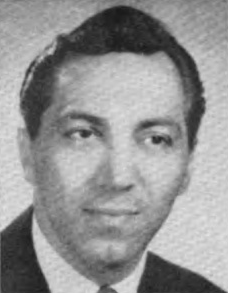

Member of the Michigan House of Representatives from the 75th district
- In office January 13, 1965 – December 31, 1966
- Preceded by: District established
- Succeeded by: James S. Nunneley

Personal details
- Born: May 8, 1923 Michigan
- Died: August 8, 2007 (aged 84) Michigan
- Party: Democratic
- Education: Wayne State University

Military service
- Allegiance: United States
- Branch/service: United States Army
- Battles/wars: World War II

Victor R. Steeh (May 8, 1923 – August 8, 2007) was an American politician. He served in the Michigan House of Representatives.

== Early life and education ==
Victor attended Castle Heights Military Academy, Eastern Michigan University, and Western Michigan University. Victor earned a B.S. in business administration from Wayne State University.

== Military career ==
Steeh served in the United States Army Air Corps during World War II.

== Career ==
Steeh was an insurance salesman. On November 4, 1964, Steeh was elected to the Michigan House of Representatives where he represented the 75th district from January 13, 1965, to December 31, 1966. On November 8, 1966, Steeh was defeated in his attempt for re-election by James S. Nunneley. Steeh would run for this seat in the state house five more times, in the years 1967, 1970, 1972, 1976, and 1982.

== Personal life ==
Victor lived in Mount Clemens, Michigan. Victor was married to Elsie M. Steeh. Together, they had two children. He was the brother of fellow state legislator, George C. Steeh. Victor was a member of AMVETS and the Disabled American Veterans. Victor was Episcopalian.

== Death ==
Steeh died on August 8, 2007, in Michigan. He was interred in Clinton Grove Cemetery.
