= Lon Johnson =

American politician

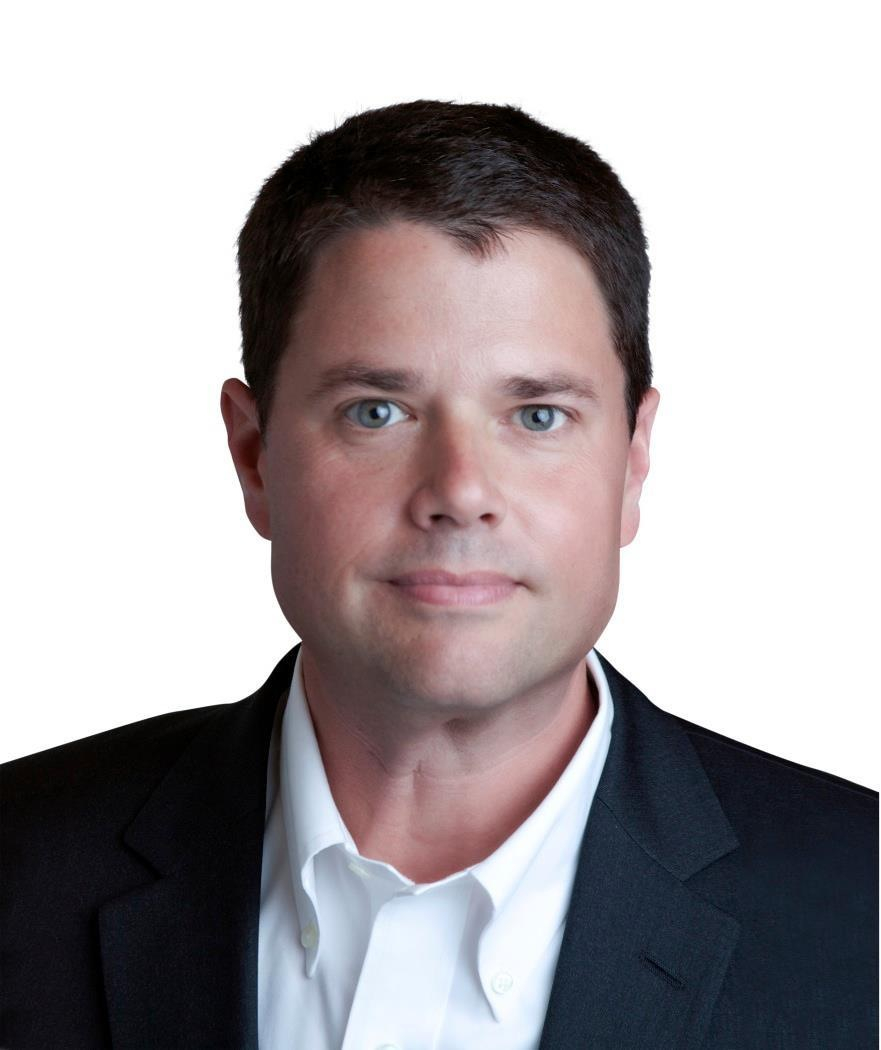

Chair of the Michigan Democratic Party
- In office February 23, 2013 – July 11, 2015
- Preceded by: Mark Brewer
- Succeeded by: Brandon Dillon

Personal details
- Born: Lonnie Barton Johnson; June 18 Rockwood, Michigan, U.S.
- Party: Democratic
- Spouse: Julianna Smoot
- Education: Arizona State University, Tempe (BA)
- Website: Official website

Lonnie Barton Johnson is an American politician. He is the former chairperson of the Michigan Democratic Party, having served in that position from 2013 through 2015. He was an unsuccessful candidate in the 2012 election for the 103rd district in the Michigan House of Representatives. He was the Democratic nominee for Michigan's 1st congressional district in the 2016 election, losing to Republican Jack Bergman in the general election by over 50,000 votes.

== Personal life ==
Johnson was born in Rockwood, Michigan. His father is a retired machinist and his grandfather was a steelworker. He graduated from Arizona State University. He is a son of Vivian L. Pluff of Onsted, Michigan, and Gary S. Johnson of Richland, Pennsylvania. Lon has an identical twin brother, Lance Johnson.

On October 22, 2011, Johnson married Julianna Smoot, a fundraiser for Democrats. She was a Deputy Manager of Barack Obama's 2012 presidential reelection campaign, having previously served as White House Social Secretary, Deputy Assistant to the President, and Chief of Staff to United States Trade Representative Ron Kirk. His wife's employment in the Obama reelection effort was a campaign issue.

== Career ==
Johnson has worked for the Democratic National Committee, the Democratic Senatorial Campaign Committee, and Congressman John Dingell's 2002 campaign. Johnson also worked for a non-profit called the National Democratic Institute. During his time there he traveled to Iraq to help with the installation of a political system based on democratic governance. He was formerly vice president of a private equity firm in Tennessee, TVV Capital, a private fund in Nashville that invests in small and midsize manufacturers and other companies, chiefly in the Southeast.

== Political campaigns ==
=== 2012 Michigan House of Representatives campaign ===
Johnson made an unsuccessful bid in the 2012 elections to unseat incumbent Republican Representative Bruce Rendon in the 103rd district of the Michigan House of Representatives.

During the election, his opponent made the employment of his wife, Julianna Smoot, in the Obama reelection effort a campaign issue.

His endorsements included the Mackinac Sierra Club Chapter, Michigan League of Conservation Voters, Planned Parenthood Advocates of Michigan, and PrideSource.

Johnson's campaign raised a total of $347,637 during the 2012 election cycle.

=== 2013 Michigan Democratic Party Chairperson election ===
On February 5, 2013, Johnson announced his intentions to become Michigan Democratic Party Chairperson. The two-year position was voted on during the Michigan Democratic Party Convention at Cobo Hall in Detroit on February 23, 2013. Johnson's main opponent was Mark Brewer. Brewer was the longest-serving Democratic Party chairperson in the US, having first been elected to the position in 1995.

All seven Democrats in Michigan’s congressional delegation signed a letter sent to party members on February 5, 2013 which announced their collective endorsement of Johnson for the chair of the state party. He also received the support of the United Auto Workers, while his opponent, Mark Brewer, had the support of the Michigan Education Association.

Johnson said he intended to hire an executive director to oversee day-to-day operations of the state headquarters while he focused on campaign and outreach efforts.

On the day of the election, February 23, 2013, Mark Brewer withdrew from the race. Brewer announced his decision to thousands of delegates to withdraw rather than continue a floor election. Johnson was elected chairperson shortly after Brewer's announcement.

=== 2016 U.S. House campaign ===
On June 25, 2015, Johnson announced his intentions to step down as Chair of the Michigan Democratic Party and run for Michigan's 1st congressional district. His tenure as Chair officially ended on July 11, 2015, when a new Chair was selected by the state party's executive committee. Republican incumbent Dan Benishek is retiring.

Johnson won the Democratic primary in August 2016. He faced Republican nominee Jack Bergman in the November 2016 general election. Bergman won 55% of the vote to Johnson's 40%.

== Other political activity ==
In November 2023, ahead of the 2024 United States Senate election in Michigan, Senate candidate and business executive Nasser Beydoun alleged that Johnson had approached him with an offer of $20 million from a pro-Israel lobbying group to drop out of the Senate race and primary United States Representative Rashida Tlaib. Johnson denied the claims.

In October 2026, Johnson called for voters to file a blank vote in the 2026 United States Senate election in Michigan.

== Electoral history ==
Michigan's 103rd state House of Representatives District General Election, 2012
Party	Candidate	Votes	%
Republican	Bruce Rendon (I)	23,308	52.8
Democratic	Lon Johnson	20,832	47.2
Republican hold			

Party political offices
Preceded by Mark Brewer	Chair of the Michigan Democratic Party; 2013–2015	Succeeded by Brandon Dillon
