= George C. Furton =

American politician

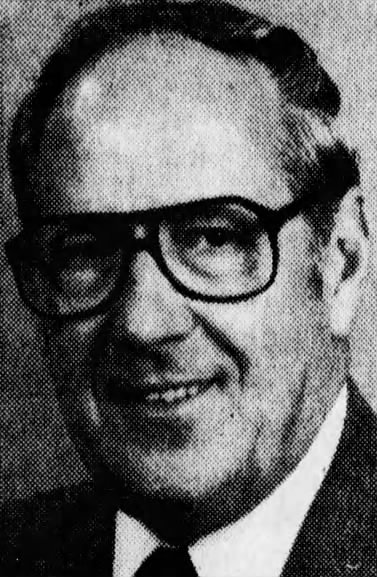
- Furton in 1984

Member of the Michigan House of Representatives from the 75th district
- In office 1985–1986
- Preceded by: Kenneth J. DeBeaussaert
- Succeeded by: Kenneth J. DeBeaussaert

Personal details
- Born: October 24, 1923 New Baltimore, Michigan, U.S.
- Died: March 22, 2006 (aged 82)
- Party: Republican

George C. Furton (October 24, 1923 – March 22, 2006) was an American politician. He served as a Republican member for the 75th district of the Michigan House of Representatives.

== Life and career ==
Furton was born in New Baltimore, Michigan. He was a real estate broker.

Furton served in the Michigan House of Representatives from 1985 to 1986.

Furton died on March 22, 2006, at the age of 82.
