= Mark Brewer (Michigan Democrat) =

American lawyer

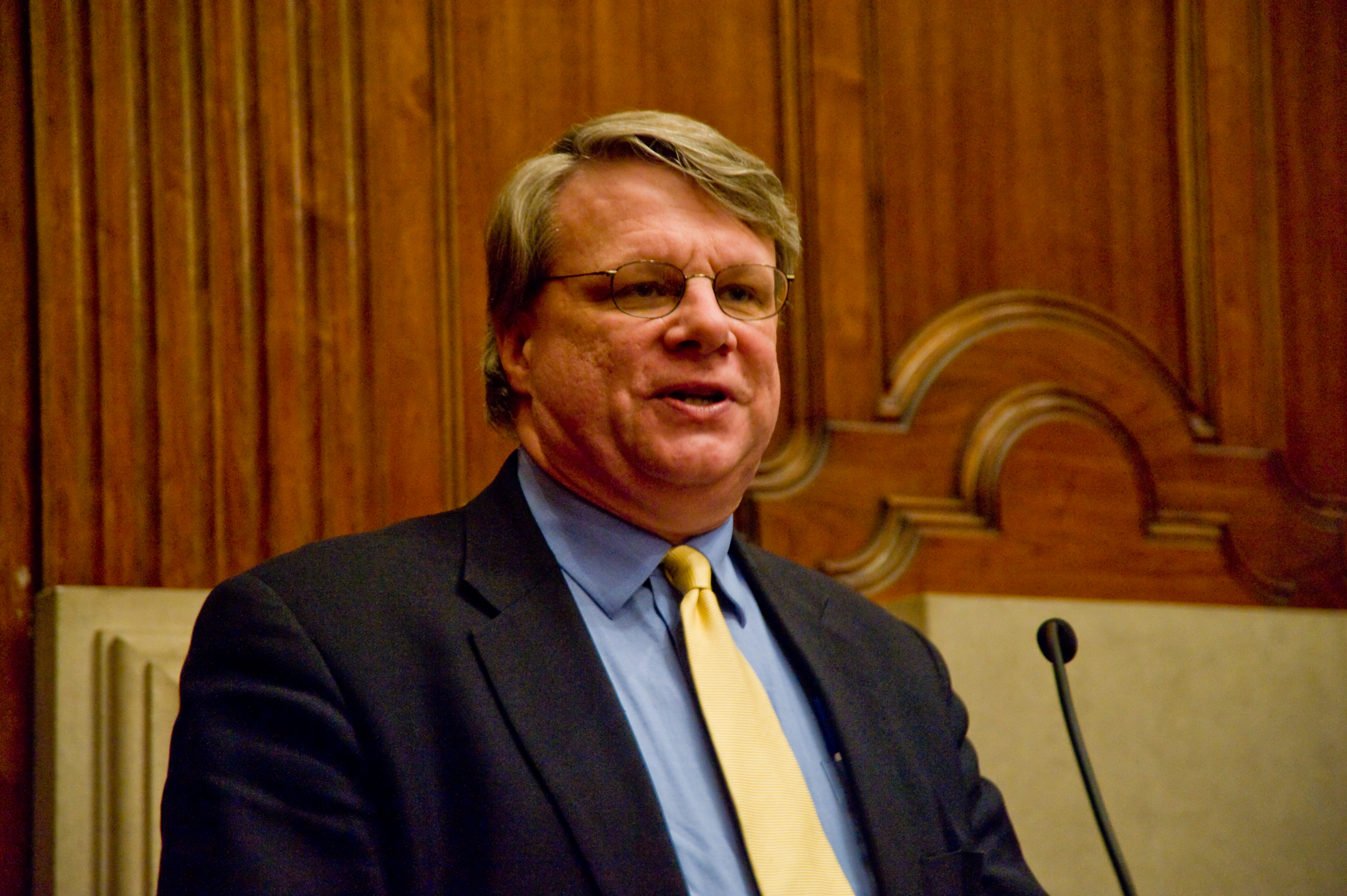
- Brewer in 2009

Chair of the Michigan Democratic Party
- In office 1995–2013 Serving with Melvin Hollowell (2003–2004)
- Preceded by: Gary Corbin
- Succeeded by: Lon Johnson

Personal details
- Born: 1955 or 1956 (age 69–70)
- Party: Democratic
- Education: Harvard College (BA); Stanford Law School

Mark Brewer (born 1955 or 1956) is an American lawyer, political consultant, and a member of the Democratic National Committee. He is the former chair of the Michigan Democratic Party and a past chair of the Association of State Democratic Chairs.

Brewer was the longest serving chair of the Michigan Democratic Party.

== Early life ==
Mark Brewer was born in either 1955 or 1956. He's from Clinton Township in Macomb County. He graduated from Mount Clemens High School in 1973. He graduated with honors from Harvard College in 1977, earning a bachelor's degree in government. In 1981, he got his Juris Doctor degree from Stanford University Law School.

== Career ==
Brewer was first elected chair of the Michigan Democratic Party (MDP) in February 1995, taking over from former party chair Gary Corbin. He was elected unopposed. He was re-elected in 1997. He was again re-elected in 1999, despite a notable challenge from attorney Steve Dart. He was re-elected in 2001.

In 2003, Brewer faced a potential challenge to his chairmanship from Melvin "Butch" Hollowell. While Hollowell's bid for chairman was backed by Governor Granholm, Brewer's chairmanship was backed by organized labor. On February 11, Hollowell announced a power sharing compromise plan. As per the plan, Hollowell would serve as a chairman of the party. His duties would focus on communications related aspects of the position, such as chairing party conventions and running campaigns. Brewer was to serve as executive chairman, focusing on finance and budgeting concerns. At the February 15 state convention, Brewer and Hollowell were both elected co-chairmen of the party. Kathleen Gray of the Detroit Free Press described the power sharing arrangement as "awkward", with tensions arising between Brewer and Hollowell. On August 3, 2004, Hollowell stepped down as chairman to become a legal advisor on John Kerry's presidential campaign. Upon Hollowell's resignation, Brewer was once again the sole MDP chair.

In 2013, Brewer lost his bid for a tenth two-year term as MDP Chair to Lon Johnson, a former political operative and former candidate for the Michigan House of Representatives. Brewer withdrew form the election during the February 23, 2013 Michigan Democratic Party Convention held at Cobo Hall in Detroit, Michigan. In June 2013, Mark joined Goodman Acker, the Detroit area firm, as a lawyer and political consultant.
