= Michigan Democratic Party =

Michigan affiliate of the Democratic Party

- Chairperson: Curtis Hertel Jr.
- Governor of Michigan: Gretchen Whitmer
- Lieutenant Governor of Michigan: Garlin Gilchrist
- Senate Leader: Winnie Brinks
- House Minority Leader: Ranjeev Puri
- Headquarters: Lansing, Michigan
- National affiliation: Democratic Party
- Colors: Blue
- Michigan House of Representatives: 52 / 110
- Michigan Senate: 20 / 38
- Statewide Executive Offices: 4 / 4
- Seats on the Michigan Supreme Court: 6 / 7
- U.S. House of Representatives: 5 / 13
- U.S. Senate: 2 / 2

Website
- Official Website

The Michigan Democratic Party is the affiliate of the Democratic Party in the state of Michigan. It is based in Lansing. Curtis Hertel Jr. is the party's current chair.

== Structure ==
Residents of the state of Michigan at least 16 years of age are eligible for party membership; no financial contribution is required. Generally, a person is required to have been a member for at least 30 days before a convention, caucus or meeting to receive voting privileges.

Between state party conventions, the party is governed by the Democratic State Central Committee (DSCC). Delegates to the state central committee are elected at congressional district spring conventions in odd-numbered years. Each district is entitled to at least four delegates consisting of two men and two women, with additional members allocated by congressional district based on the proportion of its vote for the Democratic nominee for President or Secretary of State at the last general election held. Additional ex-officio with voting privileges include the Democratic National Committee members of the state and the officers of the DSCC. Any congressional district or county chairs having not been elected delegates also become DSCC ex-officio members, but without voting privileges.

== Leadership ==
The DSCC's officers are elected at the spring state convention in odd-numbered years by party members. Officers consists of a Chair, two Vice-Chairs one of each of a different gender and race, Secretary, Corresponding Secretary, Treasurer, and any additional officers as the convention deems proper. Current major officers for the DSCC include:

- Chair: Curtis Hertel Jr.
- 1st Vice-Chair: Portia Roberson
- 2nd Vice-Chair: Nazmul Hassan-Shahin
- 3rd Vice-Chair: Deirdre Honner
- 4th Vice-Chair: Jonathan Kinloch
- 5th Vice-Chair: Jessica Alexander
- 6th Vice-Chair: Justin Mendoza
- Youth Vice-Chair: Adam LaCasse
- Recording Secretary: Candice Mushatt
- Corresponding Secretary: Hind Omar
- Treasurer: Chris Cracchiolo
- Parliamentarian: Nathan Triplett
- Outreach Chair: Sami Khaldi
- Legislative Chair House: Rep. Jason Morgan
- Legislative Chair Senate: Sen. Sylvia Santana

Officers of the DSCC plus the Democratic National Committee members constitute the Executive Committee of the DSCC. The Executive Committee addresses policy questions in between the meetings of the DSCC. The Executive Committee is also responsible for drawing up a two-year budget for the DSCC at a spring meeting in odd-numbered years.

=== List of chairs of the Michigan Democratic Party ===
The following is an incomplete list of chairs of the Michigan Democratic Party.

Name	Term	Ref.
Daniel J. Campau	1890–1894	
Elliot G. Stevenson	1894–1896	
Fred A. Baker	1896–1898	
Daniel J. Campau	1898–1901	
Justin R. Whiting	1901–1903	
Thomas E. Backworth	1903–1904	
Edwin O. Wood	1904–1906	
John T. Winship	1906–1909	
Edmund C. Shields	1909–1916	
Albert E. Stevenson	1916–1919	
Thad Preston	1919–1921	
William Comstock	1921–1924	
Horatio J. Abbott	1924–1929	
Henry H. Heimann	1929–1930	
Alfred Debo	1930–1934	
Walter I. McKenzie	1934	
Elmer B. O'Hara (Note: In May 1935, O'Hara was stripped of his powers as chairman by the state central committee, though he retained the title. His powers were transferred to an executive committee until his resignation in 1936.)	1934–1936	
Edward J. Fry	1936–1939	
Charles S. Porritt	1939–1943	
Earnest C. Brooks	1943–1944	
Walter C. Averill Jr.	1944–1945	
David M. Martin	1945–1947	
John Franco	1947–1949	
Hicks Griffiths	1949–1950	
Neil Staebler	1950–1961	
John Collins	1961–1963	
Zolton Ferency	1963–1968	
Sander Levin	1968–1969	
James McNeely	1969–1973	
Morley Winograd	1973–1979	
Olivia Maynard	1979–1983	
Richard Wiener	1983–1989	
F. Thomas Lewand	1989–1991	
Gary Corbin	1991–1995	
Mark Brewer (Note: From 2003 to 2004, both Brewer and Hollowell served as co-chairs of the party. Brewer was designated as executive chairman, while Hollowell was chairman. This lasted until Hollowell resigned in August 2004.)	1995–2013	
Melvin Hollowell	2003–2004	
Lon Johnson	2013–2015	
Brandon Dillon	2015–2019	
Lavora Barnes	2019–2025	
Curtis Hertel Jr.	2025–present	

== Current officeholders ==
The Michigan Democratic Party controls all four statewide offices and a majority in the Michigan Senate. Democrats hold both of Michigan's U.S. Senate seats, five (Note: Haley Stevens was removed from the party after endorsing Republican nominee Mike Rogers in the 2026 United States Senate election in Michigan over Democratic nominee Abdul El-Sayed.) of the state's 13 U.S. House seats, and majorities on the elected governing boards of the University of Michigan, Michigan State University, and Wayne State University as well as a majority on the State Board of Education.

=== Members of Congress ===
==== U.S. Senate ====
Democrats have controlled both of Michigan's seats in the U.S. Senate since 2000:

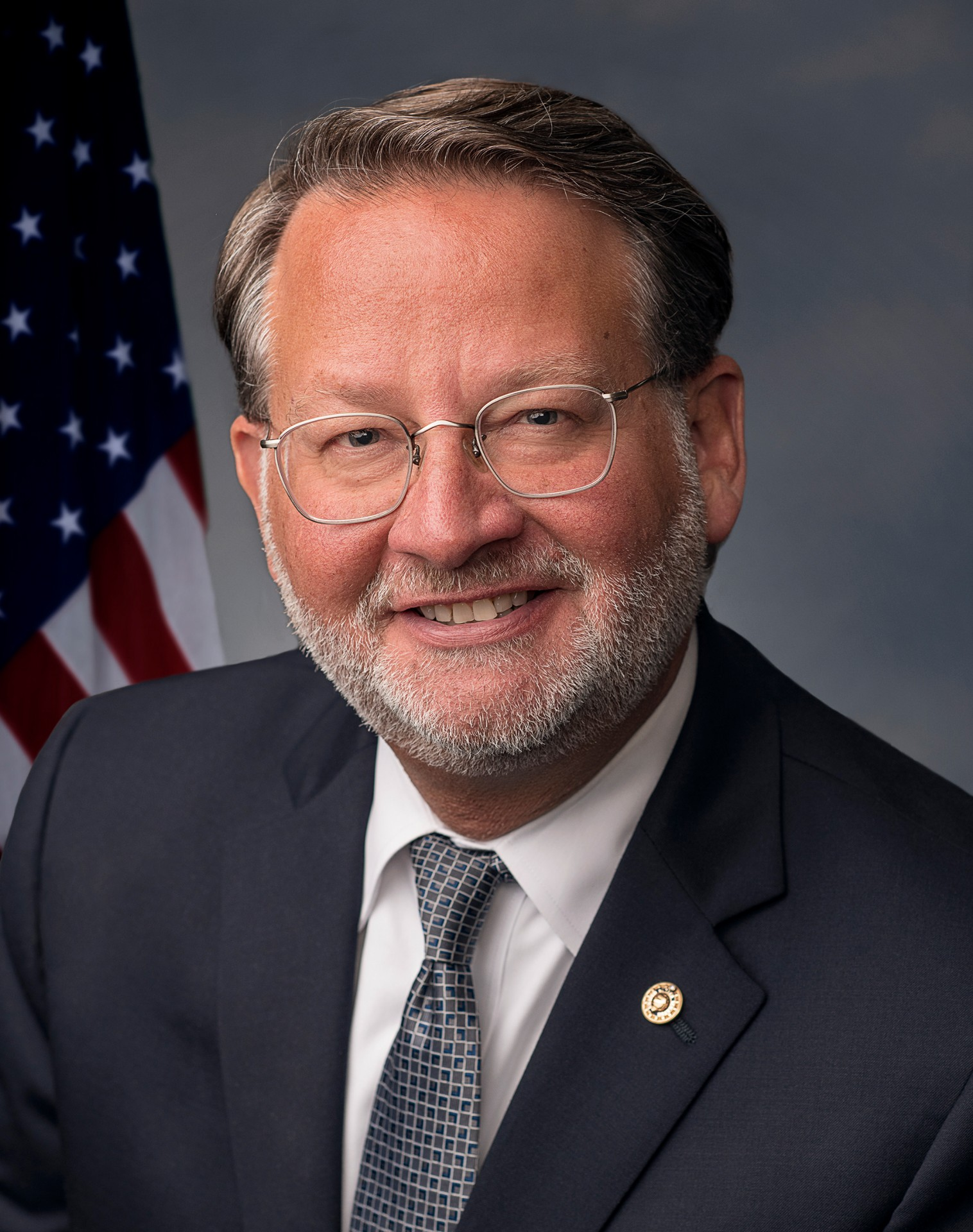
Senior U.S. Senator Gary Peters

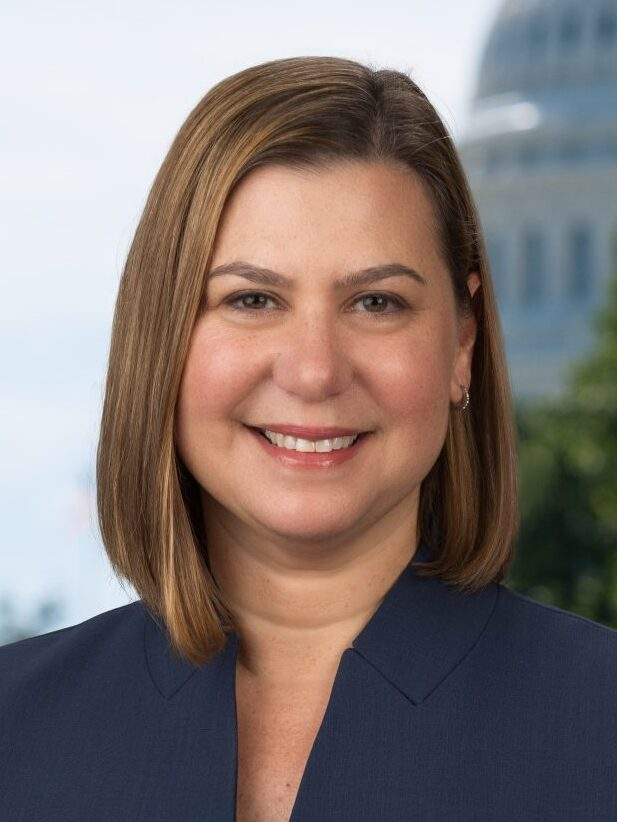
Junior (pre-Senior) U.S. Senator Elissa Slotkin

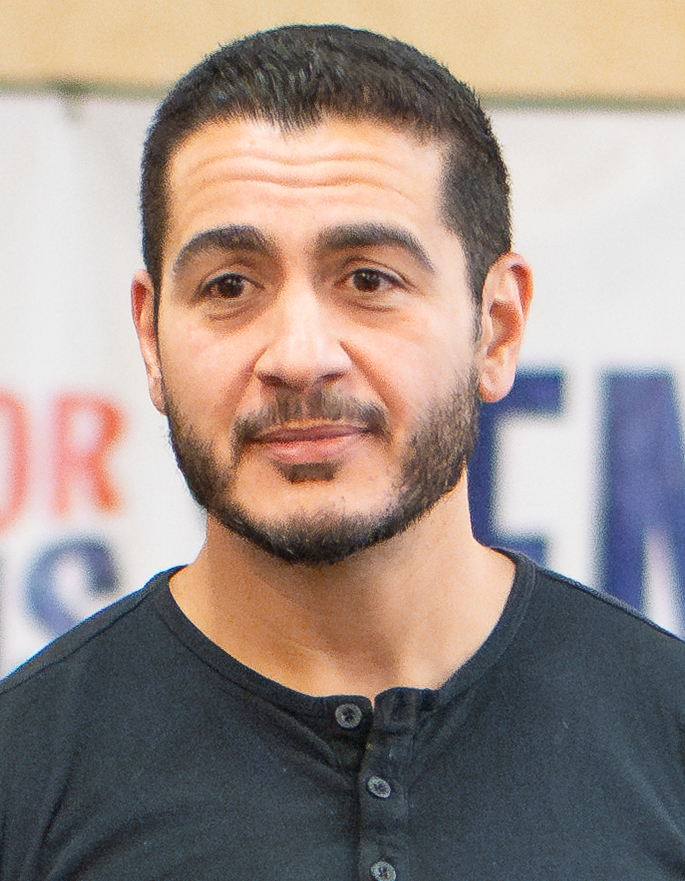
Pre-junior U.S. Senator-elect Abdul El-Sayed

==== U.S. House of Representatives ====
Out of the 13 seats Michigan is apportioned in the U.S. House of Representatives, five are held by members of the Michigan Democratic Party.

Haley Stevens, a Democrat serving Michigan's 11th Congressional District, was removed from the Michigan Democratic Party after she endorsed Mike Rogers in Michigan's 2026 US Senate election on November 1st, 2026.

District	Member	Photo
3rd	Hillary Scholten	
4th	Sean McCann (elect)	
6th	Debbie Dingell	
7th	William Lawrence (elect)	
8th	Kristen McDonald Rivet	
10th	Christina Hines (elect)	
11th	Jeremy Moss (elect)	
12th	Rashida Tlaib	
13th	Shri Thanedar	
13th	Donovan McKinney (elect)	

=== Statewide offices ===
Democrats control all four of the elected statewide offices:

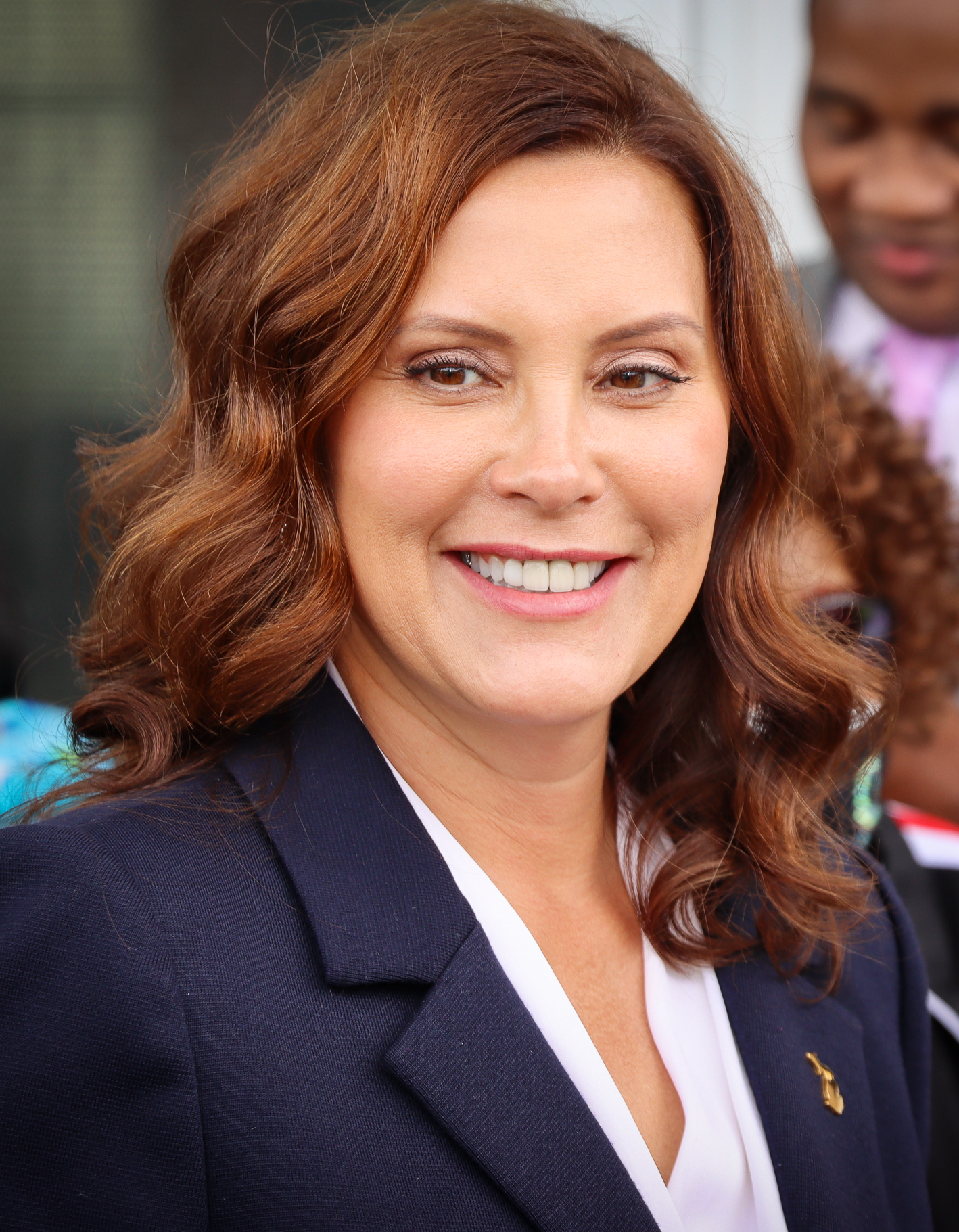
Governor Gretchen Whitmer

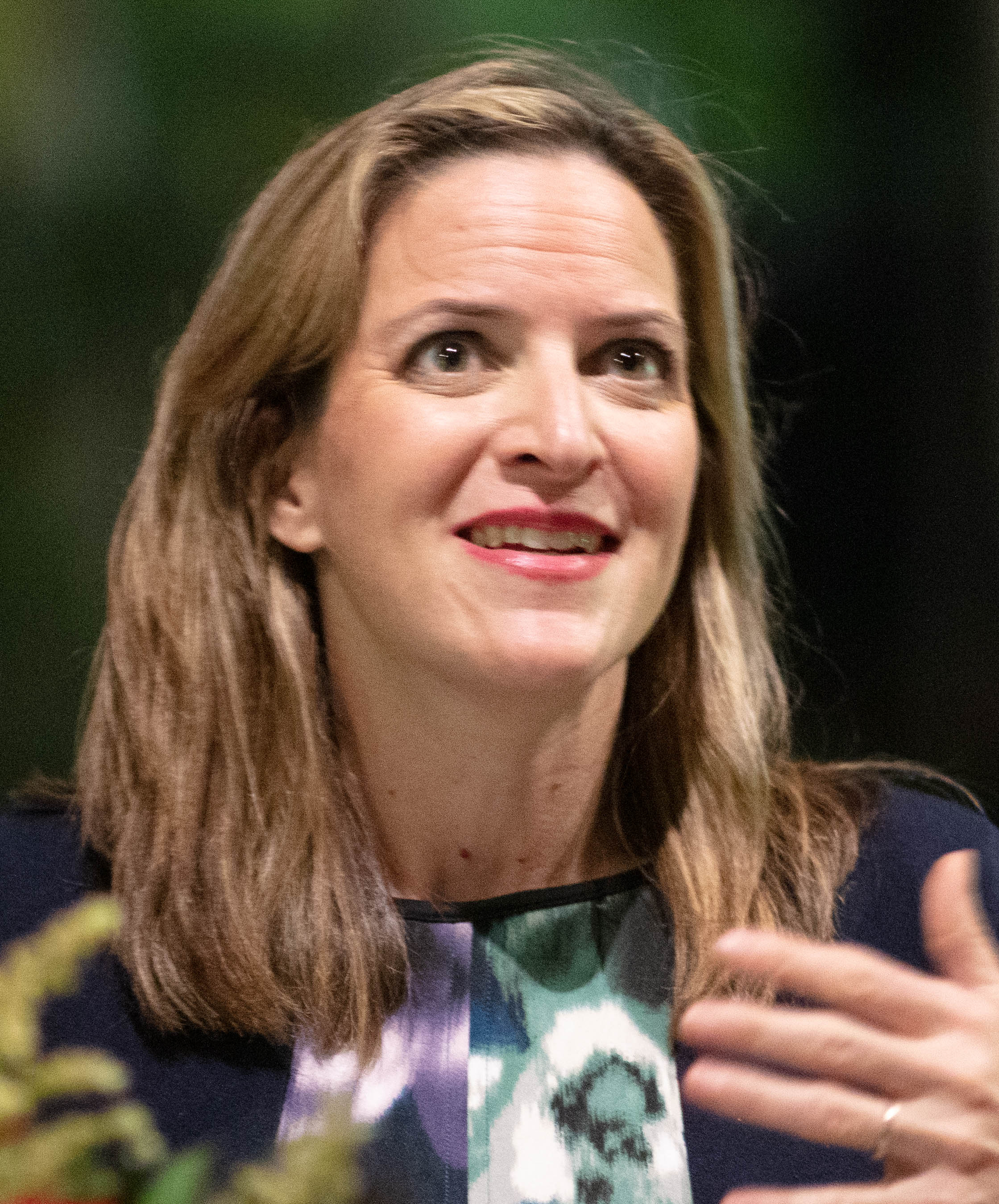
Secretary of State → Governor-elect Jocelyn Benson

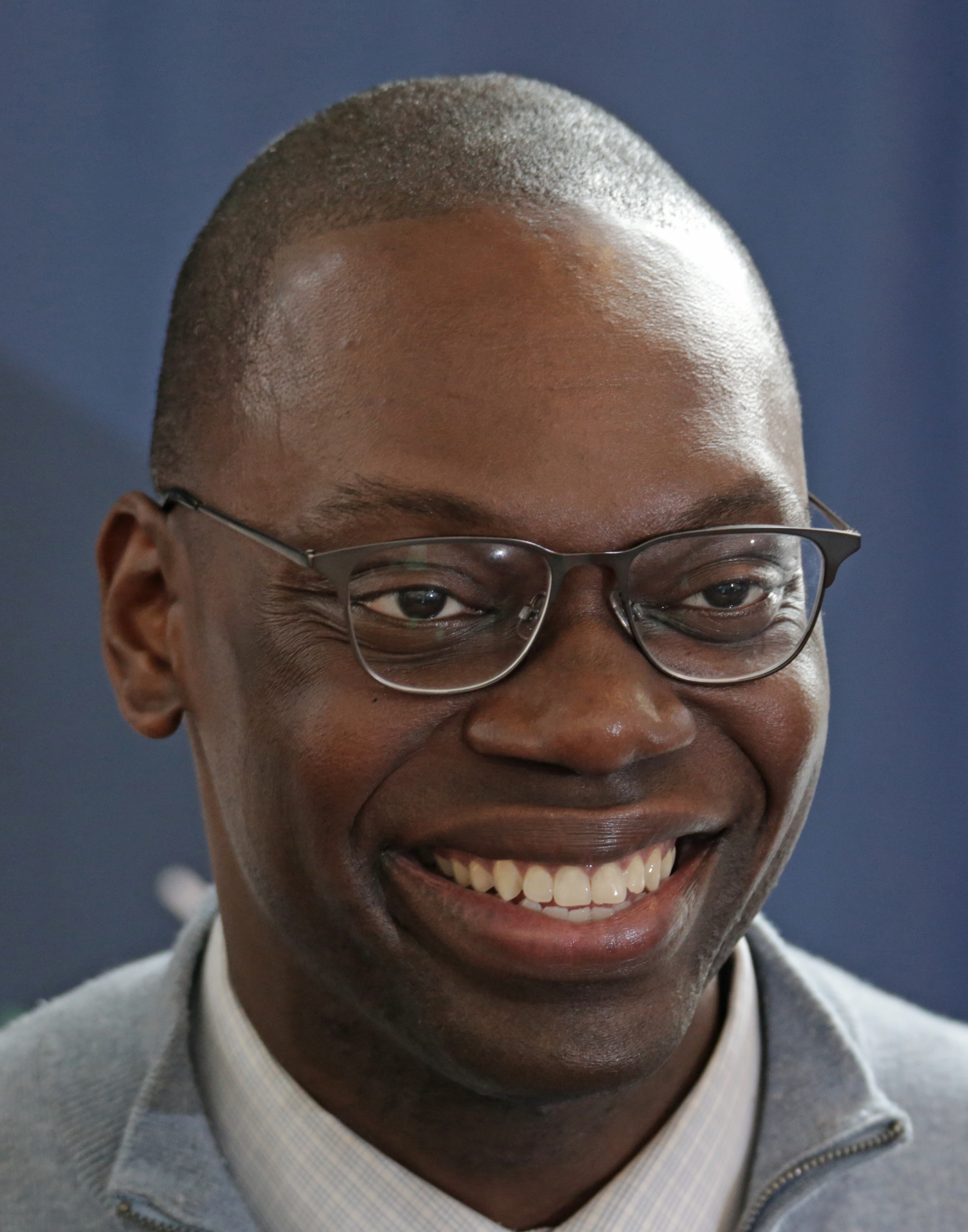
Lieutenant Governor → Secretary of State-elect (elect) Garlin Gilchrist

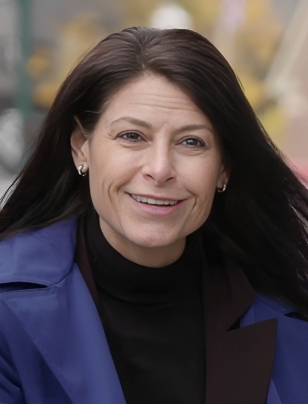
Attorney General Dana Nessel

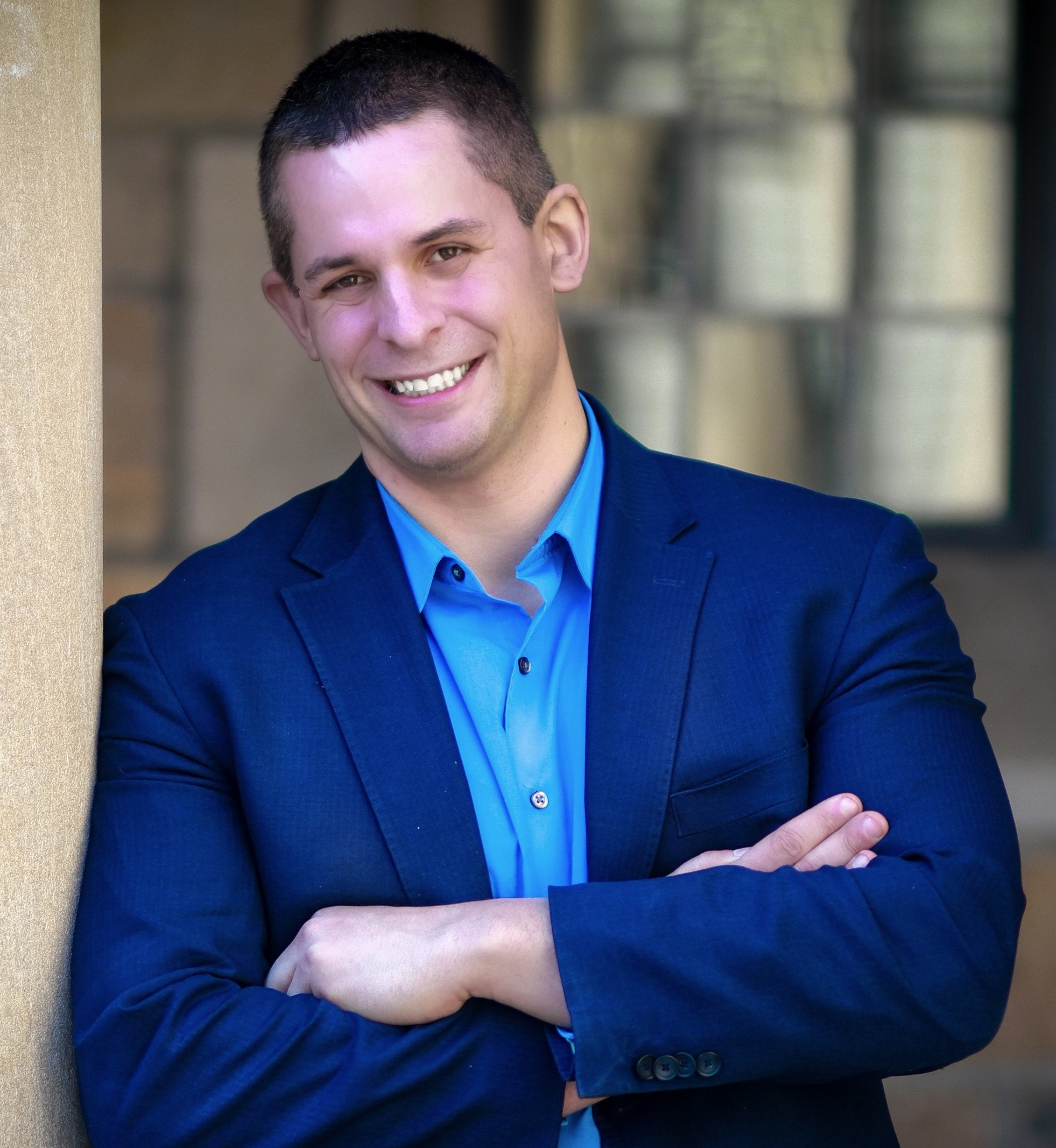
Attorney General-elect Eli Savit

=== State Legislature ===
- Senate Majority Leader: Winnie Brinks
  - Senate President Pro Tempore: Jeremy Moss
- House Minority Leader: Ranjeev Puri
  - Minority Floor leader: John Fitzgerald

=== Mayors ===
- Detroit: Mary Sheffield (1)
- Grand Rapids: David LaGrand (2)*
- Warren: Lori Stone (3)
- Ann Arbor: Christopher Taylor (5)
- Lansing: Andy Schor (6)
- Dearborn: Abdullah Hammoud (7)
- Westland: Kevin Coleman (13)
- Flint: Sheldon Neeley (15)
- Farmington Hills: Theresa Rich
- Kalamazoo: David Anderson
- Royal Oak: Mike Fournier
- Saginaw: Brenda Moore
- Traverse City: Amy Shamroe

== Local groups ==
The party has local branches in all counties throughout the state.

== See also ==
- Political party strength in Michigan
