= John H. Logie =

American lawyer and politician (1939–2021)

Mayor of Grand Rapids
- In office 1992–2003
- Preceded by: Gerald R. Helmholdt
- Succeeded by: George Heartwell

Personal details
- Born: John Hoult Logie; August 11, 1939 Ann Arbor, Michigan, US
- Died: August 4, 2021 (aged 81) Grand Rapids, Michigan, US
- Education: University of Michigan (BA, JD); George Washington University (MA)

Military service
- Branch/service: United States Navy

John Hoult Logie (August 11, 1939 – August 4, 2021) was an American attorney and politician who served as mayor of Grand Rapids, Michigan from 1992 to 2003, one of the longest-serving in the city's history.

== Early life and education ==
Logie was born on August 11, 1939, in Ann Arbor, Michigan and raised in East Grand Rapids, Michigan, where he attended East Grand Rapids High School. He began college at Williams College before earning a Bachelor of Arts from the University of Michigan. He then attended the Officer Candidate School and served in the United States Navy. After five years active duty, he returned to Ann Arbor, Michigan to earn his Juris Doctor from the University of Michigan Law School. He also earned a Master of Arts degree from George Washington University.

== Career ==
Logie joined the Grand Rapids law firm of Warner Norcross & Judd in 1969, where he became a partner until retiring in 2011. During this time he wrote an analysis for Congressman Hal Sawyer validating the legality of president Gerald Ford's pardon of former president Richard Nixon.

He was involved in creating the Heritage Hill Historic District in the area just east of downtown Grand Rapids, where he and his family lived.

Logie ran for mayor in 1991, defeating Robert Vanderson and Sharon Worst. One of his focuses was revitalizing the downtown area, with a new museum and Van Andel Arena among the public-private ventures undertaken. He was involved in state legislation to rewrite and fund environmental cleanups and create reduced-tax "Renaissance Zones" to encourage investment in targeted urban areas. He established an Urban Core Mayors group in Michigan. In 1994 he played a leading role enacting an ordinance protecting the civil rights of LGBT people. In 1997 he began an initiative to address drug use and addiction as public health problems, which included the Mayor's Drug Task Force on Drug Policy Reform and a needle exchange program. He was a supporter of decriminalizing marijuana.

Logie was re-elected twice. During his third term, he backed a city charter amendment that would increase the power of the mayorship, and promised not to run for a fourth term, to avoid the appearance of self-interest. The amendment was not successful, but he stepped down nonetheless. The office was later limited to three terms.

He chaired the board of the Clarke Historical Library at Central Michigan University in Mount Pleasant. He served as president of the Michigan Society of Hospital Attorneys, and the Historical Society of Michigan. He served on the boards of Goodwill Industries, the Grand Rapids PTA Council and the American Cancer Society.

He received the Slykhouse Lifetime Achievement Award from the Economic Club of Grand Rapids, Distinguished Community Trustee Award from Leadership Grand Rapids, the Neighborhood Business Champion Award from the Grand Rapids Neighborhood Alliance, and the Frank J. Kelley Public Service Award from the State Bar of Michigan. He was awarded honorary degrees from Central Michigan University and Ferris State University.

The John Logie Fellows Program is an internship facilitated by Grand Valley State University that allows students to work within the Grand Rapids city government.

== Personal life ==
Logie met his wife, Susan Duerr, in San Diego, California, when he was stationed there by the Navy and she was in a teaching program. They have three children, including an adopted daughter from Korea.

In June 2016, he announced that he had Alzheimer's disease. He died from complications of the condition on August 4, 2021, at the age of 81.

Political offices
Preceded by Gerald R. Helmholdt	Mayor of Grand Rapids, Michigan; 1992-2003	Succeeded by George Heartwell
