= Rosalynn Bliss =

Former mayor of Grand Rapids

Mayor of Grand Rapids
- In office January 1, 2016 – January 1, 2025
- Preceded by: George Heartwell
- Succeeded by: David LaGrand

Personal details
- Born: August 3, 1975 (age 51) Sault Ste. Marie, Michigan, U.S.
- Party: Democratic
- Education: University of South Alabama (BA); Michigan State University (MSW)

Rosalynn Bliss (born August 3, 1975) is an American politician, social worker, and former mayor of Grand Rapids, Michigan. The first woman to be elected mayor of Michigan's second-largest city, Bliss took office on January 1, 2016 and served until the end of 2024. Bliss previously served on the Grand Rapids City Commission.

== Early life and education ==
Bliss comes from a large family with 10 children.

Bliss grew up in the Upper Peninsula of Michigan in Sault Ste. Marie and graduated from Sault Area High School in 1993. Shortly after, she moved to Mobile, Alabama, where she attended the University of South Alabama earning a Bachelor of Arts degree in psychology and criminal justice in 1997.

Upon graduation, she moved to Grand Rapids and began her career working at Hope Network while attending graduate school at Michigan State University. She earned her master's degree in social work and professionally started working in the field of domestic violence and child welfare. Originally, Bliss wanted to be a meteorologist up until she took calculus class in college.

== Personal life ==
Bliss is an active member of her community and loves the outdoors. Her favorite place is the Two Hearted River in the U.P. and she says that she would like to kayak the entire length of the Grand River one day. She also enjoys music festivals as well as listening to local musicians. She stated that her favorite song is Cat Stevens' “Father & Son” from Tea for the Tillerman.

== Career ==
Bliss formerly served as director of residential services at DA Blodgett-St. John's, which provides emergency shelter and residential services for abused and neglected children. She also served as adjunct professor of social work at Grand Valley State University for 10 years and currently serves as the Frederik Meijer Endowed Chair in Entrepreneurship and Innovation in Grand Valley's Frederik Meijer Honors College.

Bliss has served on numerous other boards and organizations, including the Kent County Land Bank Authority, Downtown Development Authority, and Experience Grand Rapids.. Bliss was also president of the Michigan Municipal League. She was also appointed by Governor Rick Snyder to serve on the Child Lead Poisoning Elimination Board.

== Political campaigns ==
Bliss was first elected to the Grand Rapids City Commission in 2005. She was re-elected in 2009 and 2013. During her time as a city commissioner, she led a Blue Ribbon Panel on Parks, was a founding member of the non-profit organization Friends of Grand Rapids Parks and served on the millage campaign for Parks, Pools and Playgrounds. She served on the Uptown Corridor Improvement District and was a part of the Fulton Street Farmers Market Redevelopment, among other neighborhood and community initiatives.

In 2015, Mayor George Heartwell was prohibited from seeking a fourth term. Bliss was one of four candidates who entered the race to succeed Heartwell; the others were Robert Dean, John George, and Willard Lee. A primary election was held on August 4, 2015; Bliss received 66% of the vote. Because she won a majority of the vote, Bliss was elected in the primary election without a need for a runoff election.

She won re-election on November 5, 2019. She defeated Daniel Schutte with over 83% of the vote. Bliss received 23,717 votes compared to Schutte, who only received 4,476 votes. For Bliss’s second mayoral run, her campaign fund totaled to $87,200 going into election week.

== Mayor of Grand Rapids ==
Bliss became the 60th mayor of Grand Rapids on January 1, 2016. She is the first woman to hold that role, as well as the youngest mayor in 130 years.

Bliss’s first words as mayor were in regards to George Hartwell, the previous mayor of Grand Rapids. She expressed her gratitude by saying, “I am standing on the shoulders of many great leaders who came before me.” During Bliss’s first term as mayor, she was joined on the commission by newcomers Jon O’Connor and David Allen who were both former school board members. As well as Ruth Kelly who was re-elected and library commissioners Rachel Anderson, James Botts and Sophia Brewer.

During her inaugural State of the City speech, Bliss expressed her entire to-do list. This consisted of, “Foster racial equity, Provide more affordable housing. Enliven neighborhoods, Strengthen schools. Restore the Grand River’s rapids. Solve homelessness. Grow the local economy.”

=== Implicit bias training ===
Another major action Bliss took in her first term as mayor was she was able to work with city workers to begin getting them implicit bias training. Bliss strongly believed this was important as she states, “We must confront a difficult issue that has grown to an unacceptable proportion in our city…It starts with how the city government looks and how we think. We learn to honestly assess our own biases, and know how those biases impact others, specifically in how they result in denying opportunities for others.”

=== Police–community relations ===
During her first term as mayor, Bliss also chose to prioritize bettering police–community relations. She refers to the police force as the “canopy that covers our neighborhoods” and highly emphasizes the fact that a community and a police force would be stronger working together.

=== Money for neighborhoods ===
Bliss secured agreement from other commissioners to establish a fund for local neighborhood projects. According to Bliss, the initiative aims to provide a new method for residents to collaborate on community projects.

=== Blight fight ===
At the beginning of Bliss’s mayoral term, she also urged colleagues to pass an ordinance in order to hold property owners accountable for blighted vacant properties. Bliss strongly believes that these vacant properties contribute to the lack of success in a neighborhood. “We can’t allow these properties to drag down neighborhoods like a diseased tree branch that, if left untrimmed, the disease spreads.”

=== Environmental sustainability ===
Bliss also created a general plan for the Grand Rapids movement towards sustainability. Some goals were to provide a city park within walking distance of all the citizens, completely make the change to renewable energy throughout the entire city by 2025, increase recycling habits, increase the tree canopy to 40% throughout the city, and pave over 100 miles of bike lanes to stray away from the use of motor vehicles.

As mayor, Bliss joined 130 US mayors launching a ten-minute walk to a park campaign. She has been a proponent of environmental sustainability with the city, twice receiving gold certification from the Michigan Green Communities Network in the Michigan Green Communities Challenge for their work in approving a bicycle action plan, zero cities project, having a strategic plan with sustainability as a core value and converting the city's yard waste site to a composting facility.

=== Housing ===
Bliss established the Housing Advisory Committee in 2016 and tasked it with coming up with recommendations to improve zoning ordinances and increase the city’s affordable housing supply. Of the city's eleven recommendations, nearly all of them were approved throughout 2018 and 2019. The goals that resulted in this process were aimed to allow for reduce requirements for duplexes, accessory dwelling units, protect applicants against predatory application fees and create an affordable housing density bonus.

In her 2022 State of the City address, Bliss stated: "A four percent growth rate means that we need to build not dozens, not hundreds of more homes, we need to build thousands of more homes as quickly as possible," noting that affordable housing is already on the way. "We're currently tracking an additional 700 affordable new housing units in the development pipeline, and many of these units will be online and available in 2023."

=== Economic goals ===
Bliss implemented a food truck ordinance for Grand Rapids. “That was an economic development issue because it’s an entry point for entrepreneurs who don’t have a significant amount of access to capital to open a brick and mortar,” Bliss said. "Knowing that many entrepreneurs get their foot in the door through a food truck, I wanted to create that opportunity for folks in our community. She stated, “I also believe food trucks add to the vibrancy of a community."

=== River restoration ===
Mayor Bliss hopes to restore the aesthetic and accessibility of the Grand River in the City of Grand Rapids. She said, “Imagine being at Riverside Park and seeing rowing on the river, canoeing or kayaking through the city, and the eventual capacity to ride your bike on a 10-mile urban trail all along the river from Riverside Park to Millenium Park and beyond.” Bliss stated that she hopes her policies will bring the Grand Rapids community closer. She then went on to say, “These are realistic dreams. The groundwork has already started to restore our namesake – Grand Rapids.”

=== COVID-19 ===
During the COVID-19 pandemic Bliss made sure to keep in touch with her community. In her letter she states safety precautions that could be taken in order to protect those who could be highly affected by the pandemic. She also went on to express the fact that there were many services being offered throughout the city of Grand Rapids. She also urged citizens to stay informed on the latest updates and initial steps towards combatting the pandemic.
