= Robert Dean (Michigan politician) =

American politician (born 1954)

Member of the Michigan House of Representatives from the 75th district
- In office January 1, 2007 – December 31, 2010
- Preceded by: Jerry Kooiman
- Succeeded by: Brandon Dillon

Personal details
- Born: February 14, 1954 (age 72) Grand Rapids
- Party: Democratic
- Spouse: Betty Dean

Robert Dean (born February 14, 1954) is a politician from the state of Michigan. He is a former member of the Michigan House of Representatives. His district was in the eastern portion of the city of Grand Rapids. He is a Democrat.

== Early life ==
Dean graduated from Grand Rapids Central High School in 1972. Dean worked for Interstate Brands Corporation in Grand Rapids, where he also was an American Federation of Labor and Congress of Industrial Organizations union member for nine years. In 1990 he was elected to the Grand Rapids Public School Board, where he served until 1997.

In 1999, Dean was elected City Commissioner where he served until 2006, when he resigned to run for the State House.

== Political career ==
Dean filed to run for the 75th district in early 2006. Popular Rep. Jerry Kooiman did not run for re-election due to term-limits. Dean had little primary opposition. In the general election, Dean faced off against Republican Tim Doyle. It was one of the most closely watched races in Michigan. Dean won by only 1,500 votes. In the House, Dean sat on the Commerce, Education, Families and Children's Services, and Military and Veterans Affairs and Homeland Security Committees.

He unsuccessfully ran in the 2015 Grand Rapids mayoral election.

== Personal ==
In 1980, Dean founded the New Life Church of God in Christ, and has been its Pastor for the past 30 years. Dean has been married to Betty Dean for 35 years and has two children and five grandchildren.
