= David LaGrand =

American politician

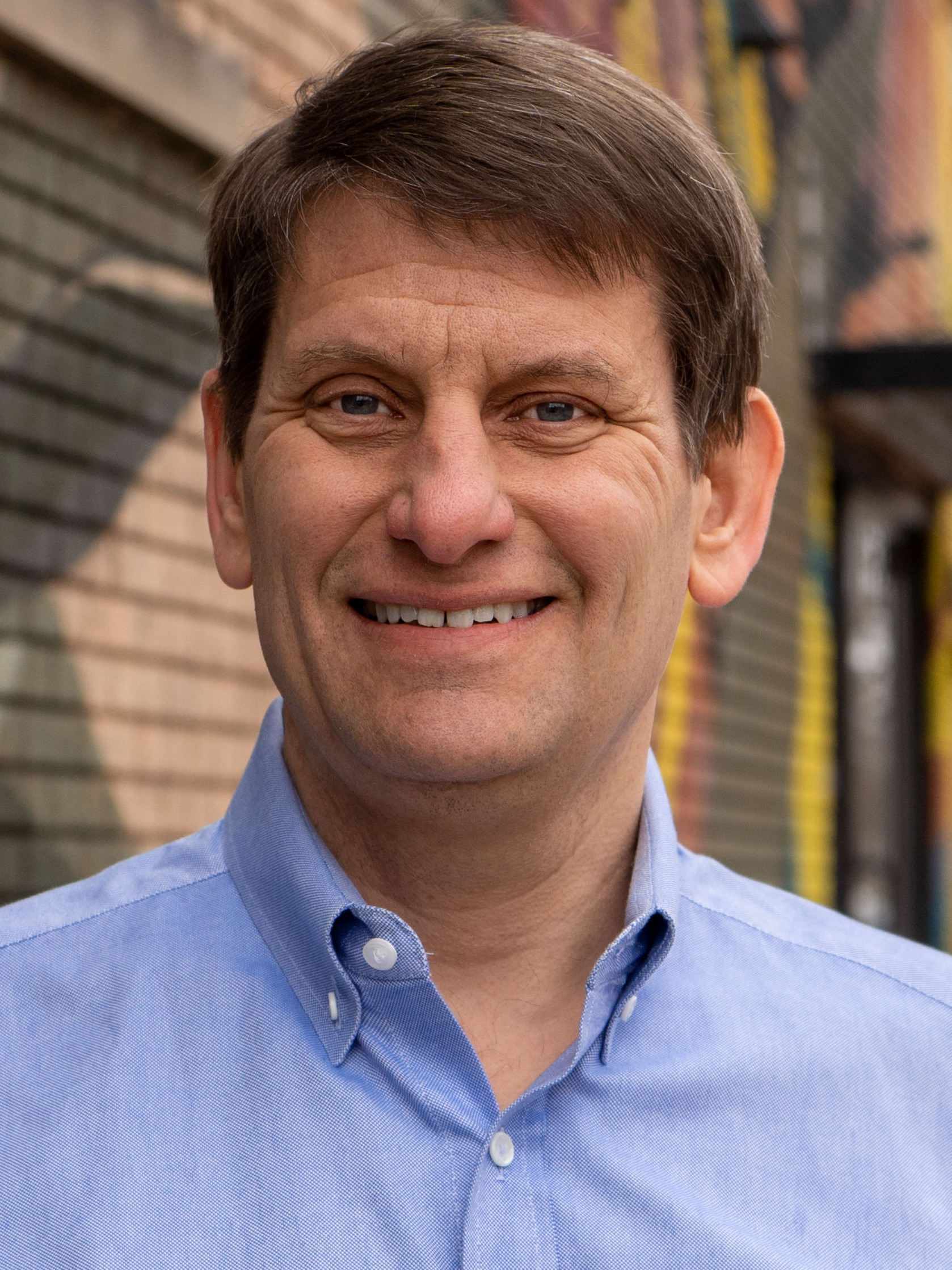

Mayor of Grand Rapids
- Incumbent
- Assumed office January 1, 2025
- Preceded by: Rosalynn Bliss

Member of the Michigan House of Representatives from the 75th district
- In office March 15, 2016 – January 1, 2023
- Preceded by: Brandon Dillon
- Succeeded by: Penelope Tsernoglou

Personal details
- Born: August 13, 1966 (age 60) Grand Rapids, Michigan, US
- Party: Democratic
- Spouse: Melissa LaGrand
- Education: Calvin University (BA); University of Chicago School of Law (JD)
- Website: https://davidlagrand.com

David LaGrand (born August 13, 1966) is an American lawyer, businessman, and politician serving as the mayor of Grand Rapids, Michigan since 2025. A member of the Democratic Party, he previously represented the 75th district in the Michigan House of Representatives from 2016 to 2023.

== Early life and education ==
LaGrand attended Calvin College (now Calvin University) where he served as editor of the school news paper and graduated in 1988 with a degree in history. During college, LaGrand paid for his studies by running his own construction firm. LaGrand met his wife, Melissa, while they were both students at Calvin.

He earned his J.D. degree from the University of Chicago Law School in 1992 before returning to Grand Rapids to begin work at Warner, Norcross & Judd. During this time, LaGrand and his wife, along with two college friends, formed Four Friends Coffee Shop in downtown Grand Rapids on Monroe Center. LaGrand left Warner Norcross to serve as an Assistant Kent County Prosecutor.

== Career ==
After eight years in the Prosecutors Office, LaGrand formed a private law firm with Gerald Lykins. In 2007, LaGrand formed another law firm with Christopher Yates and Paul Denenfeld. In 2002, the LaGrands and their neighbors started Wealthy Street Bakery. In 2013, the LaGrands and partners opened Long Road Distillers, which operates a distillery and restaurants in Grand Rapids and Grand Haven.

LaGrand served as Grand Rapids City Commission for the Second Ward between 2007 and 2010. LaGrand ran unsuccessfully for State Senate in 2010 against Republican Dave Hildenbrand. LaGrand served on the Grand Rapids Public School Board between 2012 and 2015.

LaGrand won a special election to 75th District for the Michigan State House of Representatives on March 8, 2016. He won the primary election against Michael Scruggs with 81.16% of the vote and the general election against Blake Edmonds with 76.47% of the vote. LaGrand served nine years in the State House.

LaGrand served as the Minority Vice Chair of the Judiciary Committee and wrote, introduced, and sponsored Michigan's Criminal Expungement legislation. LaGrand was a major advocate for financial disclosure and government transparency during his tenure in the State House and disclosued his personal finances. LaGrand opposed efforts to make English Michigan's official language, giving a floor speech in the Michigan House of Representatives where he said "If we start to be a country that shuns differences and that we do not welcome diversity, which has always been a strength, this is a dark moment for our republic.” In February 2022, following the Chatfield Scandal, LaGrand introduced legislation to allow evidence of grooming to refute claims of consent in sexual assault or abuse cases.

In 2022, due to term limits in the State House, LaGrand ran for the Michigan State Senate in the 30th district. LaGrand lost the general election to Republican Mark Huizenga by 391 votes, the narrowest race in the 2022 cycle.

LaGrand announced his campaign for Grand Rapids Mayor on May 30, 2023. He won in a landslide with 63.36% of the vote against former City Commissioner Senita Lenear.

He lives in Grand Rapids with his wife, Melissa LaGrand, and four children: John, Issac, Helen, and Julia.
