= George Heartwell =

American politician

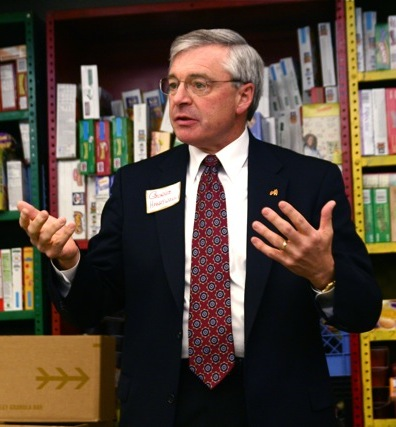

Mayor of Grand Rapids, Michigan
- In office January 1, 2004 – January 1, 2016
- Preceded by: John H. Logie
- Succeeded by: Rosalynn Bliss

Personal details
- Education: Albion College
- Website: Official website

George Heartwell is an American politician. He was the mayor of Grand Rapids in the U.S. state of Michigan. He was sworn in on January 1, 2004, and exited his mayoral duties after ending his third term on January 16, 2016.

== Education ==
Heartwell graduated from Albion College in 1971. He later earned a Master of Divinity (M.Div.) degree from Western Theological Seminary in Holland, Michigan, and was ordained as a minister in the Reformed Church in America and later the United Church of Christ.

== Career ==
Prior to being mayor, Heartwell was a City Commissioner for the third ward of Grand Rapids from 1992-1999. Heartwell currently serves as President and CEO of Pilgrim Manor Retirement Community. He was Director of the Community Leadership Institute at Aquinas College, where he also was a professor in the Community Leadership undergraduate study program. Mayor Heartwell is an ordained minister for the United Church of Christ, and served for 14 years at Heartside Ministry, a program for the homeless in Grand Rapids. He was previously the president of Heartwell Mortgage Corporation. In August, 2007, Mayor Heartwell was re-elected to a second mayoral term in Grand Rapids. He won the primary election with 51% of the vote, eliminating the need for a general election run-off. He would be reelected for a third term in 2011. He was the first Grand Rapids mayor to be term-limited out of office; during his third term in office voters approved a revision of the city charter limiting all future Grand Rapids mayors to two four-year terms. These revisions prevented Heartwell from running for a fourth term.

Heartwell was the first politician to announce the death of former President Gerald R. Ford on December 26, 2006, and, along with then-President George W. Bush, then-Senator Harry Reid and then-Governor Jennifer Granholm, spoke at Ford's Grand Rapids funeral, which took place the day after Ford's Washington, D.C. funeral.

== Honors ==
- 2005 - Albion College Distinguished Alumni Award

Political offices
Preceded by John H. Logie	Mayor of Grand Rapids, Michigan; 2004 - 2016	Succeeded by Rosalynn Bliss
