= 2002 in Michigan =

- Decades: 1980s; 1990s; 2000s; 2010s; 2020s
- See also: History of Michigan; Historical outline of Michigan; List of years in Michigan; 2002 in the United States

This article reviews 2002 in Michigan, including the state's office holders, largest public companies, performance of sports teams, a chronology of the state's top news and sports stories, and notable Michigan-related births and deaths.

== Top stories ==
- Catholic Church sexual abuse cases - More than a dozen priests were banned from practicing public ministry in the Detroit archdiocese. Four priests were prosecuted in Wayne County, two pleading guilding and one convicted.
- KMart went bankrupt in January, laid off 22,000 workers and closed 283 stores.
- Democrat Jennifer Granholm won the November gubernatorial election, but Republicans took control of Michigan's Congressional delegation in the House by a 9-6 majority.
- With rebates and low-interest financing, domestic auto sales reached 16.7 million, the fourth best auto-sales year ever, but the lowest since 1999.
- Ford began the year with 21,500 layoffs and the closure of five plants as par of a $4.1-billion cost-cutting plan.
- Eminem's "8 Mile" movie was released.
- West Nile virus spread to Michigan with 553 confirmed cases and 47 deaths, second only to Illinois.

The state's top sports stories included:

- The 2001–02 Detroit Red Wings won the Stanley Cup championship. Scotty Bowman and Dominik Hašek retired at the end of the season.
- Ford Field opened in Detroit, and the Detroit Lions left the Pontiac Silverdome behind. The Lions were 3–13 in their first season at Ford Field.
- Ernie Harwell retired after 42 years of broadcasting the Detroit Tigers. The Tigers honored him with a statue at Comerica Park.
- Bobby Williams was fired two days after a 49-3 loss to Michigan. John L. Smith was hired as his replacement after the season ended.
- The Detroit Tigers compiled a 55–106 record under managers Phil Garner and Luis Pujols. Alan Trammell was hired as manager after the season ended. Kirk Gibson was hired as bench coach.
- Former U-M quarterback Tom Brady led the New England Patriots to a Super Bowl championship.

== Office holders ==
=== State office holders ===
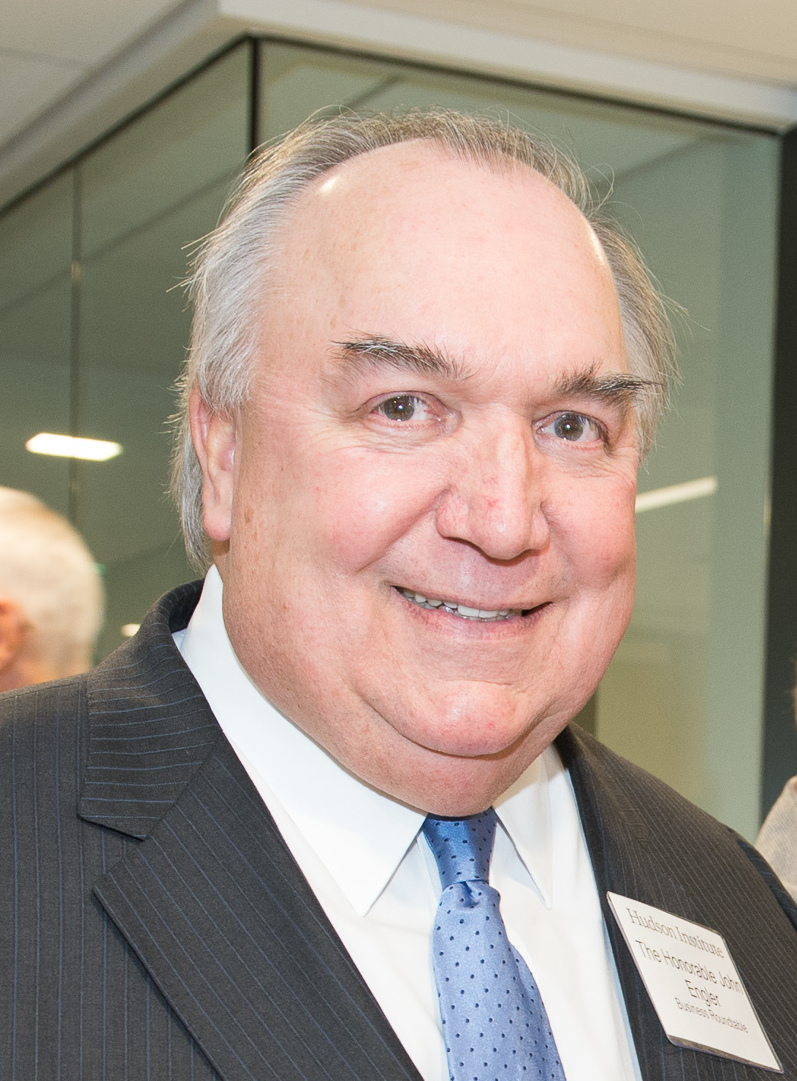
John Engler

- Governor of Michigan - John Engler (Republican)
- Lieutenant Governor of Michigan: Dick Posthumus (Rpublican)
- Michigan Attorney General - Jennifer Granholm (Democrat)
- Michigan Secretary of State - Richard H. Austin (Democrat)
- Speaker of the Michigan House of Representatives: Rick Johnson (Republican)
- Majority Leader of the Michigan Senate: Dan DeGrow (Republican)
- Chief Justice, Michigan Supreme Court: Maura D. Corrigan

=== Federal office holders ===
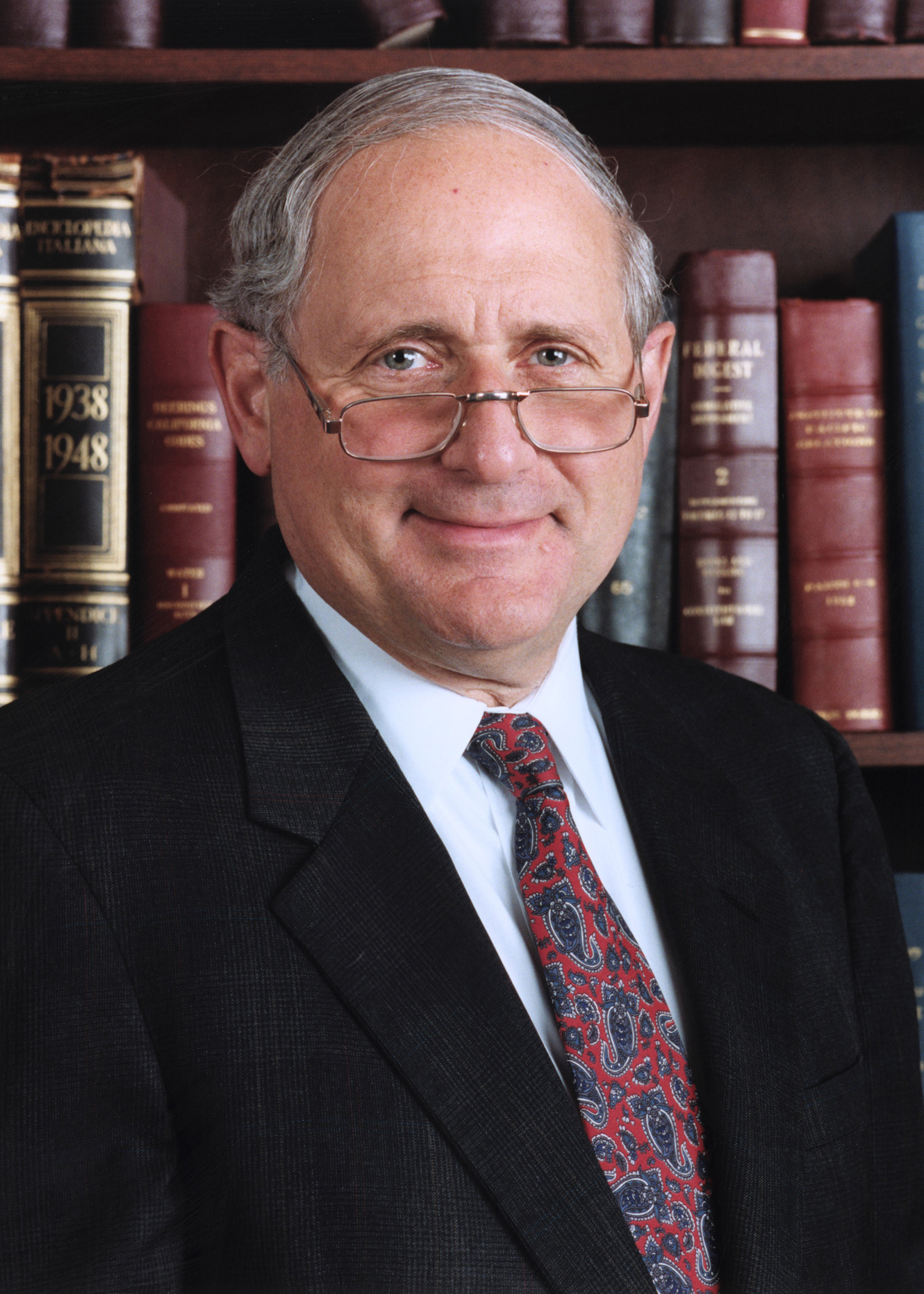
Carl Levin

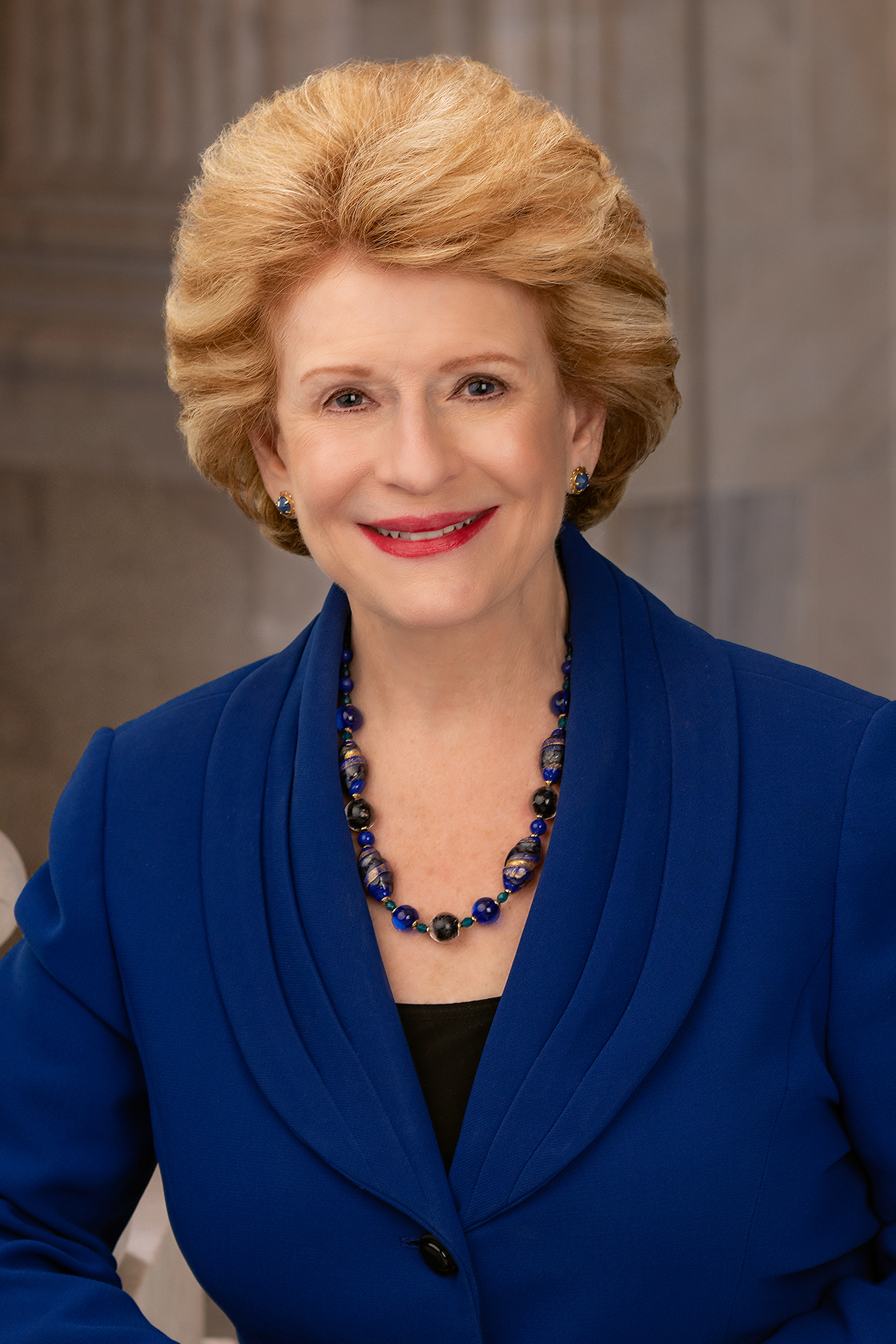
Debbie Stabenow

- U.S. senator from Michigan: Debbie Stabenow (Democrat])
- U.S. senator from Michigan: Carl Levin (Democrat)
- House District 1: Bart Stupak (Democrat)
- House District 2: Pete Hoekstra (Republican)
- House District 3: Vern Ehlers (Republican)
- House District 4: Dave Camp (Republican)
- House District 5: Dale Kildee (Democrat)
- House District 6: Fred Upton (Republican)
- House District 7: Nick Smith (Republican)
- House District 8: Mike Rogers (Republican)
- House District 9: Joe Knollenberg (Democrat)
- House District 10: Candice Miller (Republican)
- House District 11: Thaddeus McCotter (Republican)
- House District 12: Sander Levin (Democrat)
- House District 13: Lynn N. Rivers (Democrat)
- House District 14: John Conyers (Democrat)
- House District 14: Carolyn Cheeks Kilpatrick (Democrat)
- House District 16: John Dingell (Democrat)

=== Mayors of major cities ===
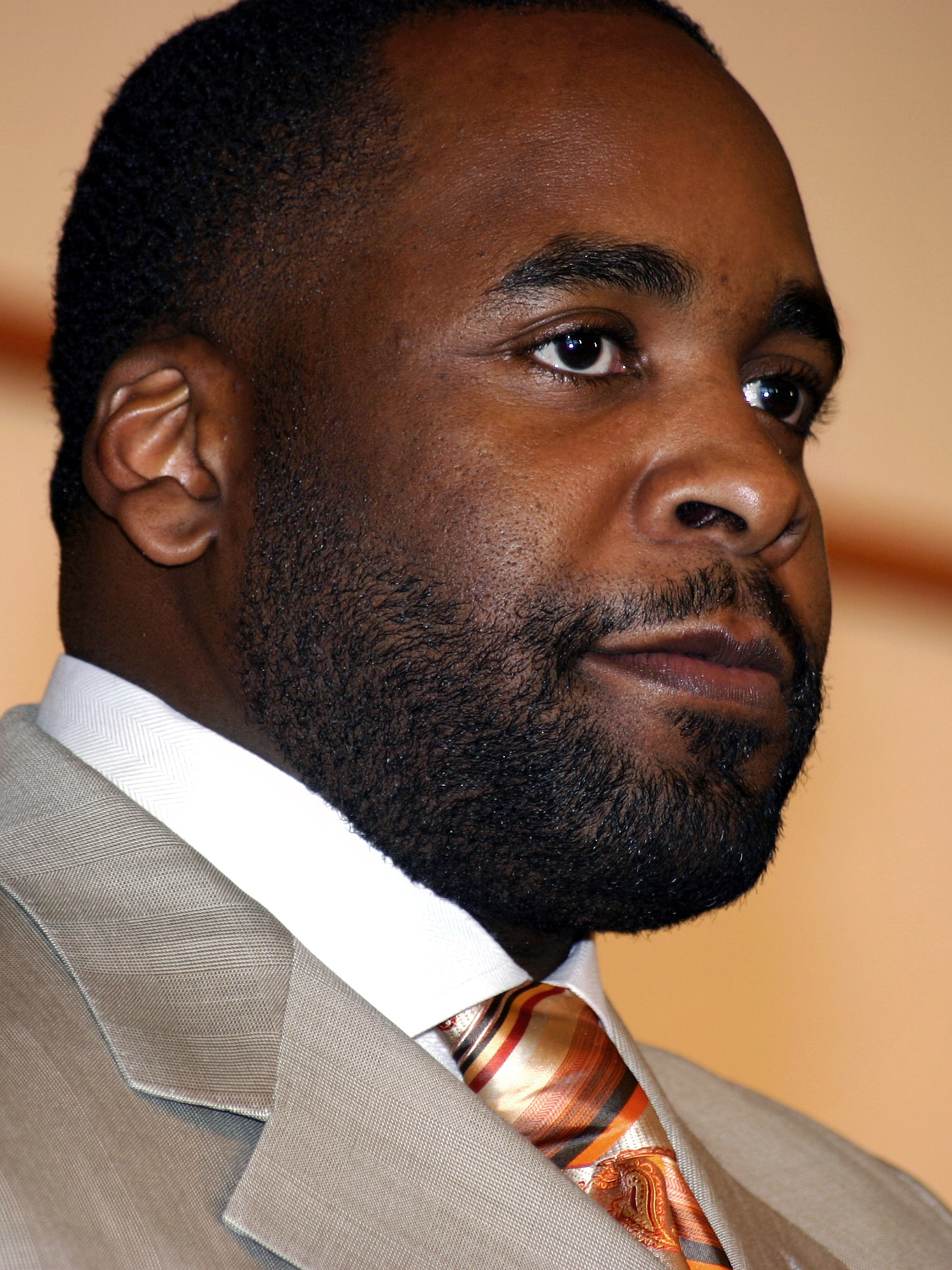
Kwame Kilpatrick

- Mayor of Detroit: Kwame Kilpatrick (Democrat)
- Mayor of Grand Rapids: John H. Logie
- Mayor of Ann Arbor: John Hieftje (Democrat)
- Mayor of Lansing: Antonio Benavides
- Mayor of Flint: James W. Rutherford
- Mayor of Saginaw: Wilmer Jones Ham

== Largest public companies ==
In April 2003, the Detroit Free Press released its annual "The Free Press 50" list of the largest Michigan-based public companies based on 2002 revenues. The top 20 companies are shown below.

Rank	Company	Headquarters	Business	2003 revenue (in millions)	Rev. change from 2001	2003 profit (in millions)	Profit change from 2001
1	General Motors	Detroit	Autos	$186,763	5.36%	1,736	188.85%
2	Ford	Dearborn	Autos	$163,420	1.18%	-$980	82.03%
3	Kmart	Troy	Retailer	$30,762	-14.91%	-$3,219	-31.60%
4	Dow Chemical Company	Midland	Chemicals	$27,609	-1.66%	-$338	12.21%
5	Delphi	Troy	Auto supplier	$27,427	5.13%	$343	-
6	Visteon	Dearborn	Auto supplier	$18,395	3.09%	-$352	-198.31%
7	Lear Corporation	Southfield	Auto supplier	$14,424	5.87%	$13	-50.57%
8	Whirlpool Corporation	Benton Harbor	Appliances	$11,016	6.51%	-$391	--
9	Masco	Taylor	Building products	$9,419	13.71%	$589	+197.08%
10	CMS Energy	Dearborn	Utility	$8,687	7.74%	-$620	-38.39%
11	Kellogg's	Battle Creek	Food	$8,304	10.01%	$720	52.22%
12	PulteGroup	Bloomfield Hills	Home builders	$7,471	38.64%	$453	+50.52%
13	United Auto Group	Detroit	Auto franchise operator	$7,434	26.65%	$62	39.08%
14	Arvin Meritor	Troy	Auto supplier	$7,025	4.66%	$170	$1,114%
15	DTE Energy	Detroit	Utility	$6,749	16.54%	632	90.36%
16	Federal-Mogul	Southfield	Auto supplier	$5,422	-0.63%	-$1,628	-62.65%
17	Kelly Services	Troy	Staffing	$4,323	1.56%	$18	12.21%
18	Collins & Aikman	Troy	Auto supplier	$3,885	113.12%	-$53.50	-15.80%
19	Comerica	Detroit	Financial services	$3,697	-12.60%	$601	-15.35%
20	Borders	Ann Arbor	Books, music, video	3,486	2.90%	$111	27.80%

== Sports ==
=== Baseball ===
- 2002 Detroit Tigers season - Following an 0-6 start to the season manager Phil Garner was fired and replaced by Luis Pujols for the remainder of the season. The Tigers finished the season with a 55–106 record and in last place in the American League Central. Designated Randall Simon hitter led the team in batting with 19 home runs, 82 RBIs, and a .301 batting average. The team's pitching staff was led by Mark Redman with an 8-15 win-loss recor and 109 strikeouts.

=== American football ===
- 2002 Detroit Lions season - In their second and final season under head coach Marty Mornhinweg, and their first in the newly-completed Ford Field, the Lions compiled a3–13 record and finished last in the NFC North. The team's statistical leaders included Joey Harrington (2,294 passing yards), James Stewart (1,021 rushing yards), Bill Schroeder (595 receiving yards), and Jason Hanson (100 points scored).
- 2002 Michigan Wolverines football team - In their eighth season under head coach Lloyd Carr, the Wolverines compiled a 10–3 record, defeated Florida in the 2003 Outback Bowl, and were ranked No. 9 in the final Ap and coaches polls. The team's statistical leaders included John Navarre (2,905 passing yards), Chris Perry (1,110 rushing yards, 84 points scored), and Braylon Edwards (1,035 receiving yards).
- 2002 Michigan State Spartans football team - In their third season under head coach Bobby Williams, the Spartans compiled a 4–8 record. The team's statistical leaders included Jeff Smoker (1,593 passing yards), David Richard (654 rushing yards), Charles Rogers (1,351 receiving yards, 78 points scored).
- 2002 Grand Valley State Lakers football team - In their 12th season under head coach Brian Kelly, the Lakers finished with a perfect season, compiling a 14–0 record and winning the NCAA Division II national championship with a victory over Valdosta State in the Division II championship game. The team's statistical leaders included Curt Anes (3,692 passing yards), David Kircus (35 touchdowns, 212 points scored), Reggie Spearman (1,500 rushing yards), and Terrance Banks (98 receptions for 1,178 yards)

=== Basketball ===
- 2001–02 Detroit Pistons season - In their first season under head coach Rick Carlisle, the Pistons compiled a 50–32 record, finished first in the NBA Central Division, and lost to the Boston Celtics in the Eastern Conference semifinals. The team's statistical leaders included Ben Wallace (278 blocks and 1,039 rebounds, including 318 offensive rebounds) and Jerry Stackhouse (1,629 points, 403 assists).
- 2002 Detroit Shock season - The Shock finished in last place in WNBA with a 9–23 record.
- 2001–02 Michigan State Spartans men's basketball team - In their seventh season under head coach Tom Izzo, the Spartans compiled a 19–12 record.
- 2001–02 Michigan Wolverines men's basketball team - In their first season under head coach Tommy Amaker, the Wolverines compiled an 11–18 record.

=== Ice hockey ===
- 2001–02 Detroit Red Wings season - .In their ninth and final season under head coach Scotty Bowman, the Red Wings compiled a 51–17–10–4 record and won the Stanley Cup championship, defeating the Carolina Hurricanes in the finals. The team's statistical leaders included Brendan Shanahan (37 goals, 75 points), Nicklas Lidstrom (50 assists), and Chris Chelios (126 penalty minutes). Dominik Hašek won 41 games in goal. Other important contributors included Sergei Fedorov (31 goals, 37 assists), Brett Hull (30 goals, 33 assists), and Luc Robitaille (30 goals, 20 assists).

=== Other ===
- Vengeance (2002) - World Wrestling Entertainment event at Joe Louis Arena in Detroit on July 21
- 2002 Michigan Indy 400
- 2002 Sirius Satellite Radio 400
- 2002 Pepsi 400 presented by Farmer Jack

== Chronology of events ==
- May 16 - Killing of Aiyana Jones
- August 24 - Opening of Ford Field
- October 12 - The Rolling Stones at Ford Field
- November 5 - elections in Michigan

- 2002 Michigan gubernatorial election - Democrat incumbent Jennifer Granholm received 1,631,276 votes (51.42%), defeating Republican challenger Dick Posthumus who received 1,504,755 votes (47.4%).
- 2002 United States Senate election in Michigan - Democrat incumbent Carl Levin received 1,896,614 votes (60.61%, defeating Rocky Raczkowski who received 1,185,545 votes (37.89%).
- 2002 United States House of Representatives elections in Michigan
- 2002 Michigan Senate election
- 2002 Michigan House of Representatives election
- 2002 Michigan Secretary of State election
- 2002 Michigan Attorney General election

== Births ==
- January 3 - Jake Davis, soccer player, in Rochester, Michigan
- January 10 - Isaiah Jackson, basketball player, in Rochester Hills, Michigan
- January 31 - Romedi Llapi, soccer player, in Detroit
- April 10 - Ava Michelle, actress, dancer, model, in Linden, Michigan
- April 22 - Emilea Zingas, figure skater, in Grosse Pointe Farms, Michigan
- July 3 - Ryan Rollins, basketball player, in Macomb, Michigan
- July 21 - Jeffrey Chen, ice dancer, home town Wolverine Lake, Michigan
- September 29 - Chloe Moriondo, singer-songwriter and YouTuber, in Detroit

== Deaths ==
- January 7 - Mighty Igor, professional wrestler, at age 70
- January 21 - George Trapp, basketball player, at age 53
- January 22 - Henry Cosby, Motown songwriter, producer, and musician, at age 73
- January 29 - Night Train Lane, Detroit Lions cornerback (1960-65) and Hall of Fame inductee, at age 73
- March 1 - Maud Farris-Luse, world's oldest living person, at age 115, 25 days
- March 7 - Charles H. Wright, physician and namesake of Charles H. Wright Museum of African American History, at age 83
- March 8 - Harlan Howard, country songwriter and Detroit native, at age 74
- March 22 - Raymond W. Hood, Michigan House of Representatives (1965-1982), at age 66
- April 16 - Robert Urich, actor and Michigan State alum, at age 56
- May 9 - Joe Stroud, Detroit Free Press editorial page editor for 25 years, at age 65
- May 23 - Wally Fromhart, football player and coach, at age 89
- June 30 - Richard Allen, Motown session drummer with the Funk Brothers, at age 69
- July 4 - Winnifred Quick Van Tongerloo, one of the last four Titanic survivors (eight years old at time of sinking), at age 98
- August 1 - Jack Tighe, Detroit Tigers manage (1957-58), at age 88
- August 16 - Stephen Yokich, UAW president (1994-2002), at age 66
- September 2 - Brenda M. Scott, Detroit City Council, at age 47
- September 7 - Erma Franklin, gospel and soul singer and sister of Aretha Franklin, at age 64
- September 11 - Matthew McNeely, first speaker pro tempore of Michigan House (1973-1986), at age 82
- September 12 - Lloyd Biggle Jr., science fiction writer, at age 79
- September 17 - Peter Stroh, head of Stroh Brewery Company and Detroit civic activist, at age 74
- September 24 - Leon Hart, Detroit Lions (1950-57), at age 73
- September 25 - Ray Hayworth, Detroit Tigers catcher (1926, 1929-38), at age 98
- October 9 - Aileen Wuornos, serial killer and Rochester, Michigan native, at age 46
- November 16 - William Henry Kessler, architect (Detroit Receiving Hospital, original Detroit Science Center, Delphi headquarters), at age 77
- November 10 - Johnny Griffith, pianist and keyboard player for the Funk Brothers, at age 66
- November 11 - Kim Hunter, actress, at age 79
- November 13 - Roland Hanna, jazz pianist and composer, at age 70
- November 25 - Charles E. Chamberlain, US Congress (1957-1974), at age 85
- December 4 - Charles Pierce Davey, boxer and boxing commissioner, at age 77

== See also ==
- 2002 in the United States
