= 2002 Michigan elections =

- November 5, 2002

The 2002 Michigan elections were held in the U.S. state of Michigan on November 5, 2002. The state primary was held on August 6.

== Federal ==
=== U.S. Senate ===
Incumbent Democratic senator Carl Levin won re-election against Republican nominee Rocky Raczkowski.

=== U.S. House of Representatives ===
In the 2002 redistricting cycle, Michigan lost one congressional seat, reducing it to 15 congressional districts. Before the 2002 election, Democrats held a 9–7 majority in Michigan's U.S. House delegation. After the 2002 election, Republicans held a 9–6 majority in the delegation.

== Executive ==
=== Governor and lieutenant governor ===
Incumbent Republican governor John Engler was term-limited. Democratic nominee Jennifer Granholm defeated Republican nominee Dick Posthumus.

=== Secretary of state ===
Incumbent Republican secretary of state Candice Miller was term-limited. Republican nominee Terri Lynn Land defeated Democratic nominee Melvin "Butch" Hollowell.

=== Attorney general ===
Incumbent Democratic attorney general Jennifer Granholm sought the governorship in 2002. Republican nominee Mike Cox defeated Democratic nominee Gary Peters.

== Legislature ==
=== Senate ===
Republicans lost a seat in the state Senate but maintained a majority. The election resulted in a 22–16 Republican majority over the Democrats in the chamber.

=== House of Representatives ===
Republicans won 5 seats, increasing their majority in the state House to 63–47 over the Democrats.

== Judiciary ==
=== Supreme Court ===
Incumbent Republicans Elizabeth Weaver and Robert P. Young Jr. won re-election. This preserved the 5–2 Republican majority on the court.

== Michigan State Board of Education and University Boards ==
=== Michigan State Board of Education ===
Republican incumbent Michael Warren sought re-election, while Republican incumbent Sharon A. Wise did not run for re-election. The election was won by Republican Carolyn Curtin and Democrat Elizabeth Bauer, ousting Warren. This increased the Democratic majority on the board to 6–2.

=== Michigan State University Board of Trustees ===
Incumbents Republican Donald Nugent and Democrat Colleen McNamara were re-elected. This preserved the 5–3 Republican majority on the board.

=== University of Michigan Board of Regents ===
Incumbent Republican Andrea Fischer Newman sought re-election, while incumbent Republican Daniel D. Horning did not run for re-election. Republican Andrew Richner was elected and Newman was re-elected. This preserved the 5–3 Democratic majority on the board.

=== Wayne State University Board of Governors ===
Incumbents Democrat Leon Atchison and Republican Diane L. Dunaskiss ran for re-election. Dunaskiss was re-elected, but Democrat Richard H. Bernstein was elected over Atchison. This preserved the 6–2 Democratic majority on the board.

== Ballot initiatives ==
=== Ballot proposals ===
There were two state ballot proposals in Michigan on August 6, 2002. Both were approved. Proposal 1 sought to restructure the payment system for state legislators. Proposal 2 sought to increase the investment options for state environmental funds.

There were 4 state ballot proposals in Michigan on November 5, 2002. Proposal 1, a referendum which sought to ban straight-ticket voting, was rejected. Proposal 2, which sought to authorize the selling of bonds for clean water and sewage projects, was approved. Proposal 3, a state constitutional amendment which sought to guarantee state workers the right to collective bargaining with binding arbitration, was rejected. Proposal 4, a state constitutional amendment which sought to divert funds from a tobacco settlement toward the healthcare industry and smoking prevention, was rejected.

== Local elections ==
The following is an incomplete list of 2002 elections in notable localities.

=== Flint mayoral elections ===
A recall election on March 5, 2002, ousted Flint Mayor Woodrow Stanley. City Administrator Darnell Earley served as mayor until a special election was held to replace Stanley. James W. Rutherford was elected mayor on August 6.
