= Gary Peters =

American politician and naval officer (born 1958)

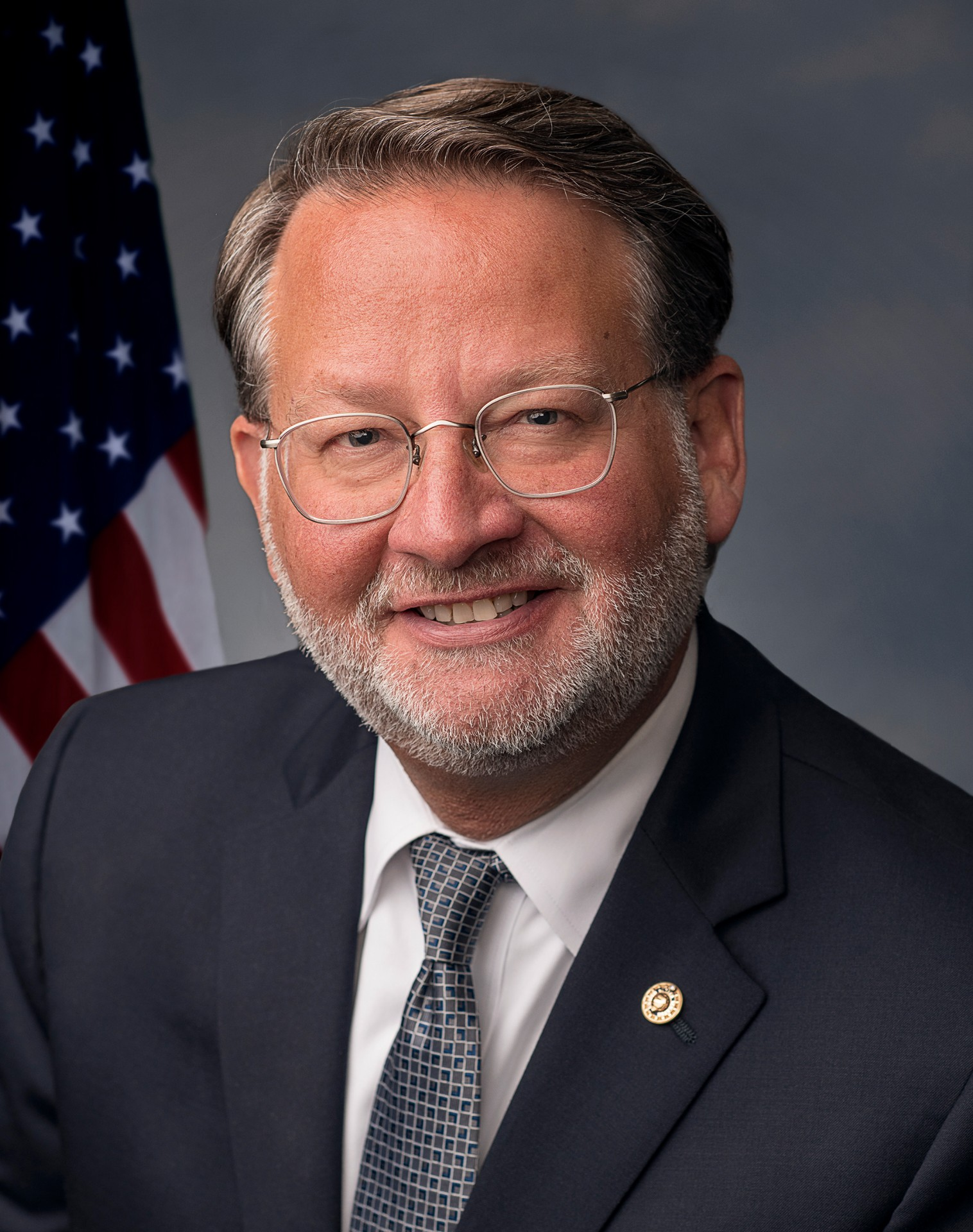
- Official portrait, 2018

United States Senator from Michigan
- Incumbent
- Assumed office January 3, 2015 Serving with Elissa Slotkin
- Preceded by: Carl Levin
Committee positions
Ranking Member of the Senate Homeland Security Committee
Incumbent
Assumed office January 3, 2025
Preceded by	Rand Paul
In office January 3, 2019 – February 3, 2021
Preceded by	Claire McCaskill
Succeeded by	Rob Portman
Chair of the Senate Homeland Security Committee
In office February 3, 2021 – January 3, 2025
Preceded by	Ron Johnson
Succeeded by	Rand Paul
Chair of the Democratic Senatorial Campaign Committee
In office January 28, 2021 – January 3, 2025
Leader	Chuck Schumer
Preceded by	Catherine Cortez Masto
Succeeded by	Kirsten Gillibrand

Member of the U.S. House of Representatives from Michigan
- In office January 3, 2009 – January 3, 2015
- Preceded by: Joe Knollenberg
- Succeeded by: Brenda Lawrence
- Constituency: 9th district (2009–2013); 14th district (2013–2015)

Commissioner of the Michigan Lottery
- In office April 9, 2003 – August 7, 2007
- Governor: Jennifer Granholm
- Preceded by: Jim Kipp
- Succeeded by: Scott Bowen

Member of the Michigan Senate from the 14th district
- In office January 3, 1995 – December 31, 2002
- Preceded by: Jon Cisky
- Succeeded by: Gilda Jacobs

Personal details
- Born: Gary Charles Peters; December 1, 1958 (age 67) Pontiac, Michigan, U.S.
- Party: Democratic
- Spouse: Colleen Ochoa
- Children: 3
- Education: Alma College (BA); University of Detroit Mercy (MBA); Wayne State University (JD, MA); Michigan State University (MA)
- Website: Senate website Campaign website

Military service
- Branch: United States Navy; Navy Reserve
- Service years: 1993–2008
- Rank: Lieutenant Commander
- Unit: Naval Construction Battalion
- Operation: Operation Southern Watch
- Awards: Navy and Marine Corps Achievement Medal
- Peters' voice Peters supporting the Fire Grants and Safety Act. Recorded April 20, 2023

Gary Charles Peters (born December 1, 1958) is an American politician, lawyer, and former naval officer serving as the senior United States senator from Michigan, a seat he has held since 2015. A member of the Democratic Party, he was the U.S. representative for Michigan's 14th congressional district, which included the eastern half of Detroit, the Grosse Pointes, Hamtramck, Southfield, and Pontiac, from 2009 to 2015 (the district was Michigan's 9th congressional district until 2013).

Before his election to Congress, Peters served in the United States Navy Reserve, spent 22 years as an investment advisor, and worked briefly in academia. He was elected to the Rochester Hills City Council in 1991 and represented the 14th district in the Michigan Senate from 1995 to 2002. He was the Democratic nominee for Michigan attorney general in 2002, narrowly losing to Republican Mike Cox. He was then appointed commissioner of the Michigan Lottery by Governor Jennifer Granholm, serving from 2003 to 2008, when he resigned to run for Congress.

In 2014, Peters was elected to the United States Senate, the only non-incumbent Democrat to win a Senate election that year. He was reelected in 2020, defeating Republican nominee John E. James in a close race.

Peters chaired the Democratic Senatorial Campaign Committee in the 2022 and 2024 election cycles. He is the ranking member of the Homeland Security and Governmental Affairs Committee in the 119th Congress. On January 28, 2025, he announced that he will not seek reelection in 2026. He will be succeeded by fellow Democrat Abdul El-Sayed.

== Early life and education ==
Gary Charles Peters was born on December 1, 1958, in Pontiac, Michigan. His father, Herbert Garrett Peters, was a public school teacher who served in the U.S. Army during World War II. His mother, Madeleine Vignier, who met his father in France during the war, was a nurse's aide and helped unionize her workplace. Peters' family has lived in Michigan since the 1840s. He grew up in Oakland County and graduated from Rochester High School.

After high school, Peters attended Alma College, where he graduated magna cum laude in 1980 with a bachelor of arts in political science and was inducted into Phi Beta Kappa. He later earned a master of business administration from the University of Detroit Mercy in 1984. Peters also holds a juris doctor and a master of arts in political science from Wayne State University and a master of arts in philosophy from Michigan State University.

== Military career ==
Peters joined the United States Navy Reserve in 1993 at age 34. He served more than 10 years in units at Selfridge Air National Guard Base, including Naval Mobile Construction Battalion 26. During his Navy service, Peters earned the Seabee combat warfare specialist insignia and carried out assignments as an assistant supply officer.

Peters's reserve duty included time in the Persian Gulf supporting Operation Southern Watch; he served overseas again during increased military activity following the September 11 attacks. Peters attained the rank of lieutenant commander before leaving the Reserve in 2008; his awards include the Navy and Marine Corps Achievement Medal and the Military Outstanding Volunteer Service Medal. In 2018, he received a diploma from the College of Naval Command and Staff, part of the U.S. Naval War College.

== Business and academic career ==
Peters worked for 22 years as a financial advisor, serving as an assistant vice president at Merrill Lynch from 1980 until 1989, when he joined Paine Webber as a vice president.

From 2007 to 2008, Peters served as the third Griffin Endowed Chair in American Government at Central Michigan University. In that part-time position, he taught one class a semester, plus preparing additional student activities including two policy forums, and developing a journal of Michigan politics and policy, for $65,000 a year. Peters announced his candidacy to run for Congress two months after being hired. Some student and faculty members protested Peters's hiring, saying he could not be objective in the classroom while running for office and that the university job was subsidizing his campaign.

Peters also has taught finance at Wayne State and strategic management and business policy courses at Oakland University.

Peters was a senior policy and financial analyst for the Michigan Department of Treasury and served on arbitration panels for the New York Stock Exchange and the Financial Industry Regulatory Authority.

== Michigan Senate (1995–2002) ==
Before serving in the Michigan Senate, Peters served on the Rochester Hills City Council from 1991 to 1993.

=== Elections ===
After a failed attempt in 1990, Peters was elected to the Michigan Senate to represent the Oakland County-based 14th district in November 1994. The district is one of the most diverse state Senate districts – containing nearly every racial, ethnic, and religious group in Michigan. It includes the cities of Pontiac, Bloomfield Hills, Southfield, and Oak Park in southeastern Oakland County. Peters was reelected in 1998 and served until 2002, stepping down then due to the state's term limits. He was succeeded by Gilda Jacobs.

=== Tenure ===
Peters was chosen by his Democratic colleagues to chair his party's caucus. He was also a member of the Michigan Law Revision Commission and served on the Michigan Sentencing Commission. Both the Michigan State House of Representatives and the Senate passed a bill sponsored by Peters which banned any new wells under the state waters of the Great Lakes except in case of a state energy emergency. The bill passed into law without the signature of Governor John Engler.

Peters served as the vice chairman of the Senate Finance, Education, Judiciary and Economic Development Committees. He was also a member of the Natural Resources and the Mental Health and Human Services Committee.

== Statewide elections ==
In 2002, Peters was a candidate for governor and later for Attorney General.

As the Democratic nominee for attorney general, he lost the 2002 election to Republican nominee Mike Cox by about 5,200 votes, a 0.17% margin. Peters decided not to contest the result despite reported irregularities. Several mistakes were reportedly found during analysis, including a precinct in Dearborn that recorded Peters with 96 votes when he actually had 396. The race was Michigan's closest statewide contest since the 1950 gubernatorial race.

In 2003, Michigan governor Jennifer Granholm appointed Peters as the Michigan Lottery commissioner.

== U.S. House of Representatives (2009–2015) ==
=== Elections ===
==== 2008 ====
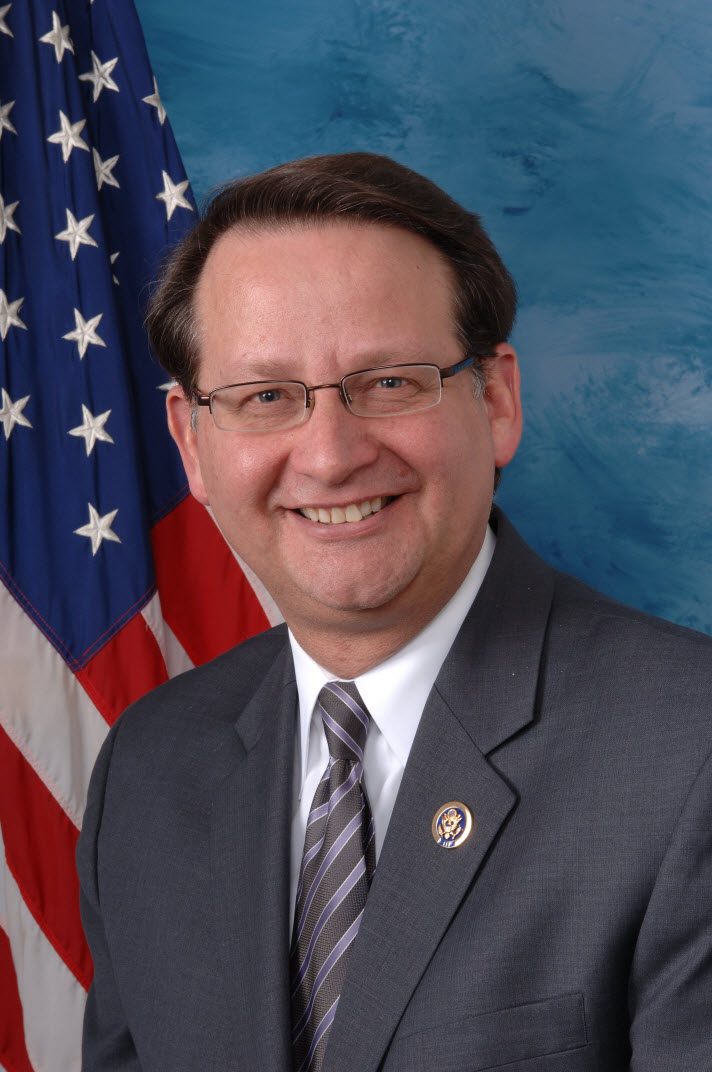
Peters during the 111th Congress

On August 7, 2007, Peters ended months of speculation by formally announcing he would run against eight-term Republican congressman Joe Knollenberg in the 9th district, which included almost all of Oakland County. Peters resigned as state lottery commissioner to devote his full energy to the campaign.

Knollenberg was considered vulnerable due to an increasing Democratic trend in what was once a classic bastion of suburban conservatism. His opponents in 2002 and 2004 had performed significantly below the Democratic base in the district, but he was nearly defeated in 2006 by Nancy Skinner, a former radio talk-show host who spent virtually no money—the closest a Republican had come to losing the district in almost half a century. This led the Democratic Congressional Campaign Committee to target Knollenberg for defeat.

In the 2002 state attorney general race, Peters performed at or above the Democratic base in 72% of the 9th district precincts. In his 1998 state Senate campaign, he performed at or above base in 99% of the precincts.

Peters won the November 4 election by 33,524 votes, taking 52% of the vote to Knollenberg's 43%. Barack Obama carried Oakland County by 15 points; roughly two-thirds of Oakland County was in the 9th. Peters was the fourth person and first Democrat to represent the district since its creation in 1933 (it was the 17th district from 1933 to 1953, the 18th from 1953 to 1973, the 19th from 1973 to 1983, the 18th from 1983 to 1993, and the 11th from 1993 to 2003, becoming the 9th in 2003).

==== 2010 ====
Michigan's 9th congressional district in 2010

In November 2010, Peters defeated challenges by Republican Andrew "Rocky" Raczkowski, Libertarian Adam Goodman, Independent Bob Gray, Independent Matthew Kuofie, and Green Douglas Campbell.

==== 2012 ====
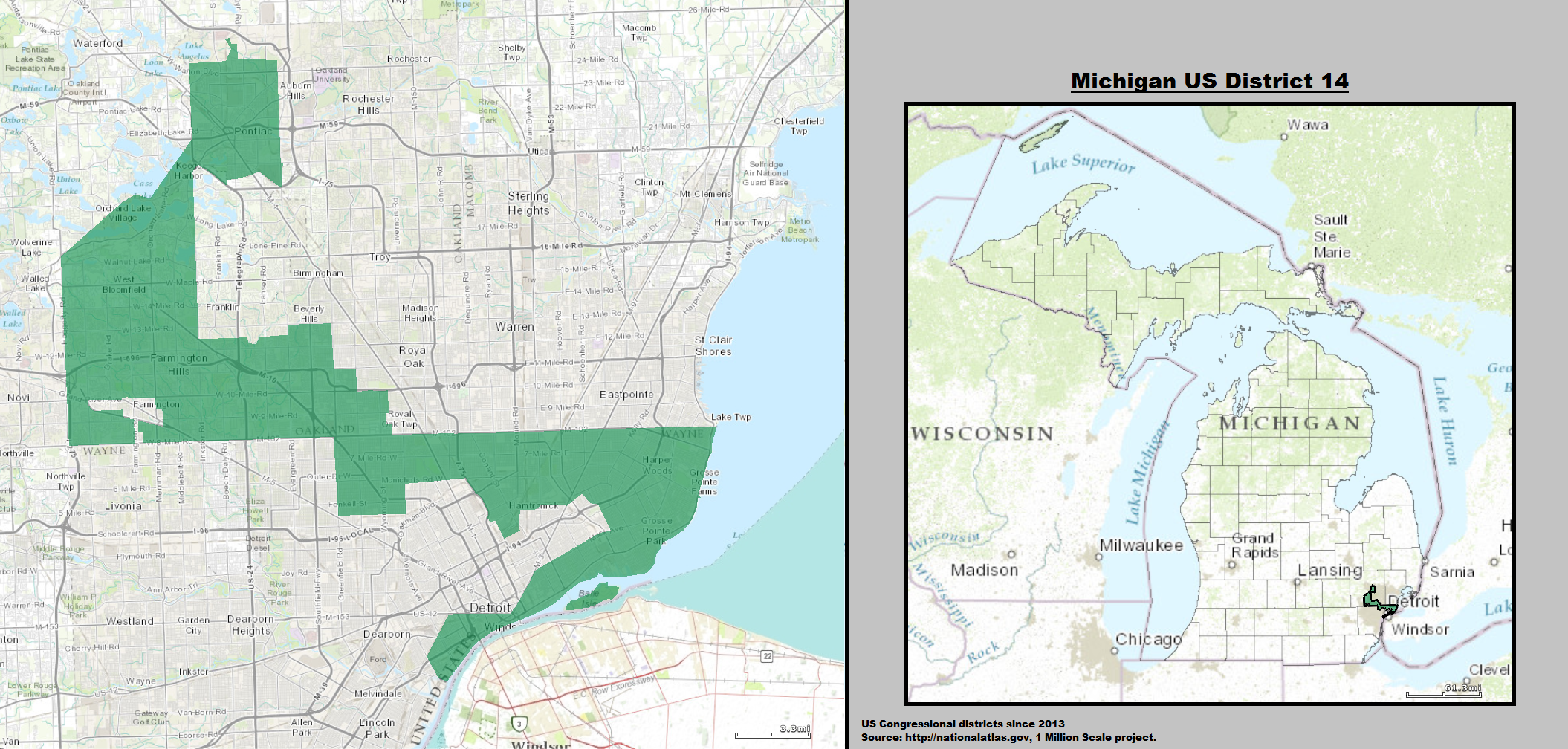
Michigan's 14th congressional district since 2013

Due to the state's population decline, as reflected by the 2010 census, Michigan lost one congressional district. As a result of the subsequent redistricting of House seats, much of Peters's 9th district, including his home in Bloomfield Hills, was merged with the 12th district, represented by fellow Democrat Sander Levin. The new district retained Peters's district number (the 9th) but geographically was more Levin's district.

In September 2011, Peters opted to run in the newly redrawn 14th district. The district had previously been the 13th district, represented by freshman Democrat Hansen Clarke. The redrawn district is based in Detroit, but contains a large chunk of Peters's old State Senate district and portions of his old congressional district. Indeed, Peters had represented most of the Oakland County portion of the district at one time or another. Due to Detroit's dwindling population, it was no longer possible to keep the district exclusively within Wayne County.

In the August 2012 Democratic primary, Peters defeated Clarke, who had opted to follow most of his constituents into the reconfigured 14th even though his home had been drawn into the reconfigured 13th (the old 14th), and Southfield Mayor Brenda Lawrence. The 14th was a heavily Democratic, 58% Black district, and Peters was overwhelmingly favored in November. As expected, he bested Republican John Hauler in the general election with 82% of the vote. He was the first white congressman to represent a significant portion of Detroit since 1993.

=== Tenure ===
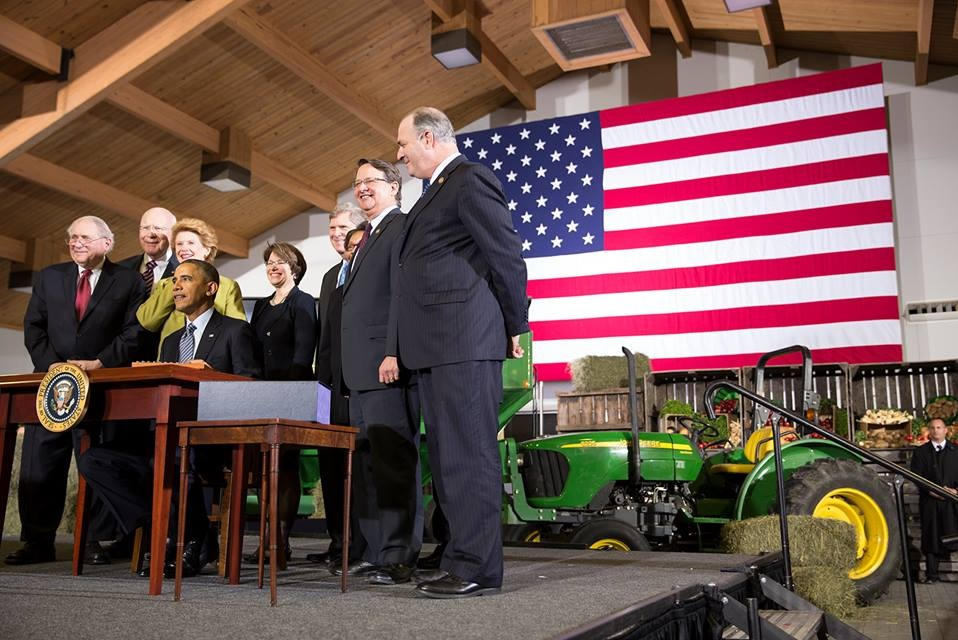
Peters at the signing of the Agricultural Act of 2014

Peters was sworn into his first term in January 2009. During his time in office, he voted for the Recovery Act, also known as the stimulus, the Patient Protection and Affordable Care Act, the American Clean Energy and Security Act, which would have established a national emissions trading plan, but was not passed by the full Congress, the Paycheck Fairness Act, also not passed into law, the Lilly Ledbetter Fair Pay Act, and the DREAM Act to provide conditional permanent residency to certain immigrants.

Peters worked with the Obama administration to obtain debt forgiveness for Chrysler. House Financial Services Committee Chairman Barney Frank said Peters was the "single most effective person" in fighting the forces that wanted to let Detroit go bankrupt. In Congress, Peters opposed a plan to provide disaster relief aid, the funds for which would have come from the Advanced Technology Vehicles Manufacturing (ATVM) loan program.

The Michigan Messenger wrote in 2010 that Peters was "criticizing the leadership of his own party. Peters and three other Democratic legislators ... this week formed the Spending Cuts and Deficit Reduction Working Group and proposed a series of bills to cut spending. Peters' bill makes cuts in the federal energy budget." "We have been growing increasingly frustrated with the lack of action and talking about specifics and putting those on the table", Peters said. "We've been frustrated with both Democratic leadership and Republicans."

Peters allied himself with the Occupy Wall Street movement, making an appearance at Occupy Detroit in November 2011. He told reporters: "It's speculation on Wall Street that we're still paying the price for here, particularly in Detroit, that almost brought the auto industry to a collapse because of what we saw on Wall Street. So we put in restrictions, or put in regulations necessary to rein that in, and right now in Washington I'm facing a Republican majority that wants to undo that."

Peters was one of 118 House Democrats who signed a letter to President Obama in 2011 urging him to support the United Nations Population Fund (UNFPA), a multinational organization that provides health services to women, children, and families in more than 150 countries. In 2014, he opposed a Michigan law that prohibits insurers from offering abortion coverage as a standard feature in health plans.

Peters was named senior whip for the Democratic caucus in 2013.

== U.S. Senate (2015–present) ==
=== Elections ===
==== 2014 ====
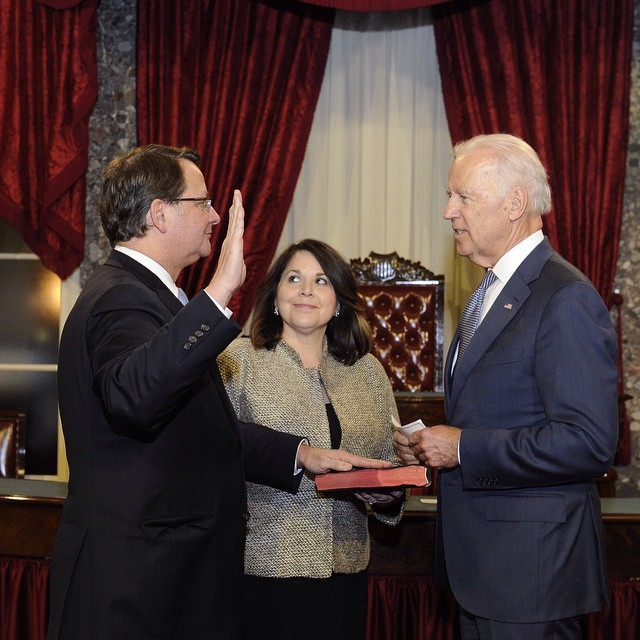
Peters being sworn into the Senate by Vice President Joe Biden, 2015

In 2014, Peters ran for the Senate seat being vacated by retiring Senator Carl Levin. Levin and Senator Debbie Stabenow endorsed Peters, and his entrance largely cleared the field of potential Democratic challengers.

Peters's largest independent supporter was the Senate Majority PAC, which spent almost $3.2 million for ads attacking the Republican nominee, Terri Lynn Land. In July 2014, Senator Elizabeth Warren supported Peters at a campaign fundraising event.

While the race was considered competitive early on, various missteps by Land's campaign and her reluctance to appear in public benefited Peters; he had consistent leads in polls late in the campaign.

==== 2020 ====
Peters faced Republican nominee John James in the November 2020 general election. James previously ran unsuccessfully for Senate in 2018 against Stabenow. Less than a month before the election, Peters became the first sitting U.S. senator ever to publicly reveal a personal family experience with abortion. He was reelected by a smaller margin (1.7%) than expected.

==== 2026 ====
In January 2025, Peters announced that he would not seek election to a third term in 2026: "I always thought there would be a time that I would step aside and pass the reins for the next generation. I also never saw service in Congress as something you do your whole life."

=== Tenure ===
Peters questions Defense Secretary Pete Hegseth on the 2026 Iran war on July 21, 2026

Peters was participating in the certification of the 2021 United States Electoral College vote count on January 6, 2021, when Trump supporters stormed the United States Capitol. Along with other senators and staff, Peters was evacuated from the Senate floor when rioters breached the Capitol. From a secured location, he tweeted that the attacks were "dangerous, unacceptable and an attack on our democracy—and must stop." Peters blamed Trump, calling him "a clear and present danger" and calling for his immediate removal from office by impeachment or the Twenty-fifth Amendment to the United States Constitution. Peters also called for investigations into the security and intelligence failure that resulted in the breaching of the Capitol and the five deaths. He led the investigation as chair of the Senate Homeland Security and Governmental Affairs Committee.

Peters and Senator John Kennedy co-sponsored the Ending Improper Payments to Deceased People Act, which required the Social Security Administration to share its Death Master File with the Treasury Department's Do Not Pay system to ensure dead Americans could not continue to receive aid from the federal government. The law helped stop $99 million in improper payments to dead people in 2025.

=== Committee assignments ===
- Committee on Appropriations
  - Subcommittee on Agriculture, Rural Development, Food and Drug Administration, and Related Agencies
  - Subcommittee on Commerce, Justice, Science, and Related Agencies
  - Subcommittee on Department of Homeland Security
  - Subcommittee on the Department of the Interior, Environment, and Related Agencies
  - Subcommittee on Military Construction, Veterans Affairs, and Related Agencies
- Committee on Armed Services
  - Subcommittee on Airland
  - Subcommittee on Emerging Threats and Capabilities (Chair)
- Committee on Commerce, Science, and Transportation
  - Subcommittee on Aviation and Space
  - Subcommittee on Communications, Technology, Innovation, and the Internet
  - Subcommittee on Science, Oceans, Fisheries and Weather
  - Subcommittee on Transportation and Safety
- Committee on Homeland Security and Governmental Affairs (Chair)
- Joint Economic Committee

=== Caucus memberships ===
- Congressional Motorcycle Caucus
- Rare Disease Caucus
- Senate Taiwan Caucus

== Political positions ==
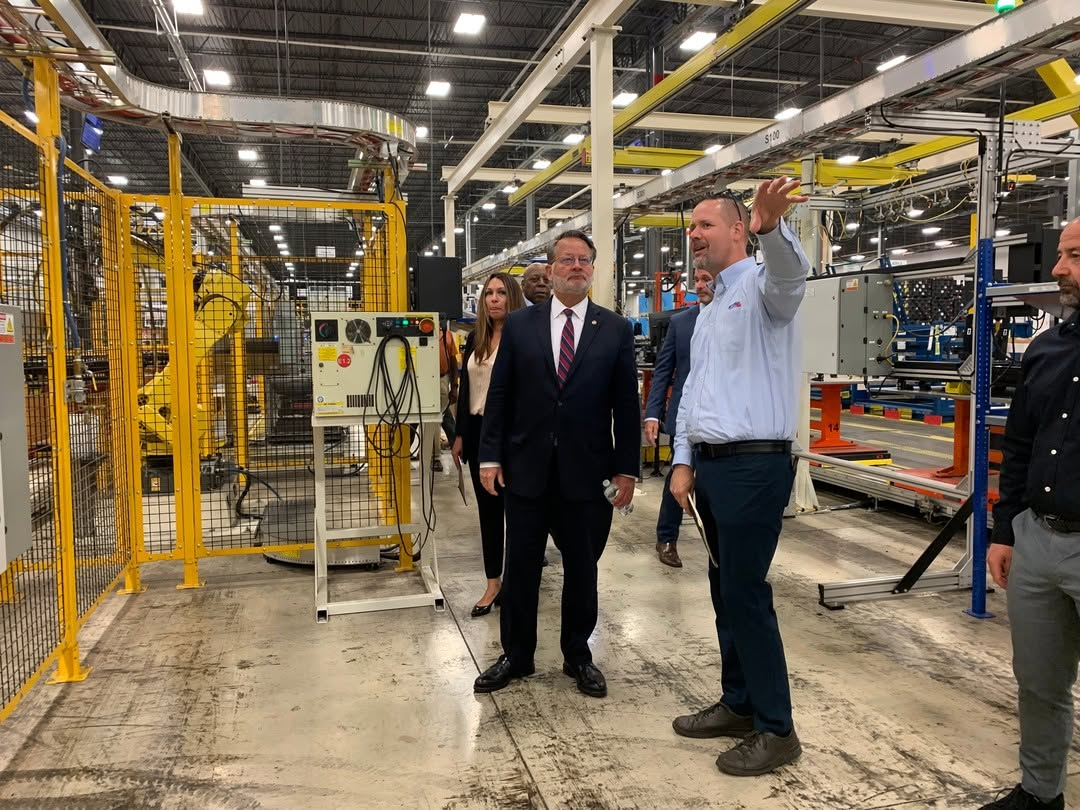
Peters visits Piston Automotive in Detroit, 2022

In the Bipartisan Index created by The Lugar Center and the McCourt School of Public Policy, Peters was ranked the 17th-most bipartisan U.S. senator (and the fourth-most bipartisan Democrat) during the 115th U.S. Congress (2017–2019). The nonpartisan Center for Effective Lawmaking ranked Peters the most effective senator in the 116th Congress (2019–2021), despite his being in the minority party. In 2023, the Lugar Center ranked Peters second among senators for bipartisanship.

=== Women's rights and abortion ===
Peters supported the Paycheck Fairness Act. In 2015, he voted for the International Violence Against Women Act. He supports abortion rights. In the late 1980s, his first wife had a wanted pregnancy that failed at four months, but her miscarriage did not proceed naturally, causing a health emergency. Their hospital did not perform abortions, but Peters's wife was able to get an emergency abortion at another hospital in part because she and Peters were friends with the hospital's administrator.

=== Foreign policy ===
==== China ====
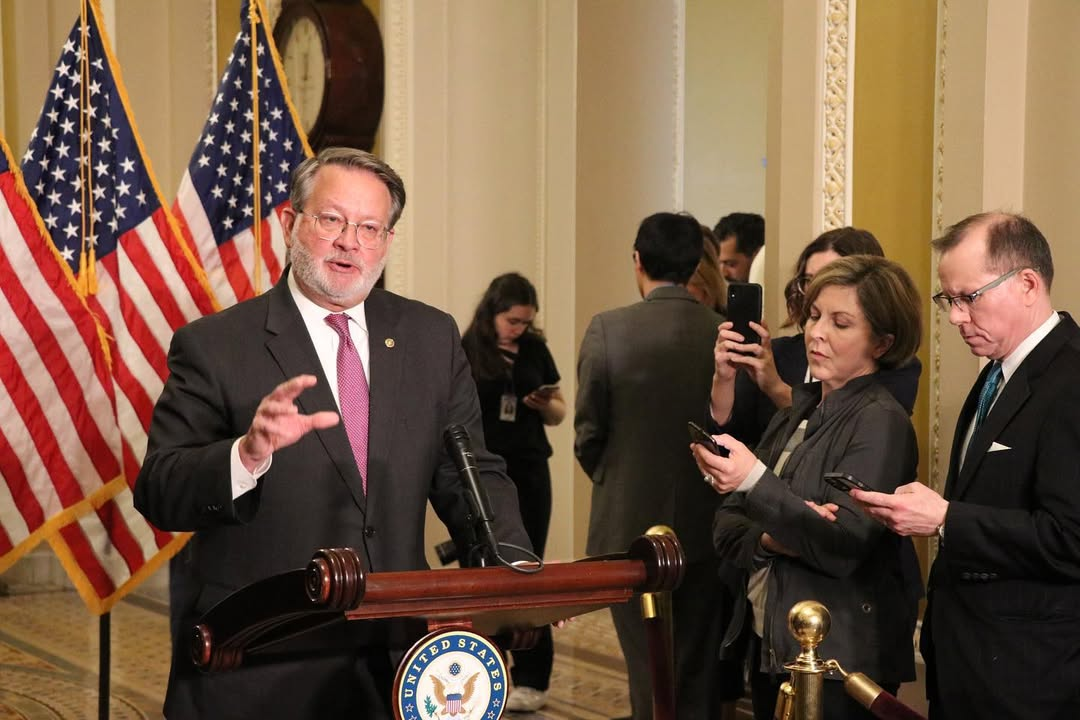
Peters discusses the need for measures that will allow the U.S. to outcompete China, 2023

In 2017, in response to China's efforts to purchase tech companies based in the U.S., Peters was one of nine senators to cosponsor a bill that would broaden the federal government's ability to prevent foreign purchases of U.S. firms by strengthening the Committee on Foreign Investment in the United States (CFIUS). The CFIUS's scope would be expanded to allow it to review and decline smaller investments and consider additional national security factors, including whether information about Americans would be exposed as part of transactions and whether a deal would facilitate fraud.

==== Israel-Palestine ====
In 2017, Peters cosponsored the Israel Anti-Boycott Act, which would make it a federal crime for government contractors to encourage or participate in boycotts against Israel and Israeli settlements in the occupied Palestinian territories if protesting actions by the Israeli government.

Peters continued to strongly support Israel during the Gaza war, sponsoring legislation in 2024 to provide $30 million to support Israeli anti-tunneling operations and for the technology to be shared with the United States for use at its borders. He also voted to defund U.S. support for UNRWA through 2025 after an Israeli campaign to discredit the agency, at the time the main organization responsible for coordinating humanitarian assistance in Gaza.

In 2025, Peters was in the minority of Senate Democrats that voted not to block the sale of arms to Israel despite rising death tolls from its war on Gaza and restrictions on humanitarian aid resulting in widespread famine. In April 2026, Peters joined most Senate Democrats in supporting a resolution to block a sale of bulldozers to Israel, but was one of 11 to oppose another resolution voted on the same day to block another sale to Israel of 1,000-pound bombs.

=== Guns ===
Peters is a gun owner. After the 2016 Orlando nightclub shooting, he supported the Chris Murphy gun control filibuster. In 2019, he was one of 40 senators to introduce the Background Check Expansion Act, a bill that would require background checks for the sale or transfer of all firearms. Exceptions to the bill's background check requirement included transfers between members of law enforcement, loaning firearms for hunting or sporting events on a temporary basis, providing them as gifts to members of one's immediate family, transferring them as part of an inheritance, or giving one to another person temporarily for immediate self-defense.

=== Health care ===
Peters voted for the Patient Protection and Affordable Care Act (Obamacare) in 2009. He has opposed attempts to repeal the law, and supported a Medicare public option to expand health care access.

=== Immigration ===
Peters voted against providing COVID-19 pandemic financial support to undocumented immigrants in 2021.

In 2025, Peters was one of 12 Senate Democrats who joined all Republicans to vote for the Laken Riley Act.

=== Whistleblower protections ===
On March 5, 2025, Peters introduced S. 874, the Expanding Whistleblower Protections for Contractors Act of 2025, which aims to strengthen protections for federal contractors who report waste, fraud, or abuse by ensuring they are shielded from retaliation by government officials.

== Personal life ==
Peters discusses his motorcycle tour of Michigan in 2024

Peters is married to Colleen Ochoa, who is from Waterford Township, Michigan. They have three children and live in Bloomfield Township, Michigan.

He is an Episcopalian and has said his religion is important to him and "gives me comfort in rough times".

Peters is an avid motorcyclist and has made a tradition of annual motorcycle tours of Michigan. He is a member of the Sons of the American Revolution. His ancestor William Garrett served in the Virginia Militia in the Revolutionary War alongside George Washington at Valley Forge during the harsh winter of 1777 to 1778.

He had a net worth between $1.7 million and $6.3 million at the end of 2014, which ranked him 37th in the Senate in terms of wealth.

== Electoral history ==
Party political offices
Preceded by Jennifer Granholm	Democratic nominee for Attorney General of Michigan; 2002	Succeeded by Amos Williams
Preceded by Carl Levin	Democratic nominee for U.S. Senator from Michigan (Class 2); 2014, 2020	Succeeded by Abdul El-Sayed
Preceded by Catherine Cortez Masto	Chair of the Democratic Senatorial Campaign Committee; 2021–2025	Succeeded by Kirsten Gillibrand
U.S. House of Representatives
Preceded by Joe Knollenberg	Member of the U.S. House of Representatives from Michigan's 9th congressional district 2009–2013	Succeeded by Sander Levin
Preceded by John Conyers	Member of the U.S. House of Representatives from Michigan's 14th congressional district 2013–2015	Succeeded by Brenda Lawrence
U.S. Senate
Preceded by Carl Levin	U.S. Senator (Class 2) from Michigan; 2015–present Served alongside: Debbie Stabenow, Elissa Slotkin	Incumbent
Preceded by Claire McCaskill	Ranking Member of the Senate Homeland Security Committee; 2019–2021	Succeeded by Rob Portman
Preceded by Ron Johnson	Chair of the Senate Homeland Security Committee; 2021–2025	Succeeded by Rand Paul
Preceded by Rand Paul	Ranking Member of the Senate Homeland Security Committee; 2025–present	Incumbent
U.S. order of precedence (ceremonial)
Preceded by Tom Cotton	Order of precedence of the United States as United States Senator	Succeeded by Joni Ernst
Preceded by Shelley Moore Capito	United States senators by seniority 47th	Succeeded by Bill Cassidy
