= 2006 Michigan Attorney General election =

- November 7, 2006
- Turnout: 3,690,415
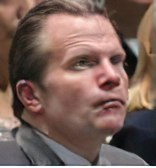

Nominee	Mike Cox	Amos Williams
Party	Republican	Democratic
Popular vote	1,986,606	1,605,725
Percentage	53.8%	43.5%
- Cox: 40–50% 50–60% 60–70% 70–80% 80–90% >90% Williams: 40–50% 50–60% 60–70% 70–80% 80–90% >90% Tie: 40–50% 50% No data
Attorney General before election
Mike Cox
Republican
Elected Attorney General
Mike Cox
Republican

The 2006 Michigan Attorney General election took place on November 7, 2006, to elect the Attorney General of Michigan. Incumbent Mike Cox became the first Republican in over 50 years to be elected attorney general and was seeking to become the first Republican since the amending of the Michigan Constitution to be re-elected. Despite a 2005 scandal where Cox announced he had an extramarital affair before becoming Attorney General Cox won re-election easily, defeating Democratic nominee Amos Williams, taking 54 percent of the vote.

== Republican convention ==
=== Candidates ===
==== Nominee ====
- Mike Cox, incumbent Michigan Attorney General

== Democratic convention ==
=== Candidates ===
==== Nominee ====
- Amos Williams

== Minor parties ==
=== Libertarian Party ===
- Bill Hall

=== U.S. Taxpayers Party ===
- Charles F. Conces

== General election ==
=== Results ===
2006 General Election - Michigan Attorney General
Party	Candidate	Votes	%	±%
Republican	Mike Cox (i)	1,986,606	53.8	+4.9
Democratic	Amos Williams	1,605,725	43.5	−5.2
Libertarian	Bill Hall	61,607	1.7	N/A
U.S. Taxpayers	Charles Conces	36,477	1.0	+0.1
Majority		380,881	10.3	+10.1
Turnout		3,690,415		+20.3
Republican hold				
