= 2020 United States Senate election in Michigan =

- November 3, 2020
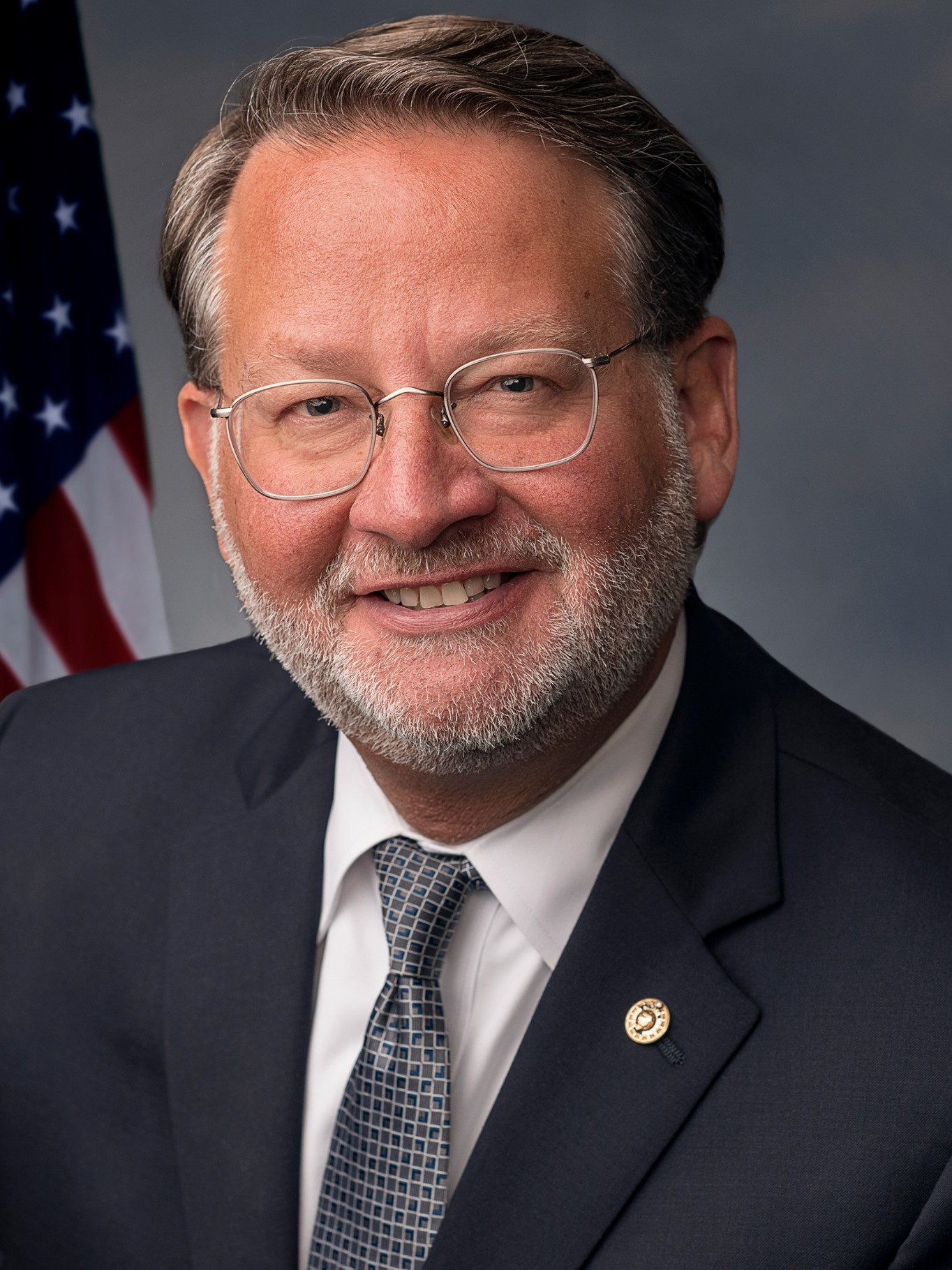

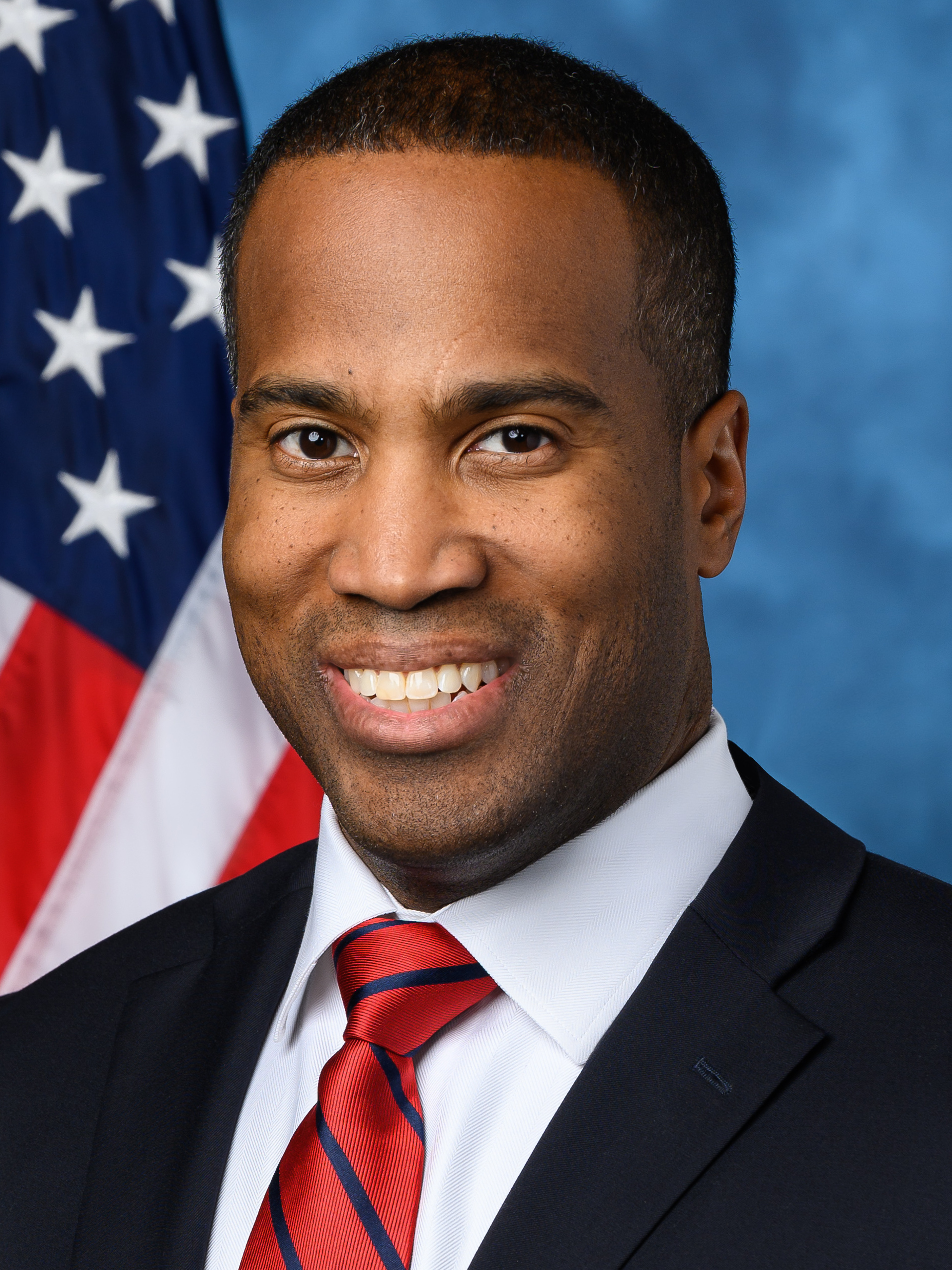
Nominee	Gary Peters	John James
Party	Democratic	Republican
Popular vote	2,734,568	2,642,233
Percentage	49.90%	48.22%
- Peters: 40–50% 50–60% 60–70% 70–80% 80–90% >90% James: 40–50% 50–60% 60–70% 70–80% 80–90% >90% Tie: 40–50% 50% No data
U.S. senator before election
Gary Peters
Democratic
Elected U.S. Senator
Gary Peters
Democratic

The 2020 United States Senate election in Michigan was held on November 3, 2020, to elect a member of the United States Senate to represent Michigan. It was held concurrently with the 2020 U.S. presidential election, as well as other elections to the United States Senate, elections to the United States House of Representatives, and various state and local elections. This was one of two Democratic-held U.S. Senate seats up for election in 2020 in a state Donald Trump won in 2016. The primary was held on August 4.

The filing deadline for candidates to run in the primary was April 21, but this was extended to May 8 due to the COVID-19 pandemic. The election was considered a potential upset pickup by the Republicans due to the state's demographic trends, Donald Trump's upset win in 2016, and Republican candidate John James exceeding expectations in the 2018 U.S. Senate race.

Incumbent Democrat Gary Peters won election to a second term, though by a much closer margin than expected. James, who outperformed his margin of defeat from 2018 and Trump on the same ballot, initially refused to concede, claiming in a statement published to his campaign website two days after the election that he had been "cheated" out of winning the election. The statement alleged that there were "deep concerns that millions of Michiganders may have been disenfranchised by a dishonest few who cheat." On November 24, three weeks after election day, James conceded the race. With a margin of 1.68%, this election was the second-closest race of the 2020 Senate election cycle, behind only the regularly-scheduled election in Georgia.

== Democratic primary ==
=== Candidates ===
==== Nominee ====
- Gary Peters, incumbent U.S. senator

==== Declined ====
- Abdul El-Sayed, former executive director of the Detroit Department of Health and Wellness Promotion and candidate for Governor of Michigan in 2018

=== Endorsements ===
Gary Peters

Organizations

- Clean Water Action
- Council for a Livable World
- End Citizens United
- Feminist Majority PAC
- Giffords
- Human Rights Campaign
- Humane Society of the United States Legislative Fund
- League of Conservation Voters
- Michigan Democratic Jewish Caucus
- Michigan Education Association
- Michigan Realtors
- NARAL Pro-Choice America
- National Organization for Women
- Peace Action
- Planned Parenthood Action Fund
- Population Connection
- Progressive Women's Alliance of West Michigan
- Sierra Club
- Voter Protection Project
- VoteVets

=== Democratic primary results ===
Democratic primary results
Party	Candidate	Votes	%
Democratic	Gary Peters (incumbent)	1,180,780	100.0%
Total votes		1,180,780	100.0%

== Republican primary ==
=== Candidates ===
==== Nominee ====
- John James, businessman, Iraq War veteran and nominee for the U.S. Senate in 2018

==== Disqualified ====
- Bob Carr, historic preservationist, businessman and perennial candidate
- Valerie Willis, write-in candidate in the 2018 United States Senate election in Michigan (switched to U.S. Taxpayers candidacy)

==== Declined ====
- Tom Leonard, former speaker of the Michigan House of Representatives and nominee for Michigan Attorney General in 2018
- Candice Miller, Macomb County Public Works commissioner and former U.S. representative for Michigan's 10th congressional district
- Sandy Pensler, businessman and candidate for U.S. Senate in 2018
- Bill Schuette, former Michigan attorney general, nominee for governor of Michigan in 2018 and nominee for the U.S. Senate in 1990 (endorsed John James)
- Rick Snyder, former governor of Michigan

=== Endorsements ===
John James

Individuals

- Ronna McDaniel, chair of the Republican National Committee

Organizations

- New York Young Republican Club

=== Polling ===
Poll source	Date(s) administered	Sample size (Note: Key: A – all adults RV – registered voters LV – likely voters V – unclear)	Margin of error	John James	Bill Schuette	Undecided
	June 6, 2019	Schuette announces that he will not run by endorsing James				
Target Insyght	April 22–25, 2019	296 (LV) (Note: Sample size estimated by multiplying the total sample size with the percentage of it that identifies as Republican)	–	59%	15%	26%

=== Results ===
Republican primary results
Party	Candidate	Votes	%
Republican	John James	1,005,315	100.0%
Total votes		1,005,315	100.0%

== Other candidates ==
=== Communist Party ===
==== Withdrawn ====
- Frank Seldon Cupps (as a write-in candidate)

=== Green Party ===
==== Nominee ====
- Marcia Squier (2018 Green Party nominee for US Senate)

=== Natural Law Party ===
==== Nominee ====
- Doug Dern

=== U.S. Taxpayers Party ===
==== Nominee ====
- Valerie L. Willis (switched from Republican candidacy after being disqualified for the Republican primary)

=== Independents ===
- Leonard Gadzinski

==== Withdrawn ====
- Gregory Charles Jones

== General election ==
=== Predictions ===
Source	Ranking	As of
The Cook Political Report	Lean D	October 29, 2020
Inside Elections	Lean D	October 28, 2020
Sabato's Crystal Ball	Lean D	November 2, 2020
Daily Kos	Lean D	October 30, 2020
Politico	Lean D	November 2, 2020
RCP	Tossup	October 23, 2020
DDHQ	Likely D	November 3, 2020
538	Likely D	November 2, 2020
Economist	Likely D	November 2, 2020

=== Additional general election endorsements ===
Gary Peters (D)

U.S. executive branch officials

- Joe Biden, 47th vice president of the United States (2009–2017), former U.S. Senator from Delaware (1973–2009) and 2020 Democratic nominee for President of the United States
- Barack Obama, 44th president of the United States (2009–2017) and former U.S. senator from Illinois (2005–2008)

U.S. senators

- Amy Klobuchar, U.S. senator from Minnesota (2007–present)
- Bernie Sanders, U.S. senator from Vermont (2007–present) and former U.S. representative from Vermont's at-large congressional district (1991–2007)
- Elizabeth Warren, U.S. senator from Massachusetts (2013–present)

Organizations

- Black Economic Alliance
- Center for Biological Diversity
- Congressional Black Caucus PAC
- Democratic Majority for Israel
- Everytown for Gun Safety
- Fems for Dems
- Joint Action Committee for Political Affairs
- National Association of Social Workers
- National Committee for an Effective Congress
- National Committee to Preserve Social Security and Medicare
- National Education Association
- Natural Resources Defense Council Action Fund
- Progressive Turnout Project

Newspapers

- Detroit Free Press

Labor unions

- American Federation of State, County and Municipal Employees Council 25
- American Federation of Teachers - Michigan
- International Brotherhood of Electrical Workers
- International Federation of Professional and Technical Engineers
- Michigan AFL–CIO
- Michigan Building and Construction Trades Council
- Michigan Laborers' District Council
- Michigan Nurses Association
- Michigan Regional Council of Carpenters
- Service Employees International Union Healthcare Michigan
- United Auto Workers
John James (R)

U.S. executive branch officials

- Nikki Haley, 29th United States Ambassador to the United Nations (2017–2018) and 116th governor of South Carolina (2011–2017)
- Mike Pence, 48th vice president of the United States (2017–2021)
- Donald Trump, 45th president of the United States (2017–2021)

U.S. representatives

- Dan Crenshaw, U.S. representative from Texas's 2nd congressional district (2019–present)

Newspapers

- The Alpena News
- The Daily Mining Gazette
- Daily Press
- The Detroit News
- Washington Examiner

Individuals

- Kirstie Alley, actress
- Donald Trump Jr., son of United States President Donald Trump

Organizations

- American Conservative Union
- Family Research Council Action
- FreedomWorks
- Huck PAC
- Michigan Chamber of Commerce
- Michigan Farm Bureau
- National Federation of Independent Business
- National Right to Life Committee
- NRA Political Victory Fund
- Senate Conservatives Fund
- Susan B. Anthony List
- United States Chamber of Commerce

=== Polling ===
==== Graphical summary ====
View source data.

==== Aggregate polls ====
John James vs. Gary Peters
Source of poll aggregation	Dates administered	Dates updated	Gary Peters	John James	Other/Undecided (Note: Calculated by taking the difference of 100% and all other candidates combined.)	Margin
270 To Win	November 2, 2020	November 3, 2020	49.8%	42.2%	8.0%	Peters +7.6
Real Clear Politics	November 1, 2020	November 3, 2020	49.8%	44.4%	5.8%	Peters +5.4

Poll source	Date(s) administered	Sample size	Margin of error	Gary Peters (D)	John James (R)	Other/ Undecided
Research Co.	October 31 – November 1, 2020	450 (LV)	± 4.6%	52%	37%	12% (Note: "Someone else" with 2%; Undecided with 10%)
Change Research/CNBC	October 29 – November 1, 2020	383 (LV)	± 5.01%	51%	46%	3% (Note: "Refused" with 1%; Did not vote and would not vote with 0%; Undecided with 2%)
Swayable	October 27 – November 1, 2020	393 (LV)	± 6.6%	54%	46%	–
Ipsos/Reuters	October 27 – November 1, 2020	654 (LV)	± 4.4%	51%	44%	5% (Note: "Some other candidate" with 3%; would not vote with 0%; Undecided with 2%)
Morning Consult	October 22–31, 2020	1,736 (LV)	± 2.0%	49%	43%	–
Emerson College	October 29–30, 2020	700 (LV)	± 3.4%	52% (Note: With voters who lean towards a given candidate)	46%	2% (Note: "Someone else" with 2%)
Public Policy Polling (D) (Note: Progress Michigan is a non-profit that primarily supports Democratic candidates)	October 29–30, 2020	745 (V)	± 3.6%	54%	44%	2% (Note: Squier (G) with 0%; Undecided with 2%)
Targoz Market Research/PollSmart	October 25–30, 2020	993 (LV)	–	54%	43%	2% (Note: "Not sure/Someone else/Undecided" with 2%)
CNN/SSRS	October 23–30, 2020	907 (LV)	± 3.8%	52%	40%	7% (Note: Squier (G) with 3%; "None of these" with 1%; "Other" with 0%; Undecided with 3%)
Mitchell Research (R)	October 29, 2020	817 (LV)	± 3.43%	50%	45%	5% (Note: "Other" with 3%; Undecided with 2%)
RMG Research	October 27–29, 2020	800 (LV)	± 3.5%	50% (Note: Standard VI response)	41%	9% (Note: "Other" with 3%; Undecided with 6%)
RMG Research	October 27–29, 2020	800 (LV)	± 3.5%	52% (Note: Results generated with high Democratic turnout model)	39%	9% (Note: "Other" with 3%; Undecided with 6%)
RMG Research	October 27–29, 2020	800 (LV)	± 3.5%	48% (Note: Results generated with high Republican turnout model)	42%	9% (Note: "Other" with 3%; Undecided with 6%)
EPIC-MRA	October 25–28, 2020	600 (LV)	± 4%	47%	42%	11% (Note: "Third party" with 5%; "Undecided/Refused" with 6%)
Kiaer Research	October 21–28, 2020	669 (LV)	± 5.6%	51%	38%	11% (Note: "Other/third party" with 2%; Undecided with 9%)
Mitchell Research (R)	October 25–27, 2020	759 (LV)	± 3.56%	52%	43%	3% (Note: Undecided with 3%)
Tarrance Group (R) (Note: Poll conducted for James' campaign.)	October 24–26, 2020 (Note: Additional details sourced from FiveThirtyEight)	– (V) (Note: Not yet released)	± 4.3%	48%	46%	1% (Note: Undecided with 1%)
Swayable	October 23–26, 2020	365 (LV)	± 6.9%	58%	42%	–
Siena College/NYT Upshot	October 23–26, 2020	856 (LV)	± 3.8%	49%	41%	8% (Note: Squier (G) and would not vote with 1%; Dern (Natural Law), "Someone else" and Willis (Taxpayers) with 0%; "Undecided/Refused" with 6%)
Ipsos/Reuters	October 20–26, 2020	652 (LV)	± 4.4%	50%	44%	6% (Note: "Some other candidate" with 4%; would not vote with 0%; "Undecided/Refused" with 2%)
Glengariff Group	October 23–25, 2020	600 (LV)	± 4%	48%	39%	9% (Note: Undecided with 9%)
ABC/Washington Post	October 20–25, 2020	789 (LV)	± 4%	52%	46%	2% (Note: "Other" with 1%; "None of these" with 0%; would not vote with no voters; Undecided with 1%)
Gravis Marketing	October 24, 2020	679 (LV)	± 3.8%	52%	41%	7% (Note: Undecided with 7%)
Public Policy Polling (D) (Note: Poll sponsored by The American Bridge PAC, which exclusively supports Democratic candidates.)	October 21–22, 2020	804 (V)	–	52%	43%	6% (Note: Undecided with 6%)
Citizen Data	October 17–20, 2020	1,000 (LV)	± 3.1%	46%	42%	12% (Note: "Other" with 1%; Undecided with 11%)
FOX News	October 17–20, 2020	1,032 (LV)	± 3%	49%	41%	9% (Note: "Other" with 3%; would not vote with 1%; Undecided with 5%)
Reuters/Ipsos	October 14–20, 2020	686 (LV)	± 4.3%	50%	45%	5% (Note: "Some other candidate" with 3%; would not vote with 0%; "Undecided/Refused" with 2%)
Morning Consult	October 11–20, 2020	1,717 (LV)	± 2.4%	48%	42%	–
Change Research/CNBC	October 16–19, 2020	718 (LV) (Note: Additional data sourced from FiveThirtyEight)	–	50%	45%	–
EPIC-MRA	October 15–19, 2020	600 (LV)	± 4%	45%	39%	16% (Note: "Third party candidate" with 5%; "Undecided/Refused" with 11%)
Mitchell Research (R)	October 18, 2020	900 (LV)	± 3.27%	49%	43%	8% (Note: Undecided with 8%)
Trafalgar Group (R) (Note: Poll sponsored by Restoration PAC, a conservative super PAC supporting James.)	October 15–18, 2020	1,034 (LV)	± 2.97%	48%	50%	3% (Note: "Someone else" and Undecided with 1%)
Data For Progress	October 15–18, 2020	830 (LV)	± 3.4%	48%	43%	9% (Note: Undecided with 9%)
HarrisX/The Hill	October 12–15, 2020	1,289 (LV)	–	50% (Note: Additional data sourced from FiveThirtyEight)	43%	–
Trafalgar Group (R)	October 11–15, 2020	1,018 (LV)	± 2.99%	47%	48%	5% (Note: "Someone else" and Undecided with 3%)
Reuters/Ipsos	October 7–13, 2020	620 (LV)	± 4.5%	52%	44%	4% (Note: "Some other candidate" with 2%; would not vote with 0%; "Undecided/Refused" with 2%)
EPIC-MRA	October 8–12, 2020	600 (LV)	± 4%	45%	39%	16% (Note: "Third party candidate" with 5%; "Undecided/Refused" with 11%)
Siena College/NYT Upshot	October 6–11, 2020	614 (LV)	± 4.6%	43%	42%	15% (Note: Squier (G) and would not vote with 1%; Dern (Natural Law), "someone else" and Willis (Taxpayers Party) with 0%; "Undecided/Refused" with 13%)
Morning Consult	October 2–11, 2020	1,710 (LV)	± 2.4%	49%	40%	–
YouGov/CBS	October 6–9, 2020	1,181 (LV)	± 3.3%	47%	44%	9% (Note: "Someone else" with 1%; Undecided with 8%)
Baldwin Wallace University	September 30 – October 8, 2020	1,134 (LV)	± 3.2%	48%	42%	10% (Note: Undecided with 10%)
Emerson College	October 6–7, 2020	716 (LV)	± 3.6%	51%	41%	8% (Note: "Someone else" with 2%; Undecided with 6%)
Opinion Insight/American Action Forum (Note: The American Action Forum is a 501 organization which usually supports Republican candidates)	October 3–6, 2020	800 (LV)	± 3.46%	49% (Note: With voters who lean towards a given candidate)	42%	8% (Note: Did/would not vote with 1%; Undecided with 6%)
Reuters/Ipsos	September 29 – October 6, 2020	709 (LV)	± 4.2%	50%	43%	7% (Note: "Some other candidate" with 3%; would not vote with 1%; "Undecided/Refused" with 3%)
Tarrance Group (R)	October 3–5, 2020	605 (RV)	± 4.1%	48%	46%	–
Change Research/CNBC	October 2–4, 2020	676 (LV)	–	51%	43%	6% (Note: "Do not recall" with 1%; "Did not vote" and would not vote with 0%; Undecided with 5%)
Glengariff Group	September 30 – October 3, 2020	600 (LV)	± 4%	45%	40%	16% (Note: "Refused" with 2%; "Third Party" with 1%; Undecided with 13%)
Public Policy Polling (D) (Note: Poll conducted for Progress Michigan, a non-profit that primarily supports Democratic candidates.)	September 30 – October 1, 2020	746 (V)	–	48%	41%	10% (Note: Squier (G) with 3%; Undecided with 7%)
Trafalgar Group (R)	September 26–28, 2020	1,042 (LV)	± 2.95%	48%	47%	5% (Note: "Another Party Candidate" with 2%; Undecided with 4%)
Trafalgar Group (R)	September 23–25, 2020	1,047 (LV)	± 2.95%	47%	47%	6% (Note: "Another Party Candidate" with 2%; Undecided with 4%)
Marist College/NBC	September 19–23, 2020	799 (LV)	± 4.3%	49%	44%	7% (Note: "Other" with 1%; Undecided with 6%)
Baldwin Wallace University	September 9–22, 2020	1,001 (LV)	± 3.6%	46%	41%	13%
Change Research/CNBC	September 18–20, 2020	568 (LV)	–	50%	44%	5% (Note: Would not vote with 2%; Undecided with 3%)
Morning Consult	September 11–20, 2020	1,376 (LV)	± (2% – 7%)	47% (Note: Overlapping sample with the previous Morning Consult poll, but more information available regarding sample size)	40%	–
Hart Research Associates (D) (Note: Poll sponsored by the Human Rights Campaign which has endorsed Biden prior to this poll's sampling period.)	September 17–19, 2020	400 (LV)	± 4.9%	50%	42%	–
Data for Progress (D)	September 14–19, 2020	455 (LV)	± 4.6%	47%	42%	12% (Note: Undecided with 12%)
Marketing Resource Group (R)	September 14–19, 2020	600 (LV)	± 4.0%	42%	40%	20% (Note: "Someone else" with 8%; "Refused" and would not vote with 1%; Undecided with 10%)
Morning Consult	September 8–17, 2020	1,451 (LV) (Note: Additional data sourced from FiveThirtyEight)	± (2% – 4%)	48%	40%	–
Ipsos/Reuters	September 11–16, 2020	637 (LV)	± 4.4%	49%	43%	7% (Note: "Some other candidate" with 1%; would not vote with 0%; Undecided with 6%)
EPIC-MRA	September 10–15, 2020	600 (LV)	± 4%	45%	41%	14% (Note: "Third party candidate" with 5%; "Undecided/Refused" with 9%)
Redfield & Wilton Strategies	September 12–14, 2020	930 (LV)	± 3.21%	51%	35%	13% (Note: "Another Third Party/Write-in" with 2%; Undecided with 11%)
Benenson Strategy Group/GS Strategy Group (Note: Poll sponsored by AARP.)	August 28 – September 8, 2020	1,600 (LV)	± 2.5%	45%	41%	14% (Note: Squier (G) with 2%; Willis (Taxpayers Party) with 1%; Dern (Natural Law) and "someone else" with 0%; Undecided with 11%)
Change Research/CNBC	September 4–6, 2020	876 (LV)	± 3.2%	50%	46%	5% (Note: Would not vote with 1%; Undecided with 4%)
Rasmussen Reports	September 2–3, 2020	1,000 (LV)	± 3.0%	48%	40%	13% (Note: "Some other candidate" with 3%; Undecided with 10%)
Glengariff Group/Detroit News	September 1–3, 2020	600 (LV)	± 4.0%	44%	41%	14% (Note: Undecided with 14%)
Tarrance Group (R)	September 1–3, 2020	569 (RV)	–	47%	46%	7% (Note: "Other candidates" with 3%; Undecided with 4%)
Redfield & Wilton Strategies	August 30 – September 3, 2020	967 (LV)	± 3.2%	50%	38%	12% (Note: "Another Third Party/Write-in" with 1%; Undecided with 11%)
Opinion Insight/American Action Forum	August 30 – September 2, 2020	802 (LV)	± 3.46%	49% (Note: With voters who lean towards a given candidate)	42%	8% (Note: Would not vote with 1%; Undecided with 7%)
Public Policy Polling (D)	August 28–29, 2020	897 (V)	± 3.2%	47%	39%	14% (Note: Squier (G) with 4%; Undecided with 10%)
Change Research/CNBC	August 21–23, 2020	809 (LV)	± 3.4%	50%	45%	6% (Note: Would not vote with 1%; Undecided with 5%)
Trafalgar Group (R)	August 14–23, 2020	1,048 (LV)	± 3.0%	47%	48%	5% (Note: "Another party candidate" with 2%; Undecided with 3%)
Redfield & Wilton Strategies	August 16–18, 2020	812 (LV)	± 3.4%	48%	39%	13% (Note: "Third party/write-in" with 1%; Undecided with 12%)
Hodas & Associates (R)	August 11–15, 2020	600 (LV)	–	53%	39%	8% (Note: Undecided with 8%)
Tarrance Group (R)	August 10–13, 2020	602 (RV)	± 4.1%	49%	44%	7%
Change Research/CNBC	August 7–9, 2020	413 (LV)	± 4.6%	48%	45%	7% (Note: Would not vote with 2%; Undecided with 5%)
EPIC-MRA	July 25–30, 2020	600 (LV)	± 4.0%	50%	40%	10% (Note: "Undecided/refused" with 10%)
Public Policy Polling (D)	July 28–29, 2020	876 (V)	± 3.2%	47%	39%	13% (Note: "Third party" with 4%; Undecided with 9%)
Change Research/CNBC	July 24–26, 2020	413 (LV)	± 4.8%	48%	44%	8%
Morning Consult	July 17–26, 2020	1,320 (LV)	± 3.0%	49%	35%	16%
CNN/SSRS	July 18–24, 2020	927 (RV)	± 3.8%	54%	38%	8% (Note: "None of the above/neither" with 2%; "Other" with 0%; Undecided with 6%)
Redfield & Wilton Strategies	July 19–23, 2020	811 (LV)	± 3.2%	52%	35%	13% (Note: "Third party/write-in" with 2%; Undecided with 11%)
Gravis Marketing	July 22, 2020	754 (LV)	± 3.6%	49%	39%	11% (Note: Undecided with 11%)
Marketing Resource Group (R)	July 19–21, 2020	600 (LV)	± 4.0%	41%	34%	26% (Note: "Someone else" with 14%; "refused" and would not vote with 0%; Undecided with 12%)
Beacon Research (D)/ Shaw & Co. Research (R) (Note: Poll conducted for Fox News.)	July 18–20, 2020	756 (RV)	± 3.5%	48%	38%	15% (Note: "Other" with 3%; would not vote with 2%; Undecided with 10%)
Hodas & Associates (R)	July 13–16, 2020	600 (LV)	± 4.0%	51%	40%	9% (Note: Undecided with 9%)
Spry Strategies (R) (Note: This poll's sponsor is the American Principles Project.)	July 11–16, 2020	600 (LV)	± 3.7%	47%	37%	15% (Note: "Another candidate" with 7%; Undecided with 8%)
Change Research (D) (Note: Poll conducted for CNBC.)	July 10–12, 2020	824 (LV)	± 2.8%	50%	43%	6% (Note: Undecided with 5%; would not vote with 1%)
Public Policy Polling (D) (Note: Poll sponsored by Giffords, which had endorsed Peters prior to the sampling period.)	July 9–10, 2020	1,041 (V)	± 3.2%	49%	42%	9%
Change Research (D)	June 26–28, 2020	699 (LV) (Note: Additional data sourced from FiveThirtyEight)	± 3.9%	49%	42%	9% (Note: Undecided with 7%; "would not vote" with 2%)
Public Policy Polling (D)	June 26–27, 2020	1,237 (V)	± 3.2%	47%	39%	14% (Note: Undecided with 10%; "would not vote" with 4%)
Hodas & Associates (R)	June 17–20, 2020	600 (LV)	± 4.0%	51%	38%	12% (Note: Undecided with 12%)
Siena College (Note: Poll sponsored by The New York Times.)	June 8–17, 2020	610 (RV)	± 4.3%	41%	31%	29% (Note: Undecided with 24%; would not vote with 4%; "Another candidate" with 1%)
Redfield & Wilton Strategies	June 14–16, 2020	826 (LV)	± 3.4%	50%	32%	18% (Note: Undecided with 15%; "Third party/write-in" with 3%)
Marketing Resource Group (R)	June 12–15, 2020	600 (LV)	± 4.0%	36%	30%	33% (Note: Undecided with 18.2%; "Someone else" with 13.7%; Would not vote with 1.5%)
TIPP Insights (R) (Note: Poll sponsored by American Greatness.)	June 9–12, 2020	907 (RV)	± 3.3%	47%	35%	17% (Note: Not sure with 13%; "Other" with 4%; "prefer not to answer" with 0%)
Kiaer Research	May 31 – June 7, 2020	543 (LV)	± 6.4%	48%	32%	20% (Note: Undecided with 17%; "A different candidate" with 3%)
EPIC-MRA	May 30 – June 3, 2020	600 (LV)	± 4.0%	51%	36%	13% (Note: Includes "refused")
Public Policy Polling (D)	May 29–30, 2020	1,582 (V)	± 2.5%	48%	39%	13% (Note: "Third party" with 3%; Undecided with 10%)
Change Research (D) (Note: Poll sponsored by Crooked Media.)	May 11–17, 2020	3,070 (LV)	± 2.6%	48%	43%	9%
Hodas & Associates (R)	May 1–5, 2020	600 (LV)	± 3.0%	48%	36%	17% (Note: Undecided with 17%)
Public Policy Polling (D)	April 28–29, 2020	1,270 (V)	± 3.2%	46%	37%	17%
Beacon Research (D)/ Shaw & Co. Research (R)	April 18–21, 2020	801 (RV)	± 3.5%	46%	36%	13%
Hodas & Associates (R)	April 9–18, 2020	600 (LV)	± 3.0%	46%	37%	17%
Public Policy Polling (D)	March 31 – April 1, 2020	1,019 (V)	± 3.1%	45%	38%	17%
Spry Strategies (R)	March 30 – April 1, 2020	602 (LV)	± 4.0%	42%	40%	18%
Hodas & Associates (R)	March 12–21, 2020	600 (LV)	± 4.0%	48%	39%	13%
Marketing Resource Group (R)	March 16–20, 2020	600 (LV)	± 4.0%	42%	35%	17% (Note: "Someone else" with 2%; "Refused" and would not vote with 1%; Undecided with 13%)
Firehouse Strategies/0ptimus	March 5–7, 2020	550 (LV)	± 5.0%	40%	41%	11%
Quinnipiac University	February 12–18, 2020	845 (RV)	± 3.4%	45%	39%	15%
Baldwin Wallace University	January 8–20, 2020	1,023 (RV)	± 3.1%	42%	32%	26%
Glengariff Group	January 3–7, 2020	600 (LV)	± 4.0%	44%	40%	16%
Emerson College	October 31 – November 3, 2019	1,051 (RV)	± 3.5%	46%	40%	14%
Hodas & Associates (R)	October 10–16, 2019 (Note: Additional data sourced from FiveThirtyEight)	600 (LV)	± 3.0%	48%	35%	17%
Marketing Resource Group (R)	October 7–10, 2019	600 (LV)	± 4.0%	43%	40%	17%
Target-InsyghtP (Note: Poll sponsored by MIRS News.)	September 24–26, 2019	804 (LV)	± 3.5%	53%	37%	10%
Denno Research (D)	September 21–24, 2019	600 (LV)	± 4.0%	40%	39%	21%
Target-Insyght	April 22–25, 2019	800 (LV)	± 3.5%	50%	36%	14%
Emerson College	March 7–10, 2019	743 (LV)	± 3.5%	44%	43%	14%

Hypothetical polling

The following poll assumes neither Republican candidate would withdraw after their primary. with Bob Carr and John James

Poll source	Date(s) administered	Sample size	Margin of error	Gary Peters (D)	Bob Carr (R)	John James (R)	Undecided
Baldwin Wallace University Great Lakes	March 17–25, 2020	822 (RV)	± 3.8%	40%	6% (Note: The survey indicates the candidate is called 'Bob Barr', but this is assumed to be an error.)	27%	28%

with Bill Schuette

Poll source	Date(s) administered	Sample size	Margin of error	Gary Peters (D)	Bill Schuette (R)	Undecided
Target Insyght	April 22–25, 2019	800 (LV)	± 3.5%	51%	32%	17%

with Gary Peters and Generic Republican

Poll source	Date(s) administered	Sample size	Margin of error	Gary Peters (D)	Generic Republican	Undecided
Denno Research/Vanguard PA (D)	May 8–10, 2019	600 (LV)	± 4.0%	42%	36%	21%

with Gary Peters and Generic Opponent

Poll source	Date(s) administered	Sample size	Margin of error	Gary Peters (D)	Generic Opponent	Undecided
MRG	Jun 12–15, 2020	600 (LV)	± 4.0%	19.2%	30.3% (Note: "It is time for someone new" with 30.3% as opposed to "Peters deserves to be re-elected")	50.5%

with Generic Democrat and Generic Republican

Poll source	Date(s) administered	Sample size	Margin of error	Generic Democrat	Generic Republican	Other	Undecided
Glengariff Group (Note: Poll sponsored by The Detroit News.)	October 23–25, 2020	600 (LV)	± 4%	47%	41%	–	–
Ipsos/Reuters	September 11–16, 2020	637 (LV)	± 4.4%	47%	43%	2% (Note: "Candidate from another party" with 2%)	8% (Note: "Prefer not to answer/refused" with 7%; "will not vote/not sure" with 1%)
Hodas & Associates (R)	August 11–15, 2020	600 (LV)	–	48%	39%	–	13%
Hodas & Associates (R)	July 13–16, 2020	600 (LV)	± 4.0%	49%	38%	–	13%
Hodas & Associates (R)	June 17–20, 2020	600 (LV)	± 4.0%	50%	34%	–	15%
Hodas & Associates (R)	May 1–5, 2020	600 (LV)	± 3.0%	43%	38%	15% (Note: "Independent/Undecided" with 15%)	–
Hodas & Associates (R)	April 9–18, 2020	600 (LV)	± 3.0%	40%	44%	16% (Note: "Independent/Undecided" with 16%)	–
Hodas & Associates (R)	March 12–21, 2020	600 (LV)	± 4.0%	46%	42%	12% (Note: "Independent/Undecided" with 12%)	–

=== Results ===
2020 United States Senate election in Michigan
Party	Candidate	Votes	%	±%
Democratic	Gary Peters (incumbent)	2,734,568	49.90%	−4.71%
Republican	John James	2,642,233	48.22%	+6.89%
U.S. Taxpayers'	Valerie Willis	50,597	0.92%	−0.28%
Green	Marcia Squier	39,217	0.72%	−0.12%
Natural Law	Doug Dern	13,093	0.24%	N/A
Write-in		12	0.00%	±0.00%
Total votes		5,479,720	100.0%	
Democratic hold				

==== By county ====
By county

County	Gary Peters Democratic		John James Republican		Valerie Willis Constitution		Marcia Squier Green		Doug Dern Natural Law		Write-in		Margin		Total votes
County	#	%	#	%	#	%	#	%	#	%	#	%	#	%	Total votes
Alcona	2,284	32.64	4,614	65.94	50	0.72	34	0.49	15	0.21	0	0.00	-2,330	-33.30	6,997
Alger	2,089	41.11	2,919	57.44	36	0.71	31	0.61	7	0.14	0	0.00	-830	-16.33	5,082
Allegan	22,939	34.52	42,362	63.76	594	0.89	416	0.63	132	0.20	2	0.00	-19,423	-29.23	66,445
Alpena	6,273	37.40	10,257	61.16	119	0.71	82	0.49	40	0.24	0	0.00	-3,984	-23.76	16,771
Antrim	5,758	36.27	9,924	62.51	82	0.52	86	0.54	27	0.17	0	0.00	-4,166	-26.24	15,877
Arenac	3,085	35.41	5,443	62.48	103	1.18	48	0.55	33	0.38	0	0.00	-2,358	-27.07	8,712
Baraga	1,528	38.20	2,409	60.22	31	0.77	23	0.58	9	0.23	0	0.00	-881	-22.02	4,000
Barry	11,369	31.96	23,499	66.06	366	1.03	241	0.68	95	0.27	0	0.00	-12,130	-34.10	35,570
Bay	27,072	45.52	31,314	52.65	561	0.94	382	0.64	143	0.24	0	0.00	-4,242	-7.13	59,472
Benzie	5,328	43.78	6,692	54.99	58	0.48	66	0.54	25	0.21	0	0.00	-1,364	-11.21	12,169
Berrien	34,777	42.87	44,801	55.23	764	0.94	568	0.70	209	0.26	0	0.00	-10,024	-12.36	81,119
Branch	6,119	30.17	13,682	67.47	278	1.37	132	0.65	69	0.34	0	0.00	-7,563	-37.29	20,280
Calhoun	28,145	42.93	35,786	54.59	867	1.32	547	0.83	211	0.32	0	0.00	-7,641	-11.66	65,556
Cass	8,565	33.13	16,814	65.04	253	0.98	161	0.62	58	0.22	0	0.00	-8,249	-31.91	25,851
Charlevoix	6,664	39.46	10,030	59.39	83	0.49	82	0.49	29	0.17	0	0.00	-3,366	-19.93	16,888
Cheboygan	5,475	34.80	10,026	63.72	121	0.77	82	0.52	30	0.19	0	0.00	-4,551	-28.92	15,734
Chippewa	6,729	38.48	10,497	60.02	128	0.73	102	0.58	33	0.19	0	0.00	-3,768	-21.54	17,489
Clare	5,372	33.35	10,468	64.99	125	0.78	96	0.60	47	0.29	0	0.00	-5,096	-31.64	16,108
Clinton	21,490	45.32	25,269	53.29	304	0.64	266	0.56	86	0.18	0	0.00	-3,779	-7.97	47,415
Crawford	2,653	34.10	5,021	64.54	52	0.67	34	0.44	20	0.26	0	0.00	-2,368	-30.44	7,780
Delta	7,827	37.42	12,828	61.33	126	0.60	97	0.46	39	0.19	0	0.00	-5,001	-23.91	20,917
Dickinson	4,881	33.69	9,431	65.10	88	0.61	65	0.45	21	0.15	0	0.00	-4,550	-31.41	14,486
Eaton	31,460	49.47	30,876	48.56	642	1.01	451	0.71	158	0.25	0	0.00	584	0.92	63,587
Emmet	9,216	41.85	12,506	56.79	97	0.44	152	0.69	51	0.23	0	0.00	-3,290	-14.94	22,022
Genesee	120,380	54.94	94,505	43.13	2,210	1.01	1,509	0.69	506	0.23	0	0.00	25,875	11.81	219,110
Gladwin	4,905	34.15	9,245	64.36	119	0.83	59	0.41	36	0.25	0	0.00	-4,340	-30.21	14,364
Gogebic	3,556	43.73	4,436	54.55	64	0.79	58	0.71	18	0.22	0	0.00	-880	-10.82	8,132
Grand Traverse	27,291	45.61	31,792	53.13	269	0.45	397	0.66	91	0.15	0	0.00	-4,501	-7.52	59,840
Gratiot	6,856	36.18	11,746	61.99	165	0.87	126	0.66	55	0.29	0	0.00	-4,890	-25.81	18,948
Hillsdale	6,237	27.19	16,227	70.73	251	1.09	154	0.67	73	0.32	0	0.00	-9,990	-43.54	22,942
Houghton	7,941	43.28	10,151	55.32	89	0.49	142	0.77	27	0.15	0	0.00	-2,210	-12.04	18,350
Huron	6,021	33.49	11,730	65.25	115	0.64	65	0.36	45	0.25	0	0.00	-5,709	-31.76	17,976
Ingham	92,378	64.35	48,378	33.70	1,260	0.88	1,218	0.85	323	0.22	0	0.00	44,000	30.65	143,557
Ionia	10,639	33.50	20,361	64.10	436	1.37	239	0.75	87	0.27	0	0.00	-9,722	-30.61	31,762
Iosco	5,804	38.35	9,040	59.73	153	1.01	95	0.63	43	0.28	0	0.00	-3,236	-21.38	15,135
Iron	2,554	38.01	4,063	60.47	51	0.76	39	0.58	12	0.18	0	0.00	-1,509	-22.46	6,719
Isabella	13,849	47.62	14,673	50.45	243	0.84	233	0.80	87	0.30	0	0.00	-824	-2.83	29,085
Jackson	32,649	40.97	45,054	56.54	1,096	1.38	620	0.78	262	0.33	0	0.00	-12,405	-15.57	79,681
Kalamazoo	78,842	55.44	60,227	42.35	1,371	0.96	1,456	1.02	318	0.22	1	0.00	18,615	13.09	142,215
Kalkaska	3,013	28.66	7,328	69.70	75	0.71	70	0.67	27	0.26	0	0.00	-4,315	-41.04	10,513
Kent	175,256	48.86	176,795	49.29	2,948	0.82	2,956	0.82	722	0.20	0	0.00	-1,539	-0.43	358,677
Keweenaw	686	44.69	837	54.53	1	0.07	8	0.52	3	0.19	0	0.00	-151	-9.84	1,535
Lake	2,286	36.73	3,804	61.12	85	1.37	28	0.45	21	0.34	0	0.00	-1,518	-24.39	6,224
Lapeer	16,590	31.94	34,340	66.12	581	1.12	283	0.54	143	0.28	0	0.00	-17,750	-34.18	51,937
Leelanau	8,277	49.17	8,380	49.78	61	0.36	100	0.59	17	0.10	0	0.00	-103	-0.61	16,835
Lenawee	19,767	37.64	31,659	60.28	539	1.03	413	0.79	139	0.26	0	0.00	-11,892	-22.64	52,517
Livingston	46,118	36.68	77,802	61.89	845	0.67	702	0.56	250	0.20	0	0.00	-31,684	-25.20	125,717
Luce	855	28.74	2,070	69.58	23	0.77	16	0.54	11	0.37	0	0.00	-1,215	-40.84	2,975
Mackinac	2,638	37.77	4,263	61.03	43	0.62	33	0.47	8	0.11	0	0.00	-1,625	-23.26	6,985
Macomb	224,448	46.14	252,052	51.81	5,111	1.05	3,532	0.73	1,334	0.27	5	0.00	-27,604	-5.67	486,482
Manistee	5,995	41.17	8,356	57.38	101	0.69	81	0.56	30	0.21	0	0.00	-2,361	-16.21	14,563
Marquette	20,408	54.89	16,247	43.70	179	0.48	302	0.81	42	0.11	0	0.00	4,161	11.19	37,178
Mason	6,660	38.82	10,238	59.67	114	0.66	111	0.65	35	0.20	0	0.00	-3,578	-20.85	17,158
Mecosta	7,228	34.66	13,275	63.65	167	0.80	143	0.69	43	0.21	0	0.00	-6,047	-28.99	20,856
Menominee	4,230	34.49	7,795	63.56	128	1.04	76	0.62	35	0.29	0	0.00	-3,565	-29.07	12,264
Midland	19,927	40.96	28,057	57.67	323	0.66	240	0.49	102	0.21	0	0.00	-8,130	-16.71	48,649
Missaukee	1,999	22.96	6,598	75.78	45	0.52	49	0.56	16	0.18	0	0.00	-4,599	-52.82	8,707
Monroe	32,721	38.39	50,580	59.34	1,009	1.18	638	0.75	284	0.33	0	0.00	-17,859	-20.95	85,232
Montcalm	9,714	30.71	21,146	66.86	430	1.36	211	0.67	127	0.40	0	0.00	-11,432	-36.15	31,628
Montmorency	1,717	29.58	4,029	69.41	32	0.55	14	0.24	13	0.22	0	0.00	-2,312	-39.83	5,805
Muskegon	44,192	48.53	44,637	49.02	1,157	1.27	810	0.89	257	0.28	0	0.00	-445	-0.49	91,053
Newaygo	7,696	28.61	18,593	69.13	332	1.23	174	0.65	101	0.38	0	0.00	-10,897	-40.51	26,896
Oakland	418,312	54.78	334,629	43.82	4,694	0.61	4,746	0.62	1,212	0.16	1	0.00	83,683	10.96	763,594
Oceana	4,796	34.45	8,808	63.28	160	1.15	96	0.69	60	0.43	0	0.00	-4,012	-28.82	13,920
Ogemaw	3,788	32.24	7,758	66.04	102	0.87	56	0.48	44	0.37	0	0.00	-3,970	-33.79	11,748
Ontonagon	1,464	39.00	2,225	59.27	31	0.83	26	0.69	8	0.21	0	0.00	-761	-20.27	3,754
Osceola	3,226	26.39	8,808	72.06	102	0.83	52	0.43	35	0.29	0	0.00	-5,582	-45.67	12,223
Oscoda	1,384	28.64	3,376	69.87	40	0.83	24	0.50	8	0.17	0	0.00	-1,992	-41.23	4,832
Otsego	4,703	32.15	9,727	66.49	90	0.62	73	0.50	37	0.25	0	0.00	-5,024	-34.34	14,630
Ottawa	59,187	35.29	106,108	63.27	1,042	0.62	1,090	0.65	273	0.16	1	0.00	-46,921	-27.98	167,701
Presque Isle	3,056	36.85	5,167	62.30	37	0.45	21	0.25	13	0.16	0	0.00	-2,111	-25.45	8,294
Roscommon	5,309	35.66	9,385	63.03	89	0.60	66	0.44	40	0.27	0	0.00	-4,076	-27.38	14,889
Saginaw	51,520	50.35	49,209	48.09	860	0.84	525	0.51	210	0.21	0	0.00	2,311	2.26	102,324
Sanilac	6,244	28.11	15,544	69.98	217	0.98	135	0.61	73	0.33	0	0.00	-9,300	-41.87	22,213
Schoolcraft	1,712	36.64	2,905	62.18	27	0.58	17	0.36	11	0.24	0	0.00	-1,193	-25.54	4,672
Shiawassee	15,830	40.88	22,110	57.10	424	1.09	245	0.63	116	0.30	0	0.00	-6,280	-16.22	38,725
St. Clair	31,846	35.18	56,476	62.38	1,190	1.31	692	0.76	330	0.36	1	0.00	-24,630	-27.20	90,535
St. Joseph	8,824	31.99	18,018	65.33	390	1.41	240	0.87	109	0.40	0	0.00	-9,194	-33.34	27,581
Tuscola	9,422	32.34	19,174	65.81	296	1.02	176	0.60	69	0.24	0	0.00	-9,752	-33.47	29,137
Van Buren	15,944	41.20	21,816	56.37	477	1.23	336	0.87	126	0.33	0	0.00	-5,872	-15.17	38,699
Washtenaw	150,529	70.08	60,745	28.28	1,227	0.57	1,962	0.91	325	0.15	1	0.00	89,784	41.80	214,789
Wayne	582,367	67.50	260,146	30.15	10,804	1.25	6,879	0.80	2,623	0.30	0	0.00	322,221	37.35	862,819
Wexford	5,684	31.38	12,122	66.93	149	0.82	116	0.64	41	0.23	0	0.00	-6,438	-35.55	18,112
Totals	2,734,568	49.90	2,642,233	48.22	50,597	0.92	39,217	0.72	13,093	0.24	12	0.00	92,335	1.68	5,479,720

Counties that flipped from Democratic to Republican

- Alger (largest municipality: Munising)
- Alpena (largest municipality: Alpena)
- Arenac (largest municipality: Standish)
- Bay (largest municipality: Bay City)
- Benzie (largest municipality: Frankfort)
- Calhoun (largest municipality: Battle Creek)
- Chippewa (largest municipality: Sault Ste. Marie)
- Clare (largest municipality: Clare)
- Clinton (largest municipality: St. Johns)
- Gladwin (largest municipality: Gladwin)
- Gogebic (largest municipality: Ironwood)
- Gratiot (largest municipality: Alma)
- Iosco (largest municipality: East Tawas)
- Isabella (largest municipality: Mount Pleasant)
- Jackson (largest municipality: Jackson)
- Lake (largest municipality: Baldwin)
- Leelanau (largest municipality: Greilickville)
- Macomb (largest municipality: Warren)
- Manistee (largest municipality: Manistee)
- Monroe (largest municipality: Monroe)
- Muskegon (largest municipality: Muskegon)
- Ogemaw (largest municipality: Skidway Lake)
- Presque Isle (largest municipality: Rogers City)
- Roscommon (largest municipality: Houghton Lake)
- Shiawassee (largest municipality: Owosso)
- St. Clair (largest municipality: Port Huron)
- Van Buren (largest municipality: South Haven)

==== By congressional district ====
Despite losing the state, James won eight of 14 congressional districts, including one that elected a Democrat.

District	Peters	James	Representative
1st	41%	58%	Jack Bergman
2nd	41%	57%	Bill Huizenga
3rd	45%	53%	Justin Amash
3rd	45%	53%	Peter Meijer
4th	38%	61%	John Moolenaar
5th	53%	45%	Dan Kildee
6th	44%	53%	Fred Upton
7th	42%	56%	Tim Walberg
8th	48%	51%	Elissa Slotkin
9th	56%	42%	Andy Levin
10th	36%	63%	Paul Mitchell
10th	36%	63%	Lisa McClain
11th	50%	49%	Haley Stevens
12th	63%	34%	Debbie Dingell
13th	78%	19%	Rashida Tlaib
14th	78%	20%	Brenda Lawrence

== Analysis ==
Polls indicated that the race would be close, with Peters leading in most polls. In 2018, Michigan voters approved "no reason required" absentee balloting. The COVID-19 pandemic led to a record number of absentee voters. Michigan law at that time did not allow for early tabulating of absentee ballots, so the absentee ballots were tabulated after completing the tabulating of ballots from polling places. This created a "mirage" effect because more Republicans voted on election day, and more Democrats voted by absentee ballot. James was ahead when the counting of election day ballots was completed. When the absentee ballots were tabulated, and with 98% of the votes counted, Peters was declared the winner by a tight margin of one percentage point after a day of waiting. When the results were certified on November 23, Peters' margin of victory was 1.68%.

Peters was able to win re-election by running up a big margin in Wayne County, home of Detroit, winning over 67% of the vote there. He also managed to improve his performance in the reliably Democratic Washtenaw County, home of Ann Arbor, improving on his 2014 election by almost three percentage points. He also came within just 1,139 votes of winning Kent County, home of Grand Rapids, having lost the county by over eight percentage points six years prior. Peters was sworn in for his second term on January 3, 2021. His term will expire on January 3, 2027.

African-Americans in Detroit were a major demographic contributing to Peters winning the election. James would later be elected as a representative in Michigan's 10th congressional district in 2022.

=== Litigation ===
After Peters took the lead in the election on the 4th, James refused to concede the race. The following day, James claimed that he had been cheated out of winning the election in a statement published on his campaign website. The statement said that there were "[...] deep concerns that millions of Michiganders may have been disenfranchised by a dishonest few who cheat" and that "[...] there is enough credible evidence to warrant an investigation to ensure that elections were conducted in a transparent, legal and fair manner." A lawyer for James' campaign alleged that fraud was committed at the TCF Center, which the Trump campaign had also attempted to claim in a dismissed lawsuit. James conceded the election to Peters on November 24.

== See also ==
- 2020 Michigan elections

== Notes ==
Partisan clients
