= 2002 Michigan Attorney General election =

- November 5, 2002
- Turnout: 30.57%
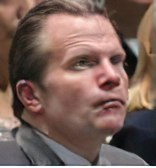

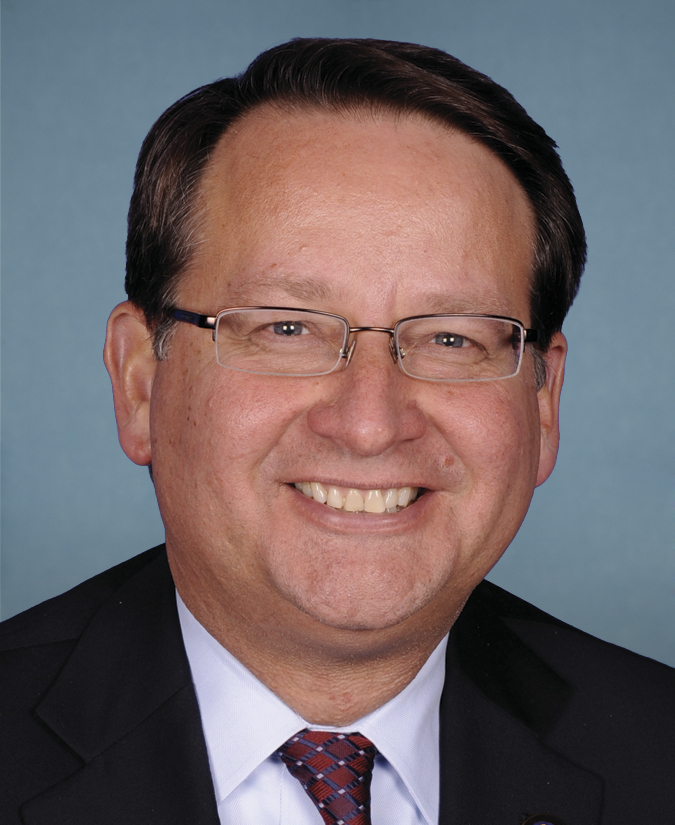
Nominee	Mike Cox	Gary Peters
Party	Republican	Democratic
Popular vote	1,499,066	1,493,866
Percentage	48.86%	48.69%
- County results Cox: 40-50% 50-60% 60-70% 70-80% Peters: 40–50% 50–60% 60–70%
Attorney General before election
Jennifer Granholm
Democratic
Elected Attorney General
Mike Cox
Republican

The 2002 Michigan Attorney General election was held on November 5, 2002. Incumbent Democratic Attorney General Jennifer Granholm chose not to seek re-election and instead successfully ran for governor. Republican nominee Mike Cox narrowly defeated Democratic nominee Gary Peters with 48.86% of the vote in a close race decided by 5,200 votes. Cox became the first Republican to win the Attorney General office in Michigan since Frank Millard did so in 1950.

== General election ==
=== Candidates ===
Major party candidates

- Mike Cox, Republican
- Gary Peters, Democratic

Other candidates

- Jerry Kaufman, Green
- Gerald Van Sickle, U.S. Taxpayers

=== Results ===
Michigan Attorney General election, 2002
Party	Candidate	Votes	%
Republican	Mike Cox	1,499,066	48.86
Democratic	Gary Peters	1,493,866	48.69
Green	Jerry Kaufman	47,894	1.56
U.S. Taxpayers	Gerald Van Sickle	27,186	0.89
Total votes		3,068,012	100.00
Republican gain from Democratic			
