= Joe Stroud =

American journalist

Joe Hinton Stroud (18 June 1936 – 9 May 2002) was editor and senior vice president of the Detroit Free Press from 1973 to 1998. He holds a Bachelor of Arts in history and political science from Hendrix College in Conway, Arkansas, and a master's degree in history from Tulane University (1959) in New Orleans.

A native of McGehee, Arkansas, his first job was as a reporter for the Pine Bluff, Arkansas Commercial. Then, from 1960 to 1964, Stroud worked at the Arkansas Gazette in Little Rock, and from 1964 to 1968, he was editorial writer and editorial page editor at the Winston-Salem Journal. He joined the Detroit Free Press in 1968 as an associate editor, and in 1973, he was appointed editor and senior vice president, a position he held until his retirement in 1998.

As editor for 25 years of one of the largest daily newspapers in the United States, Stroud was recognized time and again for his insight and journalistic excellence. He received the William Allen White Award for editorial excellence five times (1973–1980), the Overseas Press Club of America Citation (1974), the Paul Tobekin Award from Columbia University, a Distinguished Service Award from the Michigan Women's Commission (1984) and the Detroit Press Club Foundation Award for Editorial-Opinion/Print (1990). He was also a finalist in the 1982 Pulitzer Prize competition and was awarded the Laity Award by the Detroit Annual Conference of the United Methodist Church in 1985.

In addition, Stroud has received honorary degrees from Eastern Michigan University (1977), Adrian College (1984), Kalamazoo College (1984), Central Michigan University (1986), Michigan State University (1987) and Olivet College. In 1978, he was named a distinguished alumnus of Hendrix College, and he has been elected to the Michigan Journalist Hall of Fame (1998).

As described in his bio for the Michigan Hall of Fame, his editorials have mirrored Michigan. "There's an aphorism that suggests that nothing contributes more to peace of soul than having no opinion at all. If that, indeed, is the price for a peaceful soul, it has no currency on the editorial pages over which Joe Stroud presides," wrote Neal Shine, former publisher of the Detroit Free Press. After announcing his retirement as editor, Stroud wrote, "I've been proud to be editor of the Free Press. I've had a lot of freedom, a lot of support and a wonderfully forgiving audience."

In 1980, Stroud completed the American Management Association's business management program, and, a year later, he participated in the executive program at the Amos Tuck School of Business at Dartmouth College.

Stroud is a former president of the National Conference of Editorial Writers Foundation and the National Conference of Editorial Writers, and organization that has designated him a life member. His other professional affiliations have included the American Society of Newspaper Editors and Sigma Delta Chi.

Previously, Stroud served on the board of governors of the Cranbrook Institute of Science, including a term as chair, and the board of associates of Adrian College. He was also a trustee of the Cranbrook Educational Community and Starr Commonwealth Schools.

Stroud was at the time of his death a professor at Albion College and director of the Ford Institute of Public Policy at Albion College.

Stroud was married to Kathleen M. Fojtik (his second marriage) and has five children, one of whom is also a journalist. He has two brothers, who also held careers in journalism, George H Stroud and William H Stroud.
