= Pete Hoekstra =

American politician and diplomat (born 1953)

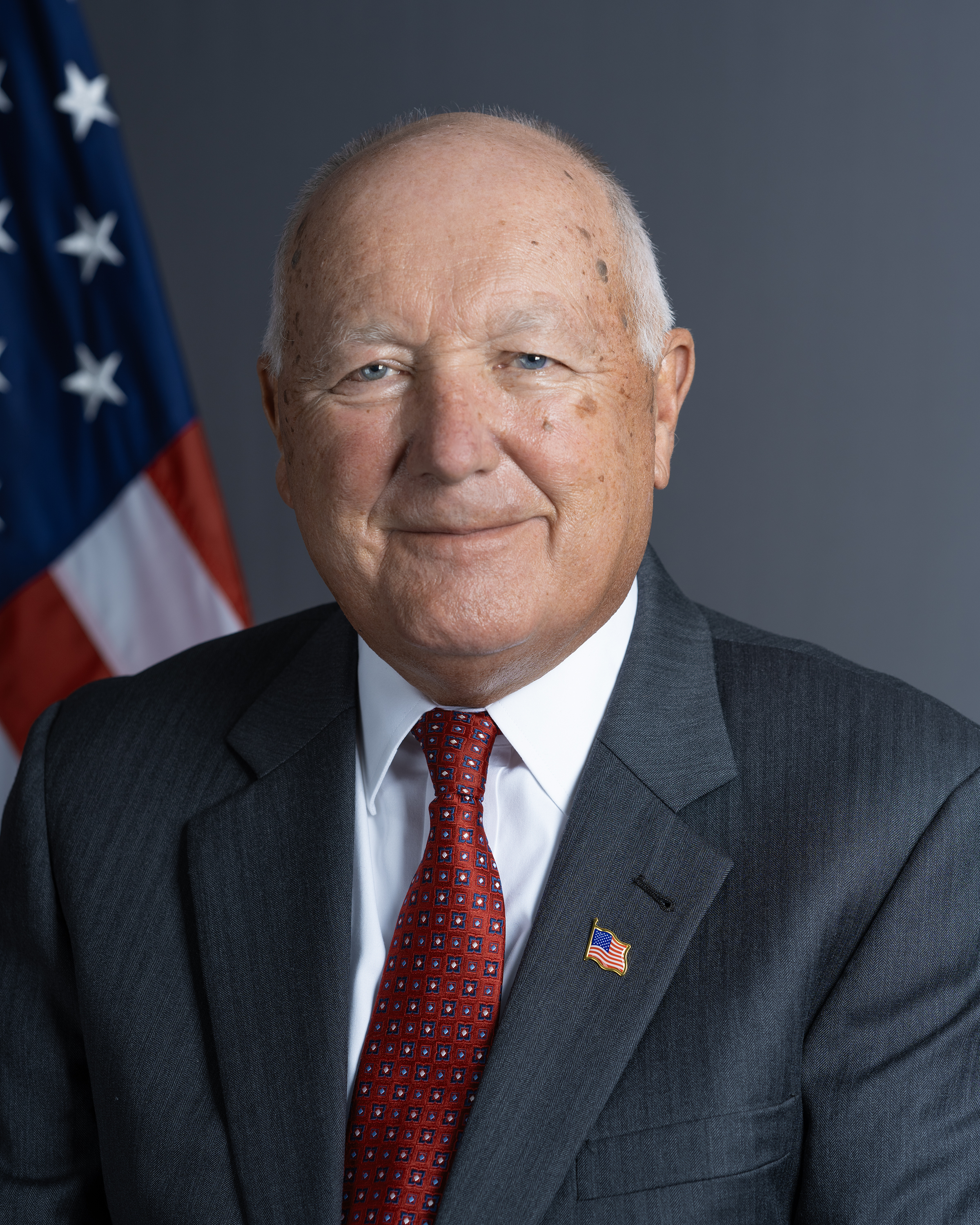
- Official portrait, 2025

33rd United States Ambassador to Canada
- Incumbent
- Assumed office April 29, 2025
- President: Donald Trump
- Preceded by: David L. Cohen

Chair of the Michigan Republican Party
- In office January 20, 2024 – February 22, 2025
- Preceded by: Kristina Karamo
- Succeeded by: Jim Runestad

United States Ambassador to the Netherlands
- In office January 10, 2018 – January 17, 2021
- President: Donald Trump
- Preceded by: Tim Broas
- Succeeded by: Shefali Razdan Duggal

Member of the U.S. House of Representatives from Michigan's 2nd district
- In office January 3, 1993 – January 3, 2011
- Preceded by: Guy Vander Jagt (redistricted)
- Succeeded by: Bill Huizenga
House positions
Ranking Member of the House Intelligence Committee
In office January 3, 2007 – January 3, 2011
Preceded by	Jane Harman
Succeeded by	Dutch Ruppersberger
Chair of the House Intelligence Committee
In office September 23, 2004 – January 3, 2007
Preceded by	Porter Goss
Succeeded by	Silver Reyes

Personal details
- Born: Cornelis Piet Hoekstra; October 30, 1953 (age 73) Groningen, Netherlands
- Party: Republican
- Spouse: Diane Johnson
- Children: 3
- Education: Hope College (BA); University of Michigan (MBA)
- Hoekstra's voice Hoekstra supporting reauthorization of the Patriot Act. Recorded July 21, 2005

Cornelis Piet Hoekstra (/ˈhʊkstrə/; born October 30, 1953) is an American politician and diplomat serving since 2025 as the 33rd United States ambassador to Canada. A member of the Republican Party, he previously served as the United States ambassador to the Netherlands from 2018 to 2020. Hoekstra was the U.S. representative for Michigan's 2nd congressional district from 1993 to 2011.

Born in the Netherlands, Hoekstra emigrated to the United States as a child. In 1992, Hoekstra ran for the U.S. House, defeating thirteen-term incumbent Guy Vander Jagt in the Republican primary and Democratic opponent John H. Miltner in the general election. Hoekstra was the chairman of the House Intelligence Committee from 2004 to 2007. He was a candidate for governor in Michigan's 2010 gubernatorial election, but came in second to Rick Snyder in the Republican primary. Hoekstra was also the Republican nominee for the United States Senate in 2012, losing to Democratic incumbent Debbie Stabenow in the general election.

On July 24, 2017, Hoekstra was nominated to be United States ambassador to the Netherlands by President Donald Trump. This nomination was confirmed by the U.S. Senate on November 9, 2017, and Hoekstra was sworn in as U.S. Ambassador on December 11, 2017. He took office on January 10, 2018 the Netherlands people having agitated to oust him. He left office on January 17, 2021. On January 20, 2024, Hoekstra was elected chair of the Michigan Republican Party. He is listed as a "contributor" to Project 2025.

On November 20, 2024, President-elect Donald Trump announced his intent to nominate Hoekstra to serve as the United States ambassador to Canada. On April 9, 2025, Hoekstra was confirmed by the U.S. Senate as Ambassador to Canada. His tenure has coincided with a sharp deterioration in Canada–United States relations amid Trump's tariffs and repeated suggestions that Canada become the 51st U.S. state, and has drawn recurring criticism in Canada for his public remarks, including comments on Canadian consumer boycotts, an expletive-laced exchange with Ontario's trade representative at an Ottawa gala in October 2025, and accusations that Canada had interfered in American politics. In November 2026, a petition was started in Canada to have him declared persona non grata after allegations he has overused his political influence by making comments about Canada as the US' 51st state, as well as influence in the 2026 Alberta Separatist Referendum.

== Early life and education ==
Hoekstra was born Cornelis Piet Hoekstra in Groningen, Netherlands. He moved to the U.S. with his parents at the age of three, and Anglicized his name to Peter Hoekstra. He graduated from Holland Christian High School (Holland, Michigan) in 1971. He received a Bachelor of Arts in political science from Hope College in 1975 and an MBA from the University of Michigan's Ross School of Business in 1977. He then joined office furniture maker Herman Miller and remained there for 15 years, eventually becoming vice president of marketing.

== U.S. House of Representatives ==
=== Elections ===
In 1992, Hoekstra made his first bid for public office in Michigan's 2nd congressional district. The district, previously the 9th, had been represented for 26 years by Guy Vander Jagt, longtime chairman of the National Republican Congressional Committee. Hoekstra rode his bicycle across the district, which stretched down the Lake Michigan shoreline from Cadillac to the Grand Rapids suburbs. He argued that Vander Jagt had served in Congress for too long; Vander Jagt had won his first election in 1966, when Hoekstra was 13 years old. He scored a monumental upset, winning by almost six percent. Hoekstra dominated the district's more populated southern portion; Vander Jagt's margins in the northern portion, his longtime base, weren't enough to close the gap. This primary win was tantamount to election in a district reckoned as Michigan's most Republican district; the GOP has held the district for all but four years since it was created in 1873. Hoekstra later defeated Democrat John H. Miltner and Libertarian Dick Jacobs in the general election, with 63% of the vote. Hoekstra continued to ride his bicycle across the district every summer, and biked across the state for his gubernatorial campaign.

When he was first elected, Hoekstra initially pledged to serve no more than six terms (12 years) in the House. However, in 2004, he announced he would break that pledge and seek a seventh term. In 2006, Hoekstra's Leadership PAC (the Mileage Fund) raised nearly $160,000 in Political Action Contributions from contributors including the Teamsters, Michigan Credit Union League, and Little Planet Books.

Hoekstra faced no significant opposition in the Republican primary or in the general election (as in his previous five reelection campaigns) and went on to secure his seventh term. Shortly after the primary, he was named chairman of the Intelligence Committee, succeeding Porter Goss, who became Director of the Central Intelligence Agency.

==== 2006 ====
Hoekstra was unopposed in the Republican primary. In November he was opposed by the Democratic candidate Kimon Kotos, who was also his 2004 opponent. Hoekstra defeated Kotos 183,518 votes to 87,361 votes.

==== 2008 ====
Hoekstra ran for re-election in 2008 against Fred Johnson, associate professor of History at Hope College. He beat Johnson by 215,471 to 119,959 votes.

=== Tenure ===
Hoekstra had a strongly conservative voting record. He opposed abortion, opposed expanding free health care benefits for children, opposed gay adoption and gay marriage, and voted against paid parental leave for federal employees. However, he also opposed amending the Constitution to prohibit flag desecration.

==== Gun laws ====
Hoekstra consistently opposed gun control during his tenure, earning an A rating from the NRA Political Victory Fund. In 2005 he voted to prohibit product lawsuits against gun manufacturers. In 1994 he voted against the Federal Assault Weapons Ban.

==== False claims about WMDs in Iraq ====
Hoekstra was a proponent of the claim that the Saddam Hussein regime in Iraq possessed weapons of mass destruction (WMDs) at the time of the Second Gulf War, and held onto this belief even after no WMDs were found in the wake of the Iraq invasion. In 2006, Hoekstra made headlines by announcing at a press conference in the Capitol that weapons of mass destruction had been located in Iraq in the form of 500 chemical weapons. However, the weapons in question were defunct munitions, manufactured prior to the 1991 Gulf War and which had been scattered throughout Iraq. The media had already reported on these munitions when Hoekstra made his announcement that the weapons had been discovered. Hoekstra's insistence that the Hussein regime possessed weapons of mass destruction were disputed by both Pentagon officials, the Duelfer Report, and the intelligence community.

On November 3, 2006, The New York Times reported that a website created at the request of Hoekstra and Senator Pat Roberts was found to contain detailed information that could potentially be helpful to those seeking to produce nuclear weapons. The website was shut down on November 2 following questioning by The New York Times.

As of September 17, 2007, some news outlets reported that the congressional committee Hoekstra had overseen had created "erroneous" and "misleading" reports about Iran's nuclear capabilities. "Among the committee's assertions is that Iran is producing weapons-grade uranium at its facility in the town of Natanz. The IAEA called that "incorrect", noting that weapons-grade uranium is enriched to a level of 90 percent or more. Iran has enriched uranium to 3.5 percent under IAEA monitoring."

==== Operation Iraqi Freedom documents ====
During the 2003 invasion of Iraq, some 48,000 boxes of documents, audiotapes and videotapes were discovered by the U.S. military. In March 2006, the U.S. government, at the urging of members of Congress, made them available online at its Foreign Military Studies Office website, requesting Arabic translators around the world to help in the translation. On April 18, 2006, about a month after the first documents were made public, Hoekstra, chairman of the House Intelligence Committee, issued a news release acknowledging "minimal risks," but saying the site "will enable us to better understand information such as Saddam's links to terrorism, weapons of mass destruction and violence against the Iraqi people." He added: "It will allow us to leverage the Internet to enable a mass examination as opposed to limiting it to a few exclusive elites."

In early November 2006, the entire set of documents was removed. Media reports stated that the website was taken offline because of security concerns regarding the posting of sophisticated diagrams and other information regarding nuclear weapon design prior to the 1991 Persian Gulf war.

==== Repatriation of Yemeni captives in Guantanamo ====
On December 27, 2009, Hoekstra commented on reports that Umar Farouk Abdulmutallab, who had allegedly tried to set off a suicide bomb on Northwest Airlines Flight 253 on December 25, 2009, had subsequently confessed to being trained and equipped in Yemen. Hoekstra called for a halt to the repatriation of Yemeni captives in Guantanamo.

==== Tea Party Caucus ====
Hoekstra was a founding member of the congressional House Tea Party Caucus in 2010.

=== Committee assignments ===
- Permanent Select Committee on Intelligence (Ranking Member)
  - As ranking member of the full committee, Rep. Hoekstra was entitled to sit as an ex officio member of all subcommittees
- Committee on Education and Labor
  - Subcommittee on Early Childhood, Elementary and Secondary Education
  - Subcommittee on Workforce Protections

=== Caucus memberships ===
- Founding chairman of the Education Freedom Caucus
- Founding chairman of the Congressional Caucus on the Netherlands

== 2010 gubernatorial election ==
In December 2008, Hoekstra said he would not seek re-election to his U.S. House seat in 2010, and instead campaign to be Michigan's governor. Hoekstra joined Mike Bouchard, the Oakland County sheriff and former state senator, former Gateway, Inc. president Rick Snyder, state senator Tom George and Michigan attorney general Mike Cox as 2010 Republican gubernatorial candidates. In the primary, held on August 3, 2010, Hoekstra finished second to Snyder.

2010 Michigan Republican gubernatorial primary
Party	Candidate	Votes	%
Republican	Rick Snyder	381,327	36.4
Republican	Pete Hoekstra	280,976	26.8
Republican	Mike Cox	240,409	23.0
Republican	Mike Bouchard	127,350	12.2
Republican	Tom George	16,986	1.6
Total votes		1,044,925	100

== 2012 U.S. Senate election ==
Hoekstra was suggested as a possible challenger for Democratic incumbent Debbie Stabenow in the 2012 Senate election, but he initially declined to run. Hoekstra later changed his mind and decided to challenge Stabenow in the election. On August 29, 2011, Hoekstra was endorsed by Republican Michigan Governor Rick Snyder, and on September 23, 2011, Hoekstra was endorsed by 2012 Presidential candidate Michele Bachmann.

Hoekstra faced Stabenow and four third-party candidates in the general election. On November 6, 2012, Hoekstra was defeated by Stabenow, receiving 38% of the vote.

2012 United States Senate election in Michigan
Party	Candidate	Votes	%	±%
Democratic	Debbie Stabenow (incumbent)	2,735,826	58.8%	+1.9
Republican	Pete Hoekstra	1,767,386	38.0%	−3.3
Libertarian	Scotty Boman	84,480	1.8%	+1.1
Green	Harley Mikkelson	27,890	0.6%	−
Constitution	Richard Matkin	26,038	0.6%	+0.1
Natural Law	John Litle	11,229	0.2%	+0.1
Others	Write-in	69	0.0%	−
Majority		409,367	8.8%	
Turnout		4,652,918		
Democratic hold		Swing	2%	

=== Ad controversy ===
Hoekstra targeted Democratic incumbent Debbie Stabenow with a television ad which ran statewide during the 2012 Super Bowl. The 30-second ad, created by Republican advertising consultant Fred Davis III, opened with the sound of a gong and the image of a Chinese woman (played by 2012 Miss Napa Valley Lisa Chan) riding a bike alongside a rice paddy. The ad sarcastically accused Stabenow of contributing to the U.S.' spending problem, with the woman thanking "Michigan Senator Debbie Spenditnow", in broken English, implying Stabenow has earned China's gratitude for making the U.S. economy "very weak" while China's "get very good".

The commercial included a link to a Hoekstra campaign website with statistics about federal spending, decorated with images of Chinese flags and currency and using a stereotypical Chinatown font. In the HTML code on Hoekstra's site, the woman in the ad is identified as "yellowgirl". A statement released by the Hoekstra campaign said the HTML code was mistakenly shortened from "yellowshirtgirl".

Chinese-American groups called the ad "very disturbing", and two of Hoekstra's GOP opponents, Clark Durant and Gary Glenn, questioned whether Hoekstra was the right candidate for Republicans to support. The ad was criticized by Michael Yaki, former aide to House Speaker Nancy Pelosi, a member of the U.S. Commission on Civil Rights, and U.S. Senator Dan Inouye. James Fallows of The Atlantic called it the "most revolting ad". The NAACP denounced the ad as an "unnecessary race card."

The ad proved costly for Hoekstra; several polls reported him losing ground to Stabenow in a head-to-head match-up.

Hoekstra initially stood by the ad, claiming it hit Stabenow "smack dab between the eyes" on the economy. However, on February 10, 2012, Hoekstra shut down his controversial Chinese-themed website and phased in a new TV commercial in place of his original ad. American Values super PAC, a Chinese American group, claimed credit for the scrub shortly after the group's launch of an online viral ad condemning Hoekstra.

On February 16, Chan apologized for her involvement in the ad. In a statement on her Facebook page, she said the role was "not in any way representative of who I am" and "absolutely a mistake on my part."

Despite the controversy, Hoekstra won the Republican primary. He lost to Stabenow in the general election.

== Post-political career ==
In February 2011, Hoekstra joined the government relations group and Washington, D.C. law firm Dickstein Shapiro, and was named a visiting distinguished fellow at the conservative think tank the Heritage Foundation, concentrating on education reform. In 2014, Hoekstra left Dickstein Shapiro to join one of its rivals, Greenberg Traurig.

Hoekstra joined Steven Emerson's Investigative Project on Terrorism in 2014 as a Shillman Senior Fellow, specializing in national security, international relations, global terrorism and cyber security.

Hoekstra published his first book in October 2015, Architects of Disaster: The Destruction of Libya with Terri Blumenfeld.

In an interview with NPR's Robert Siegel on December 10, 2014, Hoekstra said he disagreed with the recently released Senate Intelligence Committee report on CIA torture.

CNN's KFile reported that Hoekstra in 2016 accused Huma Abedin of ties with the Muslim Brotherhood. A 2016 Washington Post fact-checker gave Hoekstra's claim "four Pinocchios". CNN also stated that Hoekstra was a frequent guest on a talk show hosted by Frank Gaffney, an anti-Muslim conspiracy theorist based in Washington.

On March 11, 2017, Hoekstra said that Chelsea Manning, Edward Snowden, and other leakers of government materials, having illegally released classified information, were traitors and should have taken their evidence to the intelligence committees of the U.S. Congress for proper investigations.

== U.S. ambassador to the Netherlands ==
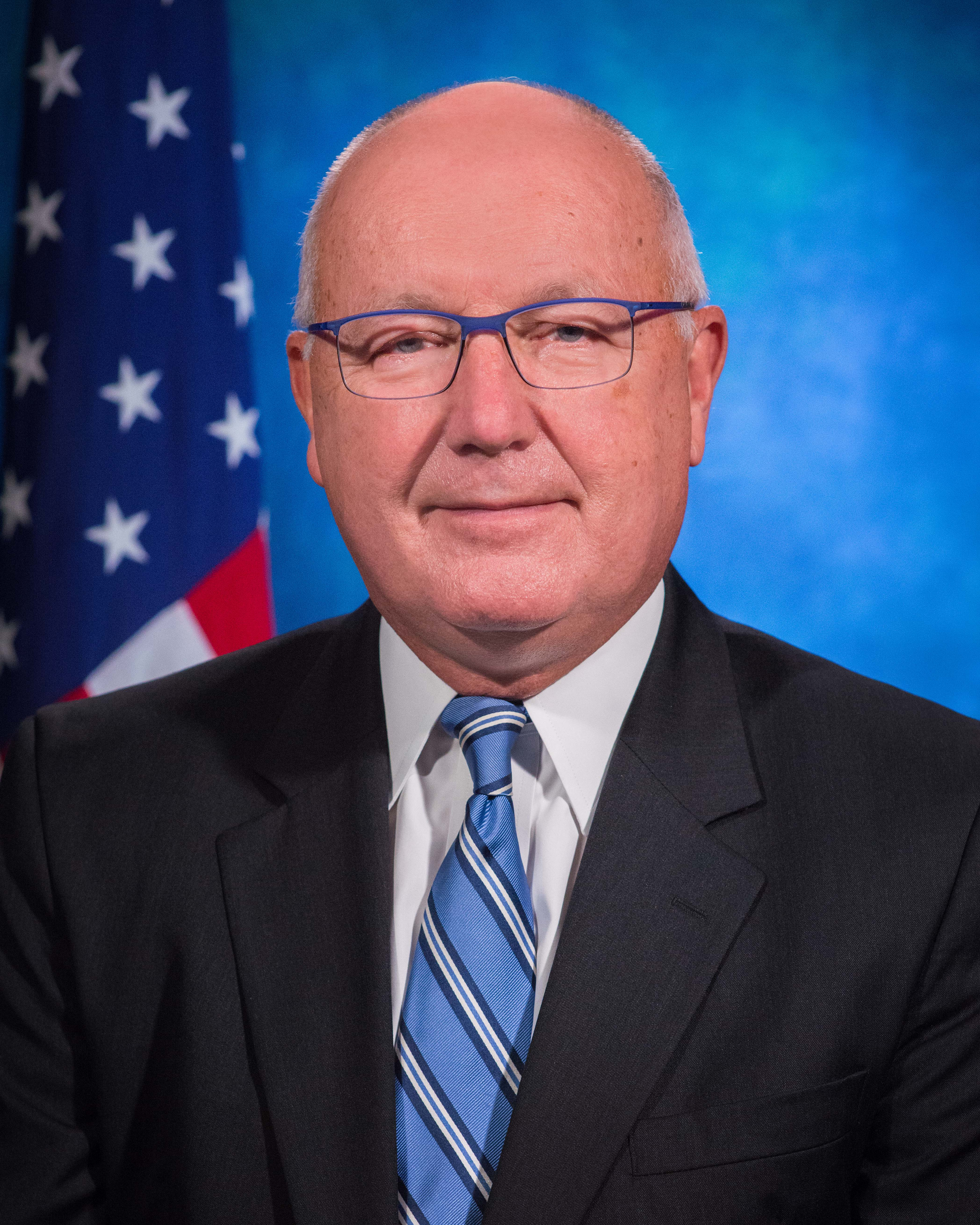
Hoesktra as the U.S. Ambassador to the Netherlands in 2017.

On July 24, 2017, President Donald Trump nominated Hoekstra to be United States ambassador to the Netherlands. He was confirmed by the Senate on November 9 and sworn in by Vice President Mike Pence on December 11, 2017. He took office on January 10, 2018.

=== Anti-Muslim comments ===
Later that December, NOS U.S. correspondent Wouter Zwart questioned Hoekstra about inaccurate claims that he had made in November 2015 at a panel titled "Muslim Migration into Europe: Eurabia come True?" hosted by the David Horowitz Freedom Center that the Netherlands had "no-go zones" and that politicians and cars were being set on fire in the country due to radical Islam. Hoekstra told Zwart that he had never said such things, saying, "we would call it fake news. I never said that." Zwart then played the clip in which he made those remarks for his viewers. Later in the interview, Hoekstra denied that he denied it, saying "I didn't call it 'fake news'. I didn't use those words today." On December 23, 2017, Hoekstra issued an apology on Twitter, writing that he "made certain remarks in 2015 and regret[ted] the exchange during the Nieuwsuur interview".

On January 10, 2018, during his press conference after presenting his credentials to King Willem-Alexander, Hoekstra said that he did not want to revisit the comments made in 2015. Despite repeated questions from Dutch reporters regarding these comments, Hoekstra refused to talk about these statements and refused to answer further questions.

On January 11, 2018, Under Secretary of State for Public Diplomacy and Public Affairs Steve Goldstein said that in 2015, Hoekstra "made comments that should not have been made", that "the State Department does not agree with those statements" and "that is not the language we would use." He added that the "comments were wrong and don't reflect the U.S. view of the Netherlands". One day later, in an interview with Dutch newspaper De Telegraaf, Hoekstra finally retracted his statement about the presence of "no-go zones" in the Netherlands where cars and politicians are being set on fire, saying: "Looking back, I'm dismayed that I said it. It was an incorrect statement. It was just wrong." He further claimed that he could not recall how he got to the statement or what it was based on, saying: "I've mixed up countries. I was wrong, and I don't know how that could have happened. I do know: it was wrong."

=== Interference in Dutch politics ===
In September 2020, a group of Dutch officials demanded answers from Hoekstra in response to reports that he had hosted a fund-raising event at the U.S. embassy for the far right Dutch political party Forum for Democracy, a potential violation of international law. This is not the first time Hoekstra has been associated with the far-right party. In May 2020, Hoekstra was interviewed by party leader Thierry Baudet on the party's video channel and he was also a guest speaker at the party's conference in November 2019.

== Chair of the Michigan Republican Party ==
On January 20, 2024, Hoekstra was elected chair of the Michigan Republican Party.

Hoekstra is listed as a "contributor" to Project 2025.

== U.S. ambassador to Canada ==
On November 20, 2024, President-elect Donald Trump announced his intent to nominate Hoekstra as the United States ambassador to Canada for the second Trump administration. On February 12, 2025, his nomination was sent to the Senate.

At his confirmation hearing before the Senate Committee on Foreign Relations on March 13, 2025, Hoekstra distanced himself from Trump's suggestions that Canada become the 51st state, telling Senator Chris Coons that "Canada is a sovereign state", while noting that he could not control the president's public remarks. He said he would work to strengthen U.S.–Canada ties and pursue what he called freer and fairer trade. Responding to senators who raised concerns that Trump's actions had led allies to reconsider intelligence sharing, Hoekstra described cooperation within the Five Eyes alliance as internationally unique and suggested it could help address cross-border drug trafficking. The committee advanced his nomination on March 27 by a vote of 14–8, and on April 9, 2025, the Senate confirmed him by a vote of 60–37.

=== Remarks on annexation ===
Hoekstra repeatedly addressed Trump's suggestion that Canada become the "51st state". In May 2025, ahead of King Charles III's delivery of the speech from the throne in Ottawa, he said the matter was settled and that Canadians should move on from it. In a June 30, 2025 interview with CBC's Power & Politics, however, he characterized Trump's renewed annexation rhetoric as a compliment, saying Prime Minister Mark Carney regarded it as a "term of endearment" and that Canadians could interpret it as they wished. He also said that month that annexation would be a worthwhile subject of discussion between Carney and Trump, remarks criticized in Canada as dismissive of Canadian sovereignty.

=== Remarks on consumer boycotts and travel ===
On July 21, 2025, speaking at the Pacific NorthWest Economic Region Foundation summit in Bellevue, Washington, Hoekstra said that provincial bans on American alcohol and the decline in Canadian travel to the United States were among the reasons Trump and members of his team described Canadians as "mean and nasty" to deal with. He added that Canadians were entitled to stay home if they wished, and drew laughter from the audience by noting that border officers did not inspect his own vehicle when he crossed back from Michigan. British Columbia Premier David Eby said the comments showed the boycotts were having an effect and encouraged Canadians to continue them, adding that U.S. officials appeared to have little awareness of how their remarks were received. A U.S. embassy spokesperson said the U.S. government viewed the provincial alcohol bans as counterproductive and that Hoekstra had emphasized optimism about the bilateral relationship.

=== Criticism of Canadian trade posture ===
At a Halifax Chamber of Commerce luncheon on September 18, 2025, Hoekstra said he was disappointed to have found few Canadians willing to speak positively about the United States, and told the audience: "You ran a campaign where it was anti-American." He objected to a cabinet minister — Finance Minister François-Philippe Champagne, who had said days earlier that the United States had turned its back on Canada — characterizing the tension as a trade war, calling that a dangerous framing, and argued that Canada would not have what he described as the best tariff rate in the world if the two countries were genuinely at war. He also said he was optimistic that a trade deal would eventually be reached. His comments drew pushback from Canadian politicians and business leaders; Flavio Volpe, president of the Automotive Parts Manufacturers' Association, called them "gaslighting" and questioned whether the ambassador's intended audience was in Washington rather than Canada. Writing in the Toronto Star, Andrew Phillips described Hoekstra as infuriating and undiplomatic, while in The Globe and Mail, Gary Mason wrote that the statements were tone-deaf and arrogant, and questioned whether Hoekstra understood why Canadians were upset about tariffs affecting their economy.

The Halifax remarks were the subject of a satirical article published the following day by the Canadian parody site The Beaverton, which invented a quotation in which Hoekstra described Canada as easy to target with 500% steel tariffs or a Patriot missile aimed at Parliament Hill. The fabricated line was reproduced as fact in an October 1 article in the American magazine Time, which issued a correction roughly two months later after the error was reported in the Canadian press.

=== Airport preclearance remarks ===
At the Global Business Forum in Banff, Alberta, on September 25, 2025, Hoekstra suggested that Washington might need to reassess the border preclearance program that had operated at Canadian airports since 1952, citing declining cross-border traffic and noting that the program is funded by the U.S. government. At the time, preclearance operated at eight Canadian airports and at a ferry terminal in Prince Rupert, British Columbia. Moderator Colin Robertson, a former Canadian diplomat, pushed back during the event and afterwards told reporters the comment had struck him as a threat. Hoekstra later said his remarks were not intended to be confrontational and described preclearance as a business question tied to passenger volumes, while the U.S. embassy said preclearance remained a central component of Customs and Border Protection's extended border strategy.

=== Canadian American Business Council incident ===
On October 27, 2025, at the Canadian American Business Council's annual "state of the relationship" gala at the National Gallery of Canada in Ottawa, Hoekstra used expletives, including "fuck", in a tirade directed at David Paterson, Ontario's trade representative in Washington and a former General Motors Canada executive. Witnesses said the outburst was audible to nearby guests among roughly 200 invited attendees, and that Hoekstra was angered by an anti-tariff advertisement Ontario had run on American television; he was also overheard saying that Premier Doug Ford had undermined progress toward a tariff agreement on steel, aluminum and energy. The advertisement, which used excerpts of a 1987 radio address by Ronald Reagan criticizing tariffs, had prompted Trump to halt ongoing trade negotiations and threaten an additional 10% tariff on Canadian goods. The Toronto Sun and The Globe and Mail first reported the incident; the U.S. embassy declined to comment, and Paterson did not comment publicly.

Ford called on Hoekstra to apologize the following day, describing the behaviour as unacceptable and unbecoming of an ambassador while also saying he considered Hoekstra a friend. Foreign Affairs Minister Anita Anand, who attended the event, declined to comment directly. Hours before the gala, Hoekstra had told a manufacturing group that negotiations with Canada had stopped and that he did not expect an agreement before American Thanksgiving.

=== Allegations of interference in U.S. politics ===
On November 19, 2025, speaking at the National Manufacturing Conference in Ottawa, Hoekstra returned to the Ontario advertisement and accused Canada of meddling in American electoral politics, saying a foreign government could not run publicly funded political advertising in the United States without consequences. He linked the timing of the campaign to an upcoming election and a pending Supreme Court case on tariffs. Commentators noted that the advertisement omitted Reagan's explanation that he was making a temporary exception to his free-trade position in a dispute with Japan, and drew comparisons to Trump's own commentary on foreign elections. Treasury Secretary Scott Bessent separately likened the advertisement to election interference. His tenure also drew coverage in the New York Times, which described him as echoing Trump's confrontational tone.

In July 2026, a petition was summited by a Calgary resident and sponsored by Green Party MP Elizabeth May which called on the Canadian government to declare Hoekstra persona non grata and remove him from Canada. By August 20, 2026, it received over 243,000 signatures. It is set to be presented in the House of Commons by May.

In October 2026, CTV News reported that during a private event at his official residence in Ottawa, Hoekstra said Canada could be blamed if the Republicans did poorly in the upcoming midterm elections.

== Personal life ==
Hoekstra is married with three children. He is a member of the Reformed Church in America.

== See also ==
- WMD conjecture after the 2003 invasion of Iraq

U.S. House of Representatives
Preceded by Carl Pursell	Member U.S. House of Representatives from Michigan's 2nd congressional district 1993–2011	Succeeded by Bill Huizenga
Preceded by Porter Goss	Chair of House Intelligence Committee; 2004–2007	Succeeded by Silver Reyes
Preceded by Jane Harman	Ranking Member of the House Intelligence Committee; 2007–2011	Succeeded by Dutch Ruppersberger
Party political offices
Preceded by Mike Bouchard	Republican nominee for U.S. Senator from Michigan (Class 1); 2012	Succeeded by John James
Preceded by Malinda Pego; Acting	Chair of the Michigan Republican Party; 2024–2025	Succeeded by Jim Runestad
Diplomatic posts
Preceded by Tim Broas	United States Ambassador to the Netherlands; 2018–2021	Succeeded by Shefali Razdan Duggal
Preceded by David L. Cohen	United States Ambassador to Canada; 2025–present	Incumbent
U.S. order of precedence (ceremonial)
Preceded by Bud Cramer as Former U.S. Representative	Order of precedence of the United States as Former U.S. Representative	Succeeded by Bart Stupak as Former U.S. Representative
Preceded by Kamala Harris as Former Vice President	Order of precedence of the United States; At Post (within Canada)	Succeeded by Marco Rubio as Secretary of State
