= Bruce Heyman =

American diplomat and banker (born 1958)

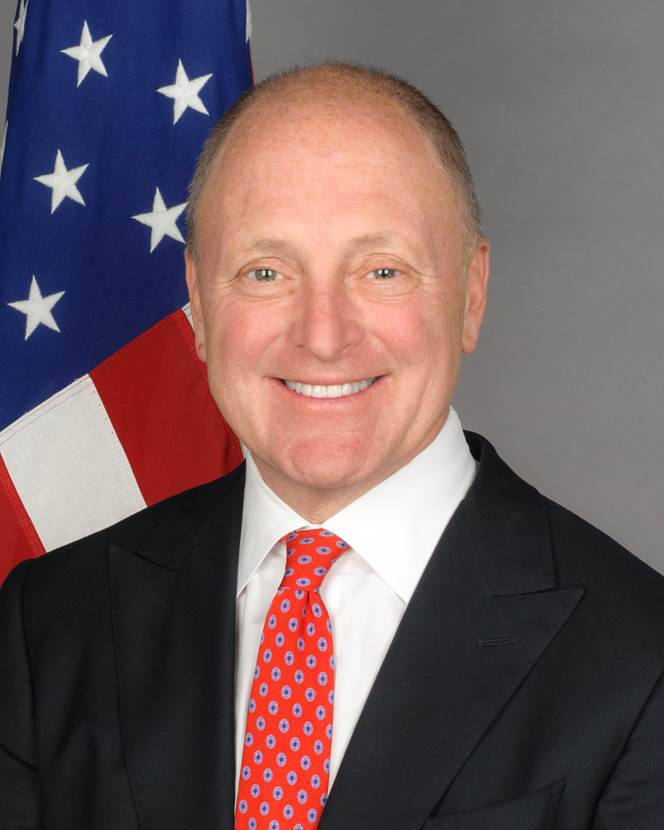

United States Ambassador to Canada
- In office April 8, 2014 – January 18, 2017
- President: Barack Obama
- Deputy: Elizabeth Moore Aubin
- Preceded by: David Jacobson
- Succeeded by: Kelly Craft

Personal details
- Born: 1958 (age 67–68) Elmira, New York, U.S.
- Party: Democratic
- Spouse: Vicki Heyman (m. 1980)
- Education: Vanderbilt University (BA, MBA)

Bruce Alan Heyman (born 1958) is an American businessman, author, and former diplomat who served as U.S. Ambassador to Canada from 2014 to 2017 under President Barack Obama.

Heyman was confirmed by the U.S. Senate on March 12, 2014 and sworn in by then-Vice President Joe Biden on March 26, 2014. He presented his credentials to the Governor General of Canada, thus beginning his duties in Ottawa, on April 8, 2014. His tenure ended on January 18, 2017.

As of 2024, Heyman is CEO of Power Sustainable Capital, a global alternative asset manager.

== Early life and education ==
Heyman was born in Elmira, New York to a Jewish family and raised in Dayton, Ohio. Heyman graduated from the Miami Valley School, and received a B.A. (1979) and an M.B.A. (1980) from Vanderbilt University.

His grandfather, Sam Malamud, had immigrated from Lithuania in 1912, adopting the surname of a cousin, Henry Heyman.

In 1977 and 1978, Heyman interned at the U.S. House of Representatives for Congressman Charles Whalen of Ohio. In the summer of 1979, Heyman was a researcher for the Small Business Committee on the Antitrust and Restraint of Trade Subcommittee.

== Career ==
In 1980, Heyman worked as a Chicago-based investment banker for Goldman Sachs. From 1985 to 1999, Heyman served as a Vice President of Goldman Sachs. From 1999 to 2014, he served as a managing director of private wealth management at Goldman Sachs, and as a Goldman partner from 2004 until his 2014 appointment as a US ambassador.

Prior to this appointment, Heyman served as a board member for the Chicago Council on Global Affairs and the Northwestern Memorial Hospital Foundation. He also served as an advisor to the Fix the Debt CEO Council of the Committee for a Responsible Federal Budget. He has been a member of The Economic Club of Chicago, The Executives' Club of Chicago, and the Facing History and Ourselves Chicago Advisory Board.

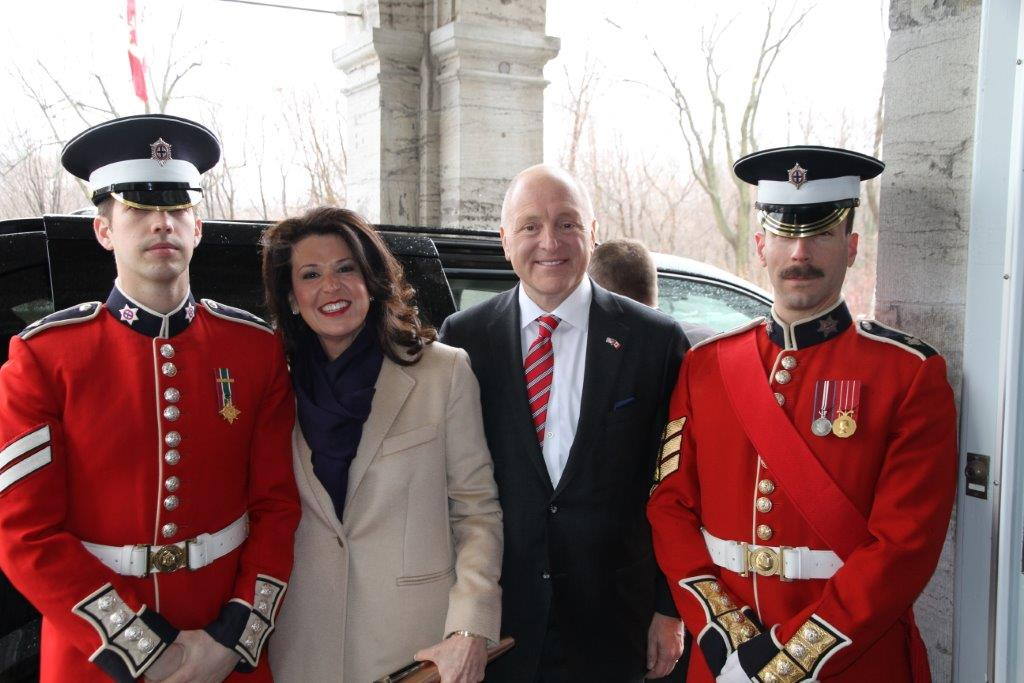
Bruce and Vicki Heyman with two Governor General's Foot Guards, before he presented his credentials as ambassador to David Lloyd Johnston, the Governor General of Canada.

On September 19, 2013, President Barack Obama nominated Heyman, who had been a major fundraiser for his two presidential campaigns, to be the U.S. Ambassador to Canada. Heyman was confirmed by the U.S. Senate on March 12, 2014. He replaced Ambassador David Jacobson. As the U.S. ambassador to Canada, Heyman became a member of the Fulbright Canada Board of Directors. In 2014 and 2016, Heyman was named one of the Top 50 Most Powerful Business People by Canadian Business.

In 2015, Heyman gave the keynote address at Niagara University's commencement ceremony. At the ceremony, Heyman was presented an honorary Doctor of Humane Letters.

In January 2017, he announced that he was stepping down as the U.S. ambassador to Canada. He was replaced by Ambassador Kelly Craft.

During the Presidency of Donald Trump, Heyman and his wife Vicki co-authored The Art of Diplomacy: Strengthening the Canada-U.S. Relationship in Times of Uncertainty, published in 2019. The book describes the Heymans' experiences liaising as ambassador and as American cultural envoy, respectively, with the Canadian administrations of Stephen Harper and Justin Trudeau under the Obama administration's approach to foreign diplomacy.

In 2019, Heyman was appointed co-chairman of the advisory board to the Canada Institute at the Wilson Center in Washington, DC.

In 2024, Heyman accepted the position of CEO at Power Sustainable, an asset management subsidiary of Power Corporation focused on North American renewable energy projects, after serving as an advisor to board chairman and outgoing CEO Olivier Desmarais for three years.

== Political activities ==
Heyman and his wife were prominent donors to then-Senator Barack Obama beginning in 2007 when they hosted a fundraising event in their home, and came to number among Obama's top fundraisers. In 2012, both he and his wife served on the Obama campaign's National Finance Committee tasked with raising funds for Obama's re-election, together contributing or collecting $1.7 million for his re-election bid.

During the 2020 Presidential Election, the Heymans co-chaired the Biden campaign's American Voter Abroad Initiative and led the outreach group Ambassadors for Biden. In 2024, Heyman has publicly supported Biden's candidacy for re-election and has remained supportive of the American Voter Abroad Initiative.

== Personal life ==
He is married to Vanderbilt then-classmate Vicki Simons who is also Jewish. The two married on June 15, 1980 in Ashland, Kentucky. They have three children: David, Liza, and Caroline, as well as six grandchildren.

His wife served on the executive board of the Center for Jewish Life at Vanderbilt University and the foundation board of the Children's Memorial Hospital in Chicago.

The Heymans are active members of the Chicago Jewish community.

Diplomatic posts
Preceded by David Jacobson	United States Ambassador to Canada; 2014–2017	Succeeded by Kelly Knight Craft
