= David H. Wilkins =

American ambassador and politician (born 1946)

David Wilkins
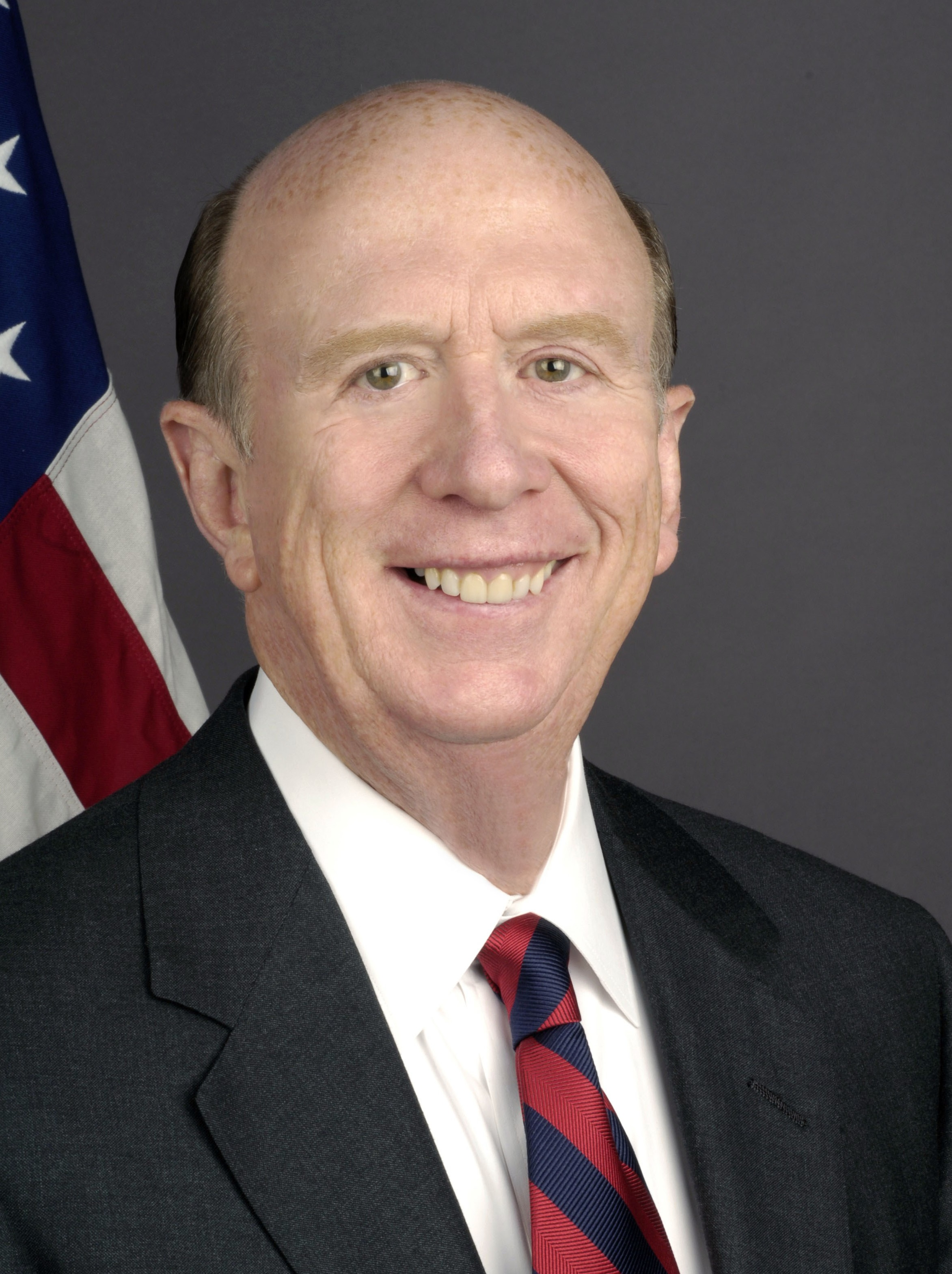

United States Ambassador to Canada
- In office June 29, 2005 – January 20, 2009
- President: George W. Bush
- Preceded by: Paul Cellucci
- Succeeded by: David Jacobson

58th Speaker of the South Carolina House of Representatives
- In office December 6, 1994 – June 21, 2005
- Preceded by: Robert Sheheen
- Succeeded by: Bobby Harrell

Member of the South Carolina House of Representatives from the 24th district
- In office December 1980 – June 21, 2005
- Preceded by: Rex L. Carter
- Succeeded by: Bruce W. Bannister

Personal details
- Born: David Horton Wilkins; October 12, 1946 (age 79) Greenville, South Carolina, U.S.
- Party: Republican
- Spouse: Susan Clary
- Relations: William Walter Wilkins; Walt Wilkins III
- Children: James; Robert
- Education: Clemson University (BA); University of South Carolina School of Law (JD)

Military service
- Allegiance: United States
- Branch/service: United States Army
- Rank: First Lieutenant

David Horton Wilkins (born October 12, 1946) is an American attorney and a former United States Ambassador to Canada during the administration of President George W. Bush. Prior to the appointment, he practiced law for 30 years while serving in the South Carolina House of Representatives for 25 of those years. He was speaker of the South Carolina House for 11 years. Wilkins presently chairs the public policy and international law practice department of a South Carolina law firm.

== Family life and education ==
A lifelong resident of South Carolina, Wilkins graduated from Greenville High School, attended Clemson University on a tennis scholarship, and graduated cum laude with a bachelor's degree in 1968. He earned his J.D. degree from the University of South Carolina and then served in the United States Army as a first lieutenant. In the early 1970s, he returned to Greenville, where he and his wife, Susan, raised their two sons.

== Public service ==
=== State legislature ===
Wilkins, a Republican, was first elected to the South Carolina House of Representatives in 1980. He rose through the ranks of the Democratically-controlled House, serving six years as chairman of the Judiciary Committee and two years as speaker pro tem before being elected speaker, a position he held for 11 years. He was the first Republican to be elected speaker of any legislative body in the South since Reconstruction and when he retired on June 2, 2005, he was the third-longest-serving speaker in South Carolina history.

In his 25 years in the state legislature, Wilkins played a role in major reform legislation including South Carolina's ethics bill and the Education Accountability Act. Wilkins was also a figure in the relocation of the Confederate battle flag from atop the State Capitol Building to behind the Confederate Memorial. The flag was removed from the statehouse grounds in 2015. Under his watch, the state adopted the Martin Luther King holiday. As speaker, Wilkins also played a role in banning video gambling from South Carolina and in delaying the establishment of the South Carolina Education Lottery. During the economic recession of the 1990s, Wilkins successfully fought tax increases, and as a result, South Carolina was one of only a handful of states that did not raise its taxes.

Throughout his legislative career, Wilkins received numerous awards including the 2004 Excellence in State Legislative Leadership Award from the National Conference of State Legislatures which cited his steadfast position for relocating the Confederate flag and his refusal to cancel a national conference in the wake of the 9/11 terrorist attacks. Wilkins was also named Outstanding Legislator of the Year by a wide range of organizations, and he served as President of the National Speakers' Association and as chair of the Southern Legislative Conference.

=== Political activities and appointment as ambassador to Canada ===
Wilkins was state chair of the Bush–Cheney '04 campaign and co-chair of the campaign in 2000. He was appointed by President George W. Bush to the Board of Visitors to the United States Military Academy at West Point in 2002.

He was nominated by President Bush for the post of United States Ambassador to Canada on April 27, 2005, and the Senate confirmed him by voice vote on May 26, 2005. Wilkins formally presented his credentials to the Governor General of Canada Adrienne Clarkson on June 29, 2005.

=== Tenure as ambassador ===
Upon his arrival in Canada, Wilkins pledged his commitment to "strengthening the ties that bind our two great nations." In an April 2008 interview, Wilkins reiterated that sentiment stating, "we have the largest trading relationship the world's ever known, and I think the best relationship. To just remind ourselves on both sides of the border how important we are to each other and keep trying to make it stronger -- that's certainly my goal."

Before his appointment, Wilkins had only been to Canada once, when he was in the United States Army Reserve three decades prior.

In his first 20 months as ambassador, the top irritant between the nations – softwood lumber – was resolved, with the support of most of the Canadian lumber industry. In addition to the softwood lumber dispute, Wilkins addressed a number of other issues including the Northwest Passage, Rendition, the North American Free Trade Agreement (NAFTA), and Canada's role in Afghanistan.

Wilkins left office in January 2009, at the end of President Bush's second term.

== Clemson University activities ==
Wilkins was awarded an honorary doctorate of humanities in 2003 from the University, where he also earned the Alumni Association's Distinguished Service Award.

On 28 March 2007, Wilkins was elected by the University's Board of Trustees as a Successor Trustee to serve on the University’s 13 member Board.

== Post-government career ==
In February 2009, Wilkins became a partner at Nelson Mullins Riley & Scarborough LLP and chairs the Public Policy and International Law practice group, which focuses primarily on representing businesses on both sides of the U.S.-Canada border.

Diplomatic posts
Preceded by Paul Cellucci	United States Ambassador to Canada; 2005–2009	Succeeded by David Jacobson
