= Peter B. Teeley =

American diplomat (1940–2024)

Peter Teeley
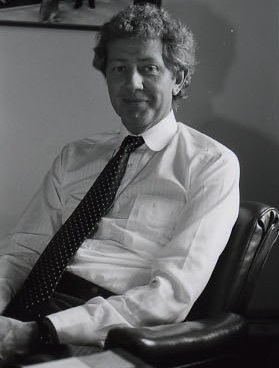
- Peter Teeley in 1981

24th United States Ambassador to Canada
- In office July 3, 1992 – February 28, 1993
- President: George H. W. Bush; Bill Clinton
- Preceded by: Edward N. Ney
- Succeeded by: James Blanchard

Personal details
- Born: January 12, 1940 Barrow-in-Furness, Lancashire, England
- Died: November 29, 2024 (aged 84) Washington, D.C., U.S.
- Spouse: Victoria Ann Casey
- Children: 5

Peter Barry Teeley (January 12, 1940 – November 29, 2024) was an American political consultant and diplomat, who served as press secretary to Vice President George H. W. Bush from 1981 to 1985, and as United States Ambassador to Canada from 1992 to 1993.

== Career ==
Teeley was born on January 12, 1940, in Barrow-in-Furness, and moved to the United States with his family in 1947.

Teeley was press secretary to Senators Robert P. Griffin and Jacob Javits prior to joining Gerald Ford's campaign staff in 1976. Following Ford's defeat in that year's presidential election, he became communications director for the Republican National Committee, and joined Bush's campaign staff in 1980. He served as Press Secretary on the Bush campaign when wrote in to Bush's speeches attacking Ronald Reagan's economic policy as "Voodoo economics".

He left the White House in 1985 to launch his own consulting firm, but was later appointed the American representative to the United Nations Children's Fund in 1990.

He was appointed United States Ambassador to Canada in 1992, and served until February 28, 1993, shortly after Bill Clinton succeeded Bush to the presidency. He subsequently joined Amgen as its vice-president of government and public relations.

Teeley was diagnosed with cancer in 1991. He subsequently published a book about his treatment and recovery, The Complete Cancer Survival Guide, in 2000. Teeley died of cancer at MedStar Georgetown University Hospital, on November 29, 2024, at the age of 84.
