= Edward N. Ney =

American businessman and diplomat

United States Ambassador to Canada
- In office June 30, 1989 – June 20, 1992
- President: George H. W. Bush
- Preceded by: Thomas Niles
- Succeeded by: Peter Teeley

Personal details
- Born: Edward Noonan Ney; May 26, 1925 Saint Paul, Minnesota, U.S.
- Died: January 8, 2014 (aged 88)
- Party: Republican

Edward Noonan Ney (May 26, 1925 – January 8, 2014) was the chief executive officer of advertising agency Young & Rubicam from 1970 to 1986, and served as United States Ambassador to Canada from 1989 to 1992.

== Biography ==
=== Early life ===
Edward N. Ney was born in Saint Paul, Minnesota on May 26, 1925, the son of John J. Ney, a manager for American Standard Brands. He went to high school at the John Burroughs School in St. Louis, Missouri. He then attended Amherst College. During World War II, he served in the United States Naval Air Corps. After the war, he returned to Amherst and received his B.A. in 1946.

In 1950, Ney married Suzanne Hayes and together the couple had three children, Nicholas (b. Feb. 12, 1953), Hillary (b. 1954), and Michelle (b. Dec. 9, 1955). In 1974 they divorced and he married Judy Lasky the same year. In 2010, he married a last time Patricia Wood, widow of tennis champion Sidney Wood and sister of fashion editor Catherine Murray di Montezemolo.

=== Career ===
In 1951, Ney joined Young & Rubicam, the world's largest advertising communications company, as an account manager. Ney worked his way up the ranks at Young & Rubicam, eventually becoming the company's president and then, in 1970, its chief executive officer, a position he held until 1986. He was chairman of Young & Rubicam from 1986 until 1989. He was also Vice-Chairman of Paine Webber during the same years. Ney was inducted into the American Advertising Federation Hall of Fame in 1988.

Besides his work at Young & Rubicam, Ney was active in the Republican Party. He became a member of the Council on Foreign Relations in 1974. President of the United States Gerald Ford appointed Ney to the board of Radio Free Europe/Radio Liberty in 1975. He was a trustee of the National Urban League from 1977 to 1986. He chaired the Visiting Committee on Afro-American Studies at Harvard University from 1977 until 1984. In 1982, President Ronald Reagan appointed Ney to the executive committee of the Grace Commission, where he served until 1986. He became a trustee of the Museum of Television and Radio in 1982, and of the George Bush Presidential Library in 1994.

In 1989, President George H. W. Bush nominated Ney as United States Ambassador to Canada. Ambassador Ney presented his credentials on June 30, 1989 and served in Ottawa until June 20, 1992.

After his time as ambassador, Ney returned to Young & Rubicam as chairman.

Ney sat on the Boards of Directors of several corporations, including Barrick Gold, Power Corporation of Canada and Mattel.

Ney died at the age of 88 on January 8, 2014.

=== Recognition ===
- 1989, International Radio & Television Society Gold Medal
- 1987, Advertising Hall of Fame
- 1975, Golden Plate Award of the American Academy of Achievement

Diplomatic posts
Preceded by Thomas Niles	United States Ambassador to Canada; June 30, 1989 – June 20, 1992	Succeeded by Peter Teeley
