= David C. Jacobson =

American diplomat (born 1951)

David Jacobson
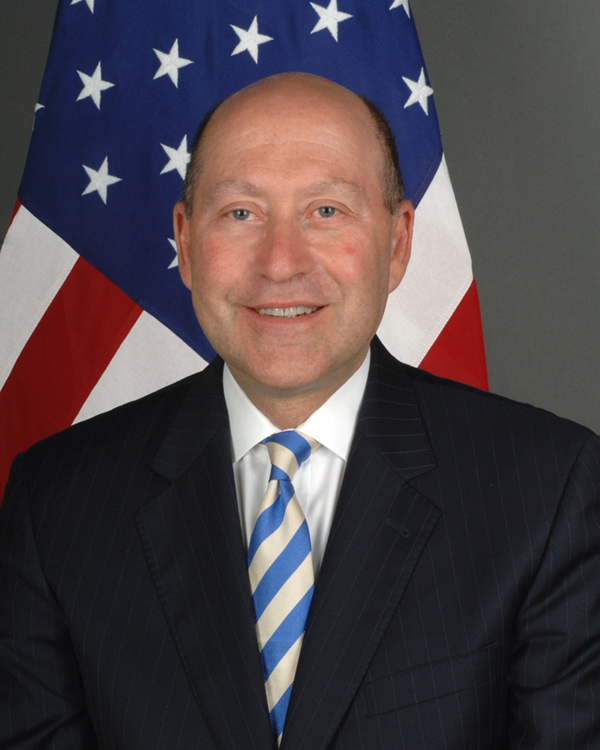

United States Ambassador to Canada
- In office October 2, 2009 – July 15, 2013
- President: Barack Obama
- Preceded by: David Wilkins
- Succeeded by: Bruce Heyman

Personal details
- Born: David Cary Jacobson; October 9, 1951 (age 74) Chicago, Illinois, U.S.
- Party: Democratic
- Education: Johns Hopkins University; Georgetown University Law Center

David Cary Jacobson (born October 9, 1951) is an American lawyer who served as the 29th United States Ambassador to Canada.

== Biography ==
A graduate of Johns Hopkins University and Georgetown University Law Center, he spent much of his career working in the Chicago offices of Sonnenschein Nath & Rosenthal, a law firm.

He became a fundraiser for Barack Obama's presidential campaign in 2008. He subsequently worked on Obama's presidential transition team in the Office of Presidential Personnel.

Jacobson's appointment as United States Ambassador to Canada was confirmed by the United States Senate. His confirmation hearings began on August 5, 2009 and the final confirmation occurred September 23, 2009 by unanimous consent. His credentials were accepted by Governor General Michaëlle Jean on October 2, 2009, and he took his post as ambassador.

On May 21, 2013, Jacobson announced his departure from the Embassy after nearly four years as Ambassador to Canada, effective July 15.

In October 2013, he became vice chairman of the Canadian-American BMO Financial Group.
