= Lornado =

Residence of the US ambassador to Canada

Coordinates: 45.4542°N 75.6865°W

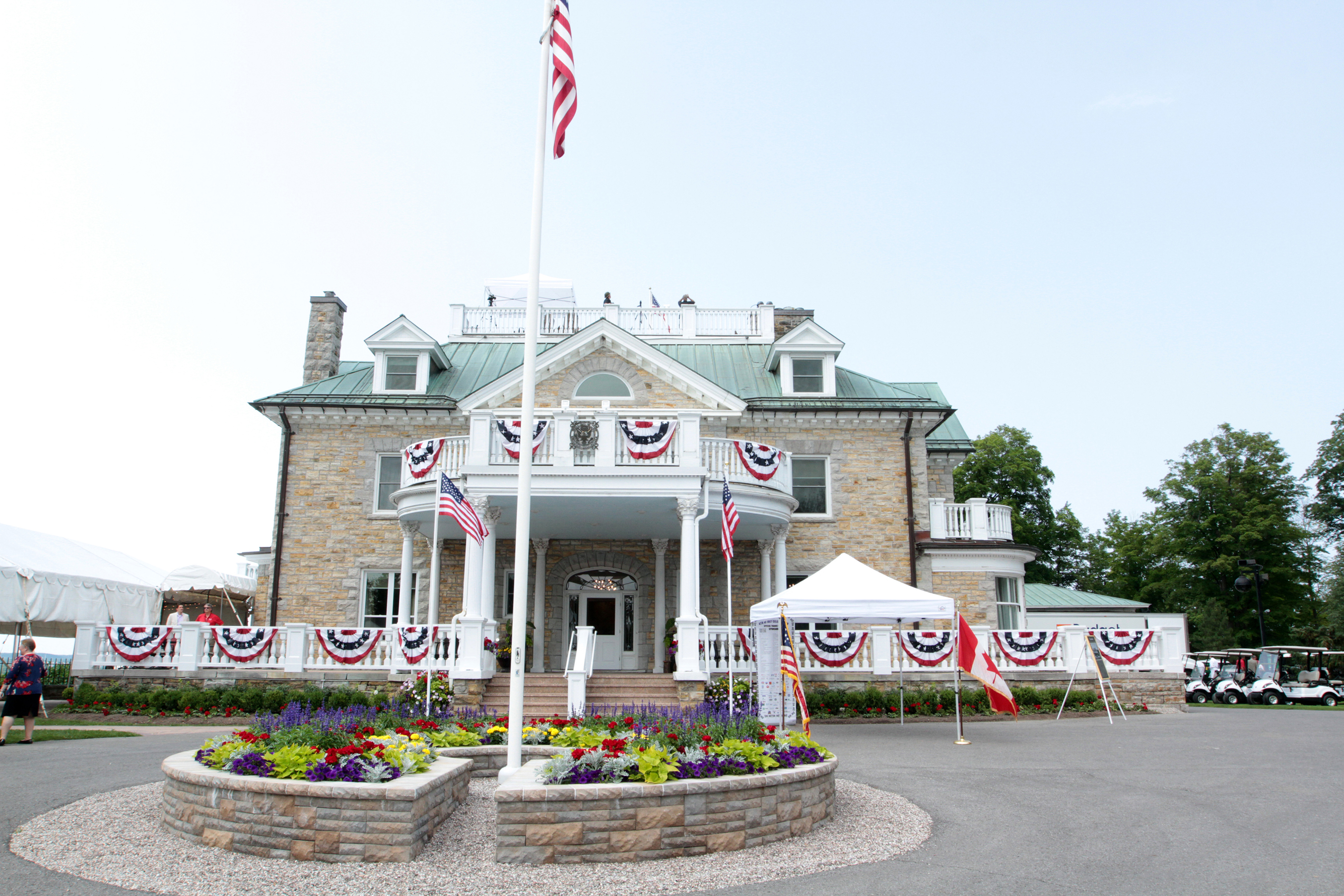
- Interactive map of the Lornado area

General information
- Type: Official residence
- Location: Ottawa, Ontario, Canada
- Completed: 1908
- Client: Warren Y. Soper
- Owner: United States government (since 1935)

Technical details
- Floor count: 2.5
- Grounds: 10 acres (4.0 ha)

Other information
- Number of rooms: 32

Website
- ca.usembassy.gov/u-s-embassy-ottawa/

Lornado is the official residence of the United States ambassador to Canada. It is located in the Rockcliffe Park area of Ottawa, Ontario.

== History ==
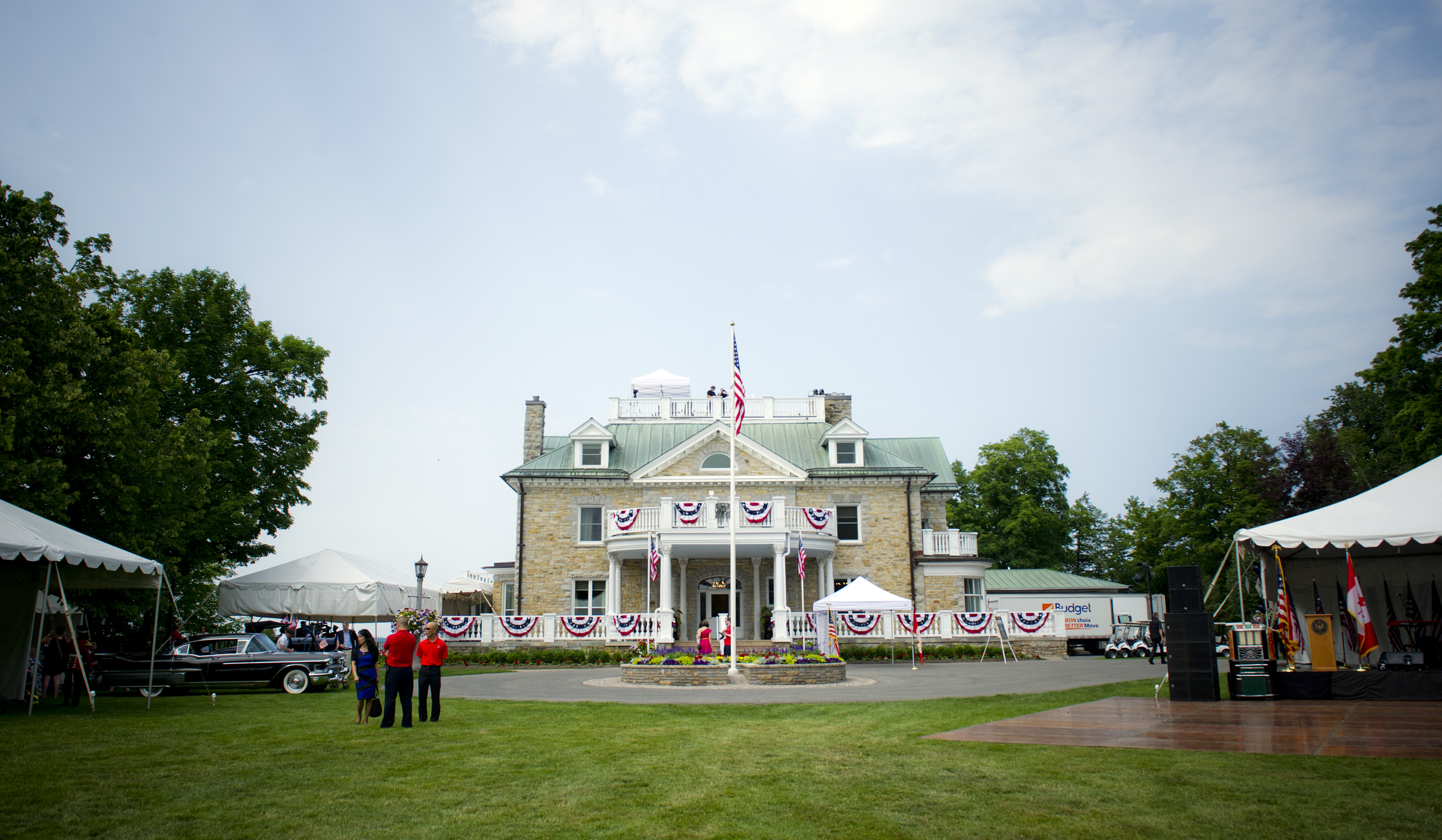
The front of Lornado on July 4, 2015

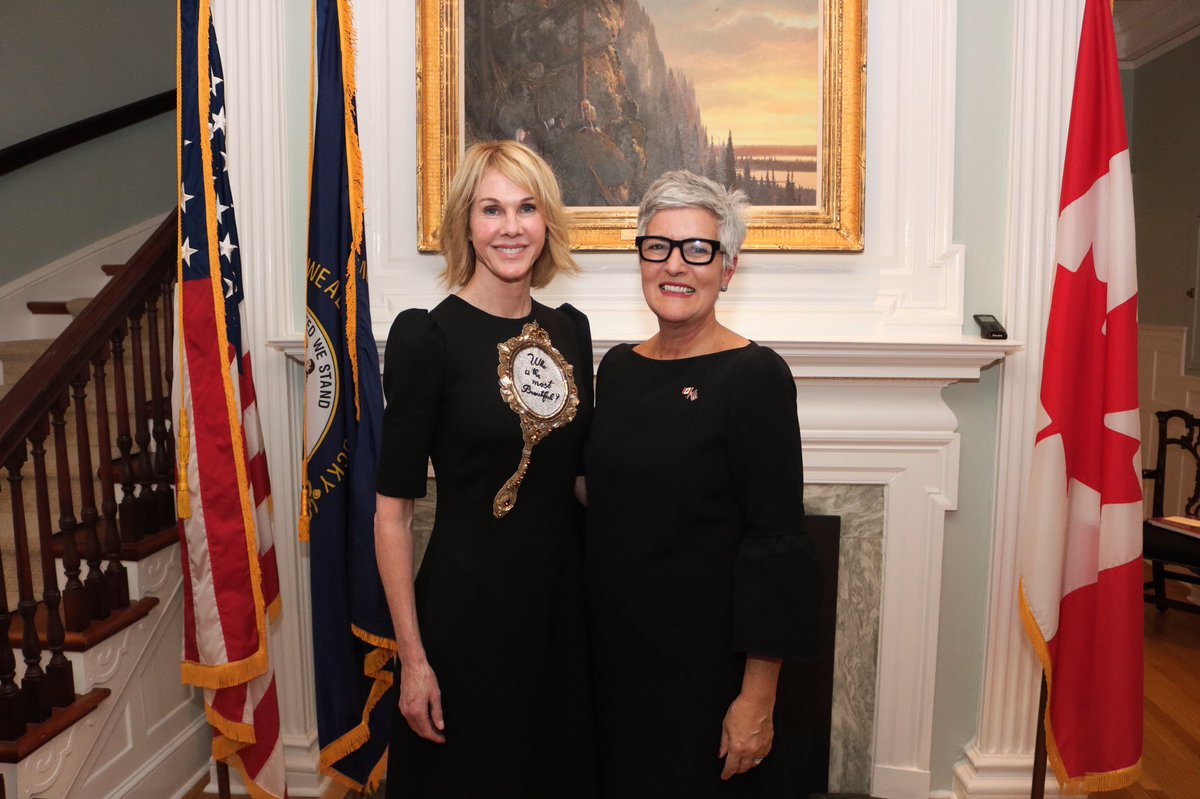
U.S. Ambassador to Canada Kelly Craft (left) hosting members of the Performing Arts Center Consortium at Lornado in 2017

The house was built in 1908 for Warren Y. Soper, an American-born, Ottawa-based industrialist. Soper was the co-founder of the Ottawa Electric Railway Company—Ottawa's first public transit system—and the Ottawa Car Company. The home was constructed on the Soper family's cottage property. In homage to one of his favorite novels, Lorna Doone, Soper named the property "Lornado", a name it has kept to this day.

The United States government purchased the property in 1935 from the Soper family. From 1935 to 1938, the mansion was slightly modified by the United States Department of State, but it still retains many of its Edwardian influences. Despite modernization and refurbishing projects over the years, the interior of Lornado has kept its architectural integrity and much of its original decor. The home still uses some of its original heirloom furnishings and features original artwork on loan from American artists.

The 32-room, 2 1/2-story limestone building commands a central place on the grounds of the property, which encompasses ten acres of land. The property includes manicured lawns and landscaped gardens, a greenhouse, maintenance buildings, and a gatehouse. Ornamental shelters located below Lornado and several other houses along the Rockcliffe Park Driveway testify to Soper's company's streetcar line, which once traveled this route. Access to the home is via Rockcliffe Road, a restricted access road guarded by the Royal Canadian Mounted Police. Another entrance at Manor Avenue is off limits.

The house is located amongst several other diplomatic residences, and it is walking distance to Rideau Hall, the official residence of the Governor General of Canada. Lornado is surrounded by a wall of trees and located above Rockcliffe Park, next to a parkway alongside the Ottawa River. Lornado was the first diplomatic residence to be established in Rockcliffe Park, and it has since been joined by numerous diplomatic residences, including that of the Holy See.

Over the years, many distinguished Americans and Canadians have been guests at Lornado. The list includes many U.S. presidents and all Canadian prime ministers since 1935. American and Canadian visitors have included students, trade delegations, military officers, state governors, congressmen, diplomats, entrepreneurs, academics, bankers, artists, industrialists, educators, and U.S. and Canadian government officials.

Lornado is the venue for the American ambassador's annual 4th of July celebration, when guests (including embassy staff, their families, and other invited persons) enjoy the spectacular grounds and sophisticated cuisine, mark the anniversary of 1776, hear the anthems of both countries, and witness the U.S. Marine Guards perform their flag drill, the Presentation of the Colors.

== See also ==
- 190 Coltrin Road – Rockcliffe Park home of the Pakistani high commissioner to Canada
- Australia House – home to the Australian high commissioner in Ottawa
- Earnscliffe – home to the British high commissioner in Canada
