= David L. Cohen =

American lawyer (born 1955)

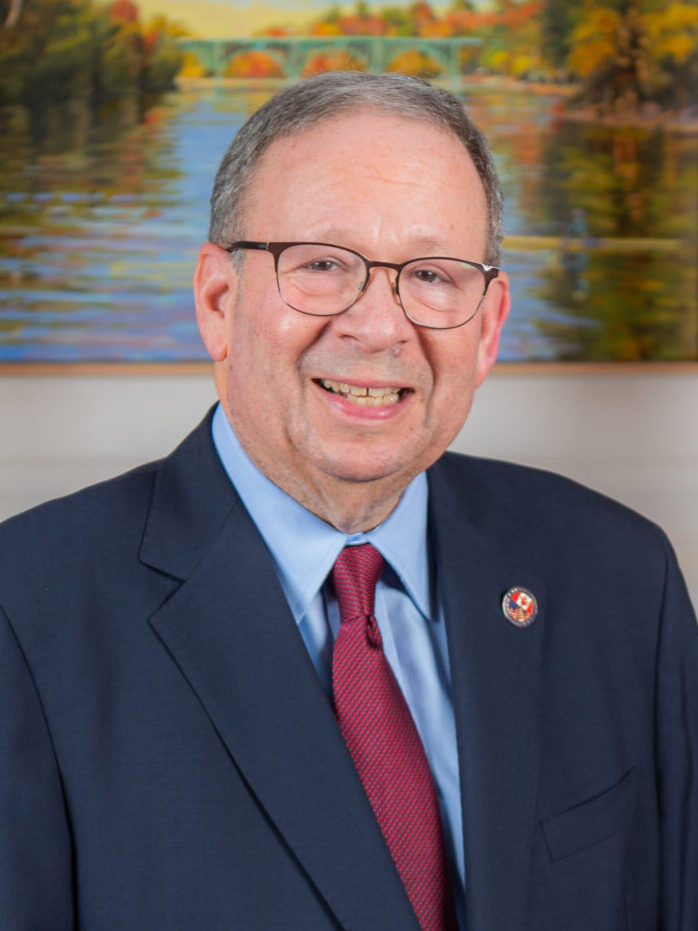

United States Ambassador to Canada
- In office December 7, 2021 – January 20, 2025
- President: Joe Biden
- Preceded by: Kelly Craft
- Succeeded by: Pete Hoekstra

Personal details
- Born: 1955 (age 70–71) New York City, New York, U.S.
- Party: Democratic
- Children: 2
- Education: Swarthmore College (BA); University of Pennsylvania (JD)

David L. Cohen (born 1955) is an American businessman, attorney, lobbyist, and diplomat who served as United States ambassador to Canada from 2021 to 2025. He previously served as the senior advisor to the CEO of Comcast Corporation. Until January 1, 2020, he was senior executive vice president and chief lobbyist for Comcast. He also served as chairman of the board of trustees for the University of Pennsylvania and was chief of staff to former Philadelphia Mayor Ed Rendell.

== Early life and education ==
Born to a Jewish family in New York, Cohen graduated from Swarthmore College in 1977, where he triple-majored in political science, history, and economics. In 1981, he graduated with a J.D. from the University of Pennsylvania Law School.

== Career ==
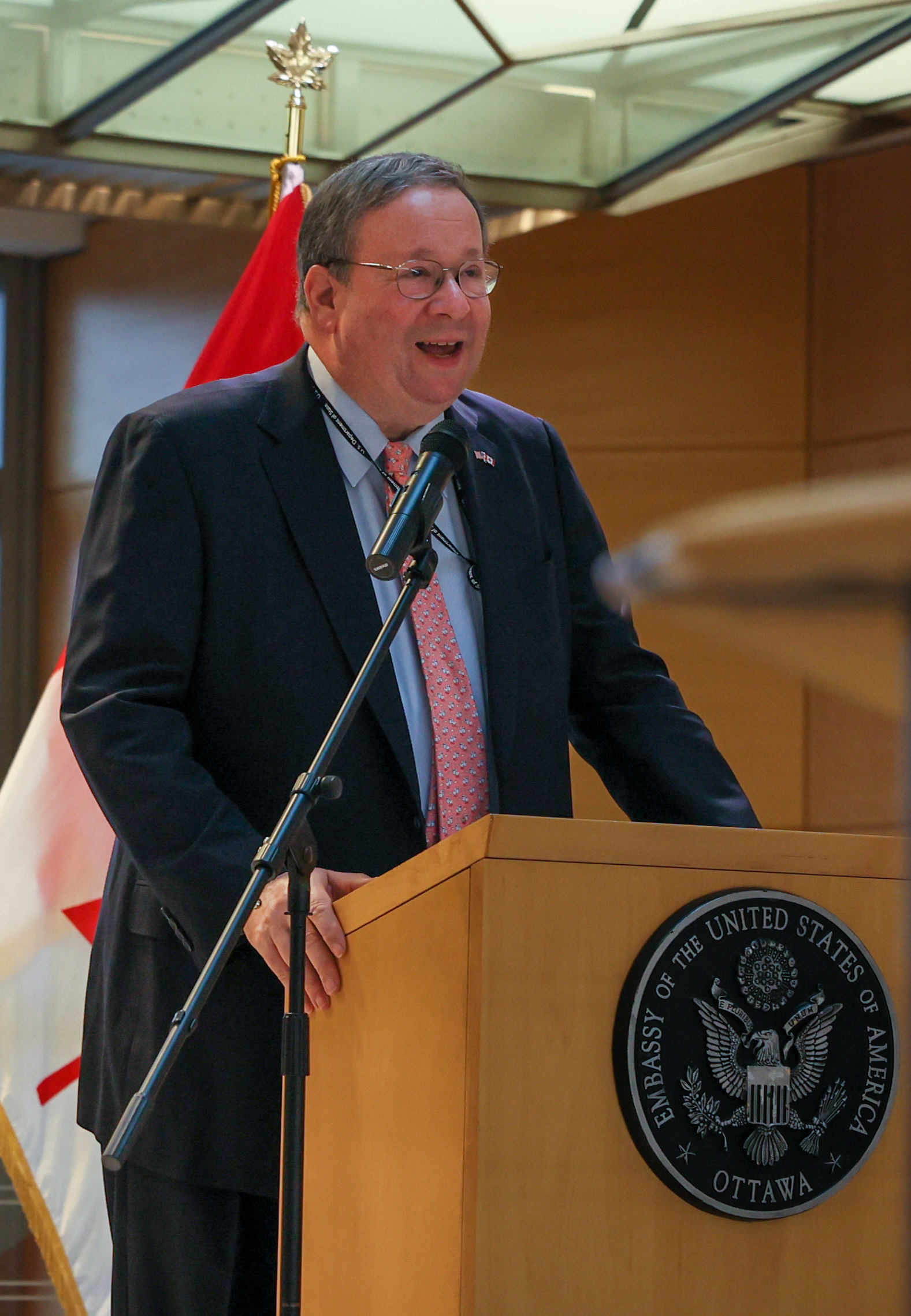
Cohen addresses US embassy staff in Ottawa, 2021

Cohen served as chief of staff to Philadelphia Mayor Ed Rendell, from January 1992 to April 1997. According to a 2021 article in The Philadelphia Inquirer, during his time as chief of staff, Cohen was "famous for reining in unions representing city workers during Philadelphia's bankruptcy in 1992". In 1998, he served as the chief negotiator for SEPTA during a 40-day labor strike conducted by the Transport Workers Union of America. He was a partner in Ballard, Spahr, Andrews & Ingersoll. In July 2002, he became EVP of Comcast Corporation, dealing with corporate communications, government affairs, public affairs, corporate administration, and serving as senior counsel to the CEO.

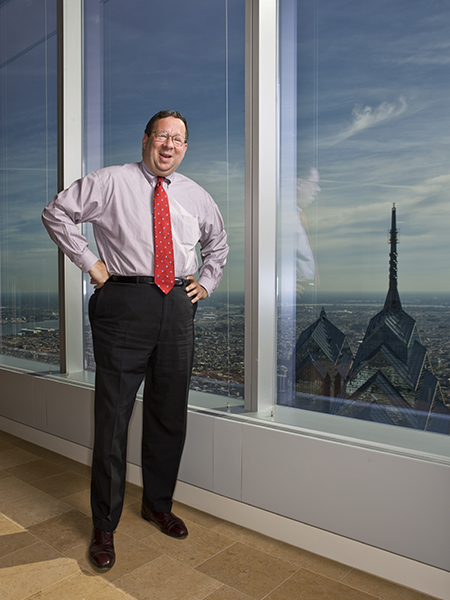
Cohen in 2008

He was named to the PoliticsPA "Power 50" list of politically influential individuals in 2002 and 2003. The Pennsylvania Report named him to the 2003 "The Pennsylvania Report Power 75" list of influential figures in Pennsylvania politics, noting that "No one–in or out of government–is closer to Ed Rendell than Cohen." In 2009, he was included in "The Pennsylvania Report 100" list of influential figures in state politics, noting him as "one Philadelphian that all statewide Dems should know." In 2010, Politics Magazine named him one of the "Top 10 Democrats" in Pennsylvania. Philadelphia magazine listed him as the third-most powerful person in Philadelphia and the top "Connector", whose "influence knows no limits", in its 75 Most Influential People Right Now list in 2014.

In February 2013, Cohen endorsed Republican Governor Tom Corbett's failed re-election bid.

=== Ambassador to Canada ===
On July 21, 2021, President Joe Biden announced his intent to nominate Cohen as the United States ambassador to Canada. Hearings on his nomination were held before the Senate Foreign Relations Committee on September 22, 2021. The committee favorably reported his nomination to the Senate floor on October 19, 2021. Cohen was officially confirmed by the Senate in a voice vote on November 2, 2021.

Cohen was sworn in by Vice President Kamala Harris on December 1, 2021. On December 7, 2021, he presented his credentials to Governor General Mary Simon.

Diplomatic posts
Preceded by Kelly Craft	United States Ambassador to Canada; 2021–2025	Succeeded by Pete Hoekstra
