= The Miami Valley School =

Location
- 5151 Denise Drive; Dayton, Ohio; United States; 39.673693°N 84.180121°W

Information
- Type: Private, independent college preparatory school for grades PreK-12
- Established: 1964
- Category: Private, independent
- Headmaster: David Long
- Grades: Pre-K through 12th
- Enrollment: Approx. 480
- Campus: Suburban
- Colors: Red and Blue
- Athletics: Metro Buckeye Conference
- Mascot: Rams
- Accreditation: Independent School Association of the Central States
- Website: mvschool.com

The Miami Valley School (MVS) is a private, independent day school for grades Pre-K through 12 located in Dayton, Ohio. The school was founded in 1964. The Miami Valley School is a non-profit organization and is accredited by the Independent Schools Association of the Central States. It is also a member of the Ohio Association of Independent Schools (OAIS) and the National Association of Independent Schools. The school serves approximately 480 students across all grades.

The school consists of four divisions. The Early Childhood School includes two preschool grades, called EC1 and EC2. The kindergarten through 5th grade unit is called the Lower School, instead of the more common elementary school. The 6th through 8th-grade academic unit has the traditional Middle School title. The 9th through 12th grade unit is called the Upper School, instead of the more common high school.

== History ==
=== The Marti School (1956–1964) ===
The Miami Valley School was founded in 1964 as a successor to The Marti School, a small farm school founded in 1947 by Dr. Fritz and Gertrude Marti in Lower Salem, Ohio, which moved to Dayton in 1956 at the behest of a collective of Dayton families interested in building the city's first private school. The Mead family, particularly Mr. and Mrs. Harry Talbott Mead, were instrumental in bringing the Martis to Dayton. The Dayton campus of The Marti School was situated on the grounds of a former residence on Munger Road, with a campus totaling just over seven acres. The Marti School's largest student enrollment was 70 pupils, in 1962–63.

Financial difficulties, as well as Fritz Marti's return to full-time work as a university professor at the University of Dayton and Antioch College, led the school's trustees to consider new leadership, expanded facilities and enrollment, and a new model for the school. The decision was made to relocate the campus to a 17-acre portion of farmland donated by the Mead family, which would become the school's current campus at 5151 Denise Drive. The board also announced it would begin the search for a new headmaster, and that the school would be renamed The Miami Valley School. While MVS would initially open on at the Munger Road campus of The Marti School site, and the board of trustees and faculty would remain virtually intact, The Marti School "ceased to exist when MVS was born," according to author Barbara A. Cleary. Today, the school lists its official founding date as 1964.

=== The Miami Valley School (1964–present) ===
==== Headmaster Ted Truslow (1964–1972) ====
The search for The Miami Valley School's first headmaster resulted in the hiring of Walter "Ted" Truslow, who relocated to Dayton from Lake Forest Academy in Illinois. The school's reorganization also prompted a temporary dissolution of the upper school (grades 9–12). The school's enrollment reached 170 students in 1966, which was the first year operations moved to the Denise Drive campus. Truslow left MVS in 1972 to become the head of The Park School in Buffalo, New York, and later Vermont Academy.

==== Headmaster Robert Fatherley (1972–1979) ====
In 1972, Robert Fatherley was hired from Friends Academy in Glen Cove, New York, to assume the headship of MVS. One of the first projects completed under his tenure was the expansion of the school's campus to hold the school's growing population, which once again spanned grades K-12. The school held its first graduation ceremony in 1974. Fatherley's tenure also saw the launch of the Immersion Program in 1974, which began as a program during the month of March for students to study either French or Spanish from a cohort of native speakers. Eventually, the Immersion program would shed its association with language learning and develop into an experiential learning program where students take one intensive course in an academic discipline of their choice for one month. In 1973, the school became fully accredited by the Independent Schools Association of the Central States after attaining a preliminary accreditation in 1964. Fatherley would leave the school in 1979 to assume the headship of Wilmington Friends School in Delaware.

==== Headmaster Duncan Alling (1979–1986) ====
Duncan Alling, Fatherley's successor, was hired from Tandem School (now Tandem Friends) in Charlottesville, Virginia, where he was the cofounder and assistant head. His early tenure was marked by a variety of changes in the administration of the school, during which the school's first Director of Development, Director of Admissions, and Alumni Relations Coordinator were named. Alling also hired 20 new faculty members and embarked on a vigorous outreach campaign to communicate the school's identity beyond its immediate constituencies.

By 1982–1983, MVS' enrollment was 334 students. Alling left MVS in 1986 to become the head of Princeton Country Day School. Director of Admissions and Development Tom Brereton was asked to serve as acting head of school until a permanent headmaster could be hired. In December 1986, Brereton was offered the role on a permanent basis. He would become The Miami Valley School's longest-serving headmaster, with a tenure of 20 years.

==== Headmaster Tom Brereton (1986–2006) ====
In 1994, the school crossed the 400-student mark for the first time, with 409 students in grades Pre-K through 12. Campus expansions during Brereton's tenure included the construction of the Ervin J. Nutter Science Wing in 1995 and the renovation of the middle school wing in 1992. This corresponded with the introduction of "middle school" as a separate division of MVS, comprising grades 6–8. Prior to 1992, the "lower school" was grades K-6, and "upper school" was grades 7–12. Student enrollment reached 502 students in 2004.

In 2006, Brereton left MVS for National Cathedral School in Washington, DC. He would go on to serve as headmaster of The Galloway School in Atlanta and Episcopal Day School in Pinehurst, North Carolina.

==== Headmaster Peter Benedict (2006–2013) ====
Peter Benedict II was hired as MVS' fifth Head of School from Louisville Collegiate School, where he had served as a middle school head. Benedict's first major task would be leading MVS through the economic downturn of the 2008 financial crisis, which saw many major employers (including NCR Corporation and General Motors) move operations away from Dayton. During Benedict's tenure, he introduced MVS' Mandarin language program, which joined French and Spanish as World Language options. MVS also established a sister-school relationship with Nanjing Foreign Language School in China as well as the Second Foreign Language School of Shenzhen. While MVS had welcomed individual international students since the 1970s through AFS intercultural programs, this sister-school relationship led to the first multi-student cohort of international students enrolling at MVS. Peter Benedict departed MVS in 2013 to assume the headship of Saint Andrew's School in Boca Raton, FL. Jason "Jay" Scheurle was brought on as MVS' sixth Head of School. Benedict was later terminated from St. Andrew's School in Boca Raton. Following Benedict's firing, the school retained a law firm to investigate whether any children had been sexually abused. Benedict later filed a defamation lawsuit, which was partially dismissed on summary judgment and ultimately withdrawn by Benedict himself.

==== Head of School Jay Scheurle (2013–2018) ====
Jay Scheurle, formerly Head of School at Chesapeake Academy in Maryland, assumed MVS' headship in 2013. Major developments during Scheurle's tenure involved an emphasis on codifying and describing the school's signature pedagogy, the Immersion Method. Scheurle's tenure was marked by controversy, including allegations that he disproportionately disciplined students based on unsubstantiated social rumors rather than verified conduct violations. His leadership style drew criticism from students, parents, and alumni, and he departed MVS at the end of the 2018 school year. Former students have alleged that disciplinary actions under Scheurle disproportionately targeted students perceived as socially or politically conservative, often based on peer rumors rather than substantiated evidence.

==== Head of School Elizabeth Cleary (2018–2023) ====
Elizabeth Cleary was installed as MVS' seventh Head of School in 2018, becoming the first woman to hold the position. In August 2022, Cleary announced that she would leave MVS at the end of the academic year. In December 2022, the school's board of trustees announced that David Long, currently of The Galloway School, would take over as MVS' Head of School for the 2023–2024 school year.

==== Head of School David Long (2023–present) ====
David Long became Miami Valley School's eighth Head of School in 2023 and was selected by the MVS Board of Trustees.

== Athletics ==
The Miami Valley School competes in the Metro Buckeye Conference. MVS currently fields boys' and girls' teams in the following varsity sports:

- Basketball
- Cross country
- Golf
- Soccer
- Swimming
- Tennis
- Track & field

MVS has won Metro Buckeye Conference championships in the following sports (asterisk denotes shared title):

- Girls' basketball: 2011, 2012, 2013, 2014, 2015, 2016, 2017
- Girls' cross country: 2018
- Boys' golf: 2005, 2006, 2007, 2008, 2009, 2010, 2013
- Boys' soccer: 2000, 2004, 2005, 2009, 2010
- Girls' soccer: 2001, 2002, 2004, 2010*, 2016*
- Girls' softball: 2003, 2005
- Boys' swimming: 2012*, 2013
- Girls' swimming: 2011, 2014
- Boys' tennis: 2010, 2011, 2013, 2016, 2017, 2018, 2019, 2021*, 2022*
- Girls' track: 2007, 2008, 2009, 2010, 2011

Boys basketball* 2024 conference champions

MVS is a member of the Ohio High School Athletic Association (OHSAA). The following MVS athletes have won OHSAA state championships:

- Eugene Hagan: boys' tennis, Class A-AA singles (1981)
- Kathy Mobley: girls' track & field, Class A, 100-meter dash (1980), 200-meter dash (1981)
- Daniel Kolodzik: boys' wrestling, Division III, 103 lbs. (2005), 125 lbs. (2007)
- Shelby Carpenter, Elaina Cromer, Caitlin Pohl, Lauren Shaver: girls' track & field, Division III, 4x400 relay (2010)
- Matthew Kolodzik: boys' wrestling, Division III, 106 lbs. (2012)
- Taylor Middleton: girls' track & field, Division III, 100-meter dash (2015, 2016), 200-meter dash (2015, 2016), long jump (2015, 2016)

The school's athletic facilities include two basketball gymnasiums, grass and artificial turf soccer fields, and six tennis courts.

== Notable alumni ==
- Daniel Beaty (1994) — poet, playwright, and actor
- Cameron Porter (2011) — Former Pro Soccer Player
- Stefan Cleveland (2012) — MLS goalkeeper
- Bruce Heyman (1975) — former U.S. Ambassador to Canada

== Scandals and controversies ==
In 2016, an investigation revealed "dozens of reports of inappropriate behavior by fired teacher and tennis coach Vin Romeo." The teacher was accused of having sexual relations with a student when the child was a minor. Vin Romeo denied the allegations, with an attorney representing Romeo calling the allegations "ludicrously false." Some parents at the school also opposed the firing of Romeo and released a statement stating "We would like to express our dissatisfaction with the performance of not only the headmaster but the present board members too. We find the board to be totally out of touch and not truly aware of what has been going on at our school. We have the most wonderful community at MVS, a community that has been slowly destroyed under the hands of our headmaster with the support of the board. Many of our good teachers have already left since the arrival of our headmaster and many more are planning to leave. We have lost over 10 members of our best staff. He does not understand what our school community is about and is taking it in a direction that does not fit in within our long, wonderful culture."

== Allegations of Jewish Influence/Favoritism ==
Starting in 2009, "the Sinai Scholars program established a Judaic studies track at The Miami Valley School, a goal of its founders was to prepare Jewish high school students to defend Judaism and Israel against negative attacks when they would go to college." Jewish students often receive the perk of free tuition courtesy of the Sinai Scholars program. Non-Jewish individuals often have to go through a rigorous testing process, submit letters of recommendation from their previous school and also go through an interview process to gain acceptance to The Miami Valley School. Scores often influence the amount of tuition a family pays. Higher scores equates to reduced tuition whereas lower scores often mean full tuition, if the threshold is not met. Full tuition cost for K-12 ranges from $22,900 – $28,500.

The Miami Valley School also gives holiday for most Jewish holidays exclusively and does not consider other faith's religious days. If they are considered, at best it is referenced during morning announcements. Followed by a skit performed by a student or a group of, demonstrating the religious holiday and its significance.

In 2019, another controversy arose at The Miami Valley School. A Palestinian student created a presentation that implied that Israel didn't have a right to exist and that the entirety of Israel was "stolen land." Rabbi Nochum Mangel described the poster as "blatant anti-Semitism." Jewish Federation of Greater Dayton CEO Cathy Gardner described the poster as "deeply distressing."
