= List of ambassadors of the United States to Canada =

Ambassador of the United States to Canada
- Ambassadeur des États-Unis au Canada
- Seal of the United States Department of State

- Flag of a United States ambassador

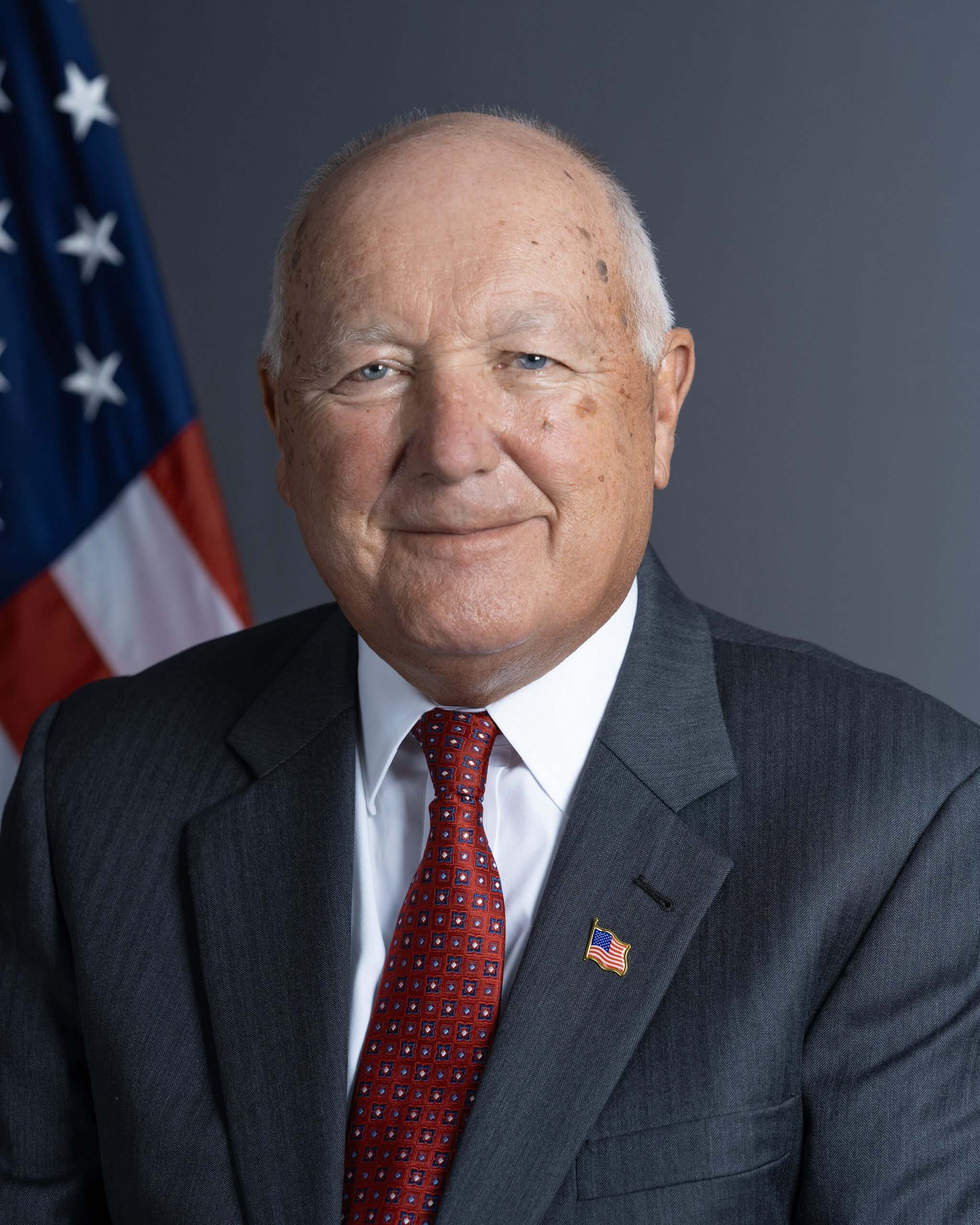
- Incumbent; Pete Hoekstra since April 29, 2025
- United States Department of State
- Reports to: United States Secretary of State
- Residence: Lornado
- Seat: Embassy of the United States; Ottawa, Ontario, Canada
- Appointer: President of the United States with Senate advice and consent
- Term length: At the pleasure of the president
- Inaugural holder: William Phillips (as Envoy Extraordinary and Minister Plenipotentiary)
- Formation: June 1, 1927 (99 years ago)
- Website: U.S. Embassy – Ottawa

This is a list of ambassadors of the United States to Canada. The ambassador is the head of the Embassy of the United States in Ottawa.

Prior to 1943, the head of the U.S. diplomatic mission to Canada bore the title of Envoy Extraordinary and Minister Plenipotentiary. The U.S. mission to Canada was upgraded from legation to embassy status in June 1943; Ray Atherton was the first chief of mission to hold ambassadorial rank.

== List ==
| # | Ambassador | Portrait | Took office | Left office | President(s) |
|---|---|---|---|---|---|
| 1 | William Phillips | | June 1, 1927 | December 14, 1929 | Calvin Coolidge, Herbert Hoover |
| 2 | Hanford MacNider | | August 29, 1930 | August 15, 1932 | Herbert Hoover |
| 3 | Warren Delano Robbins | | May 16, 1933 | March 28, 1935 | Franklin D. Roosevelt |
| 4 | Norman Armour | | August 7, 1935 | January 15, 1939 | Franklin D. Roosevelt |
| 5 | Daniel Calhoun Roper | | May 19, 1939 | August 20, 1939 | Franklin D. Roosevelt |
| 6 | James H. R. Cromwell | | January 24, 1940 | May 16, 1940 | Franklin D. Roosevelt |
| 7 | Jay Pierrepont Moffat | | June 13, 1940 | January 24, 1943 | Franklin D. Roosevelt |
| 8 | Ray Atherton | | August 3, 1943 | August 30, 1948 | Franklin D. Roosevelt, Harry S. Truman |
| 9 | Laurence Steinhardt | | November 1, 1949 | March 28, 1950 | Harry S. Truman |
| 10 | Stanley Woodward | | June 22, 1950 | January 14, 1953 | Harry S. Truman |
| 11 | R. Douglas Stuart | | July 15, 1953 | May 4, 1956 | Dwight D. Eisenhower |
| 12 | Livingston T. Merchant | | May 23, 1956 | November 6, 1958 | Dwight D. Eisenhower |
| 13 | Richard B. Wigglesworth | | December 15, 1958 | October 19, 1960 | Dwight D. Eisenhower |
| 14 | Livingston T. Merchant | | March 15, 1961 | May 26, 1962 | John F. Kennedy |
| 15 | William Walton Butterworth | | December 11, 1962 | September 10, 1968 | John F. Kennedy, Lyndon B. Johnson |
| 16 | Harold F. Linder | | September 10, 1968 | July 9, 1969 | Lyndon B. Johnson, Richard M. Nixon |
| 17 | Adolph W. Schmidt | | September 11, 1969 | January 29, 1974 | Richard M. Nixon |
| 18 | William J. Porter | | March 13, 1974 | December 16, 1975 | Richard M. Nixon, Gerald R. Ford |
| 19 | Thomas O. Enders | | February 17, 1976 | September 14, 1979 | Gerald R. Ford, Jimmy Carter |
| 20 | Kenneth M. Curtis | | October 5, 1979 | January 20, 1981 | Jimmy Carter |
| 21 | Paul H. Robinson, Jr. | | July 15, 1981 | September 9, 1985 | Ronald Reagan |
| 22 | Thomas M. T. Niles | | September 10, 1985 | June 28, 1989 | Ronald Reagan, George H. W. Bush |
| 23 | Edward N. Ney | | June 30, 1989 | June 20, 1992 | George H. W. Bush |
| 24 | Peter Teeley | | July 3, 1992 | February 28, 1993 | George H. W. Bush, Bill Clinton |
| 25 | James Blanchard | | August 19, 1993 | March 15, 1996 | Bill Clinton |
| 26 | Gordon Giffin | | September 17, 1997 | April 10, 2001 | Bill Clinton, George W. Bush |
| 27 | Paul Cellucci | | April 17, 2001 | March 18, 2005 | George W. Bush |
| 28 | David Wilkins | | June 29, 2005 | January 20, 2009 | George W. Bush |
| 29 | David Jacobson | | October 2, 2009 | July 15, 2013 | Barack Obama |
| 30 | Bruce Heyman | | March 26, 2014 | January 18, 2017 | Barack Obama |
| — | Elizabeth Moore Aubin (acting) | | January 18, 2017 | October 23, 2017 | Barack Obama, Donald Trump |
| 31 | Kelly Craft | | October 23, 2017 | August 23, 2019 | Donald Trump |
| — | Richard M. Mills Jr. (acting) | | August 23, 2019 | November 9, 2020 | Donald Trump |
| — | Katherine Brucker (acting) | | November 9, 2020 | May 28, 2021 | Donald Trump, Joe Biden |
| — | Arnold A. Chacón (acting) | | May 28, 2021 | December 7, 2021 | Joe Biden |
| 32 | David L. Cohen | | December 7, 2021 | January 20, 2025 | Joe Biden |
| — | Marybeth Turner (acting) | | January 20, 2025 | April 28, 2025 | Donald Trump |
| 33 | Pete Hoekstra | | April 29, 2025 | Incumbent | Donald Trump |

== See also ==
- Ambassadors of the United States
- Canada–United States relations
- Embassy of the United States, Ottawa
- Foreign relations of Canada
- List of ambassadors of Canada to the United States
- Lornado, official residence of the US Ambassador to Canada
