= Kelly Craft =

American businesswoman and diplomat (born 1962)

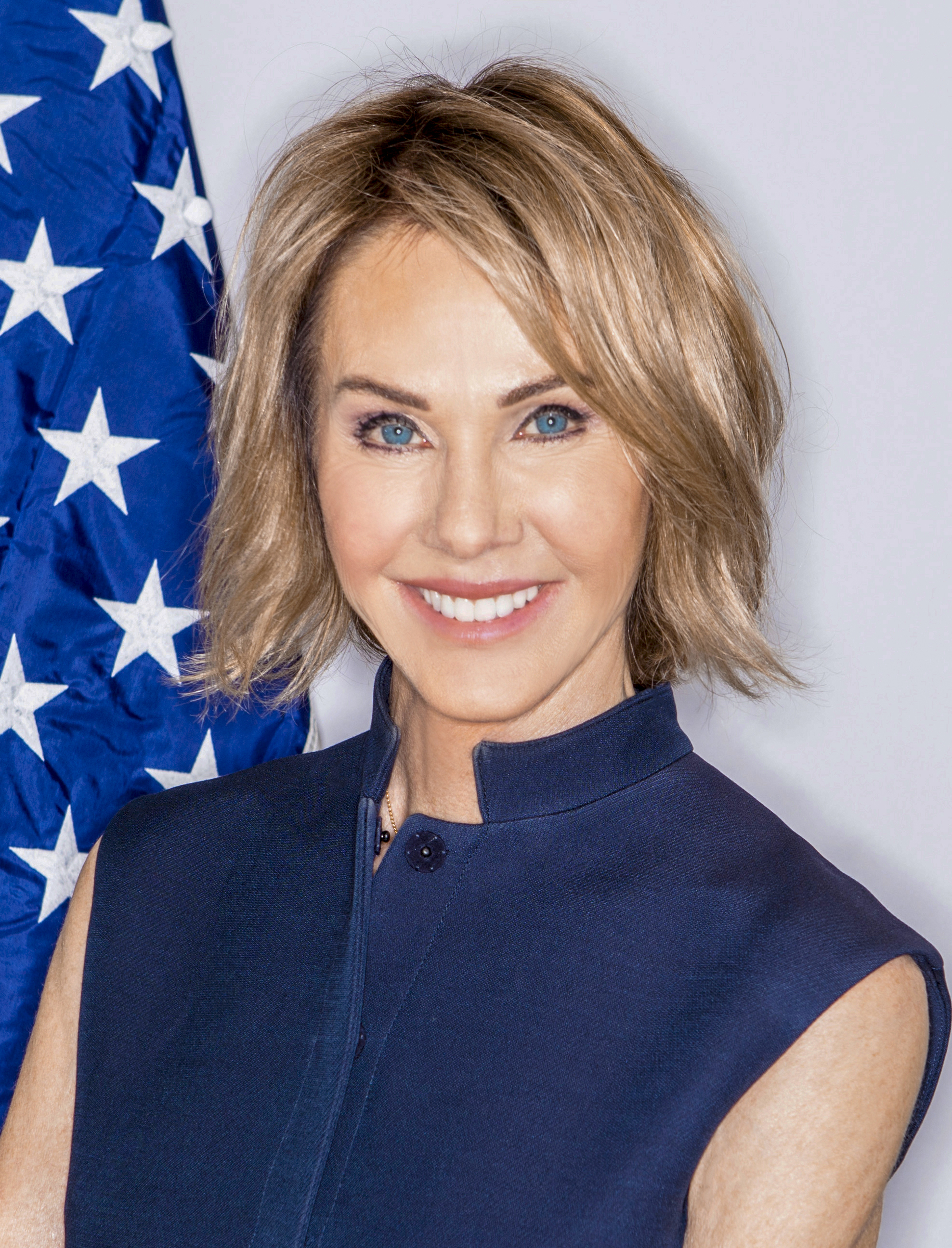
- Official portrait, 2019

30th United States Ambassador to the United Nations
- In office September 12, 2019 – January 20, 2021
- President: Donald Trump
- Deputy: Jonathan Cohen; Richard M. Mills Jr.
- Preceded by: Nikki Haley
- Succeeded by: Linda Thomas-Greenfield

United States Ambassador to Canada
- In office October 23, 2017 – August 23, 2019
- President: Donald Trump
- Deputy: Richard M. Mills Jr.
- Preceded by: Bruce Heyman
- Succeeded by: David L. Cohen

Personal details
- Born: Kelly Dawn Guilfoil; February 24, 1962 (age 64) Lexington, Kentucky, U.S.
- Party: Republican
- Spouses: David Moross (m. 1986, divorced); Judson Knight (m. 1992, divorced); Joe Craft (m. 2016)
- Children: 2 daughters
- Education: University of Kentucky (BA)

Kelly Dawn Craft (née Guilfoil; born February 24, 1962) is an American businesswoman, politician, and former diplomat who served as the 30th United States ambassador to the United Nations from 2019 to 2021 under President Donald Trump. She was confirmed as the U.S. ambassador to the United Nations by the US Senate by a vote of 56–34, and was officially sworn in September 2019.

She previously served as the 31st United States ambassador to Canada from 2017 to 2019, the first woman to hold the office. Craft was previously the U.S. alternate delegate to the United Nations from 2007 to 2008, where her focus included U.S. engagement in Africa.

Craft heads Kelly G. Knight LLC, a business advisory firm based in Lexington, Kentucky, and serves on the advisory board of the Canadian American Business Council. She ran in the Republican primary for the 2023 Kentucky gubernatorial election, but lost to state attorney general Daniel Cameron.

== Early life and education ==
Craft was born in Lexington, Kentucky, a daughter of the late Bobby Guilfoil and Sherry Dale Guilfoil, who both died in 2011. She grew up just outside Glasgow, a small town in rural central Kentucky.

Her father was the town veterinarian in Glasgow, and he farmed and raised cows and horses. He was active in the Democratic Party, and in his later years served as chairman of the Barren County, Kentucky Democratic Party. He was also a deacon of the First Christian Church in Glasgow, and served on the local board of health. Her mother was a home economics teacher at Glasgow High School, a public high school. Her mother sewed the family's clothing, and the house's draperies. She has a younger sister, Micah Guilfoil Payne (a lawyer in Glasgow), and a younger brother, Marc Guilfoil (executive director of the Kentucky Horse Racing Commission).

She grew up in a middle-class family. Craft played clarinet in the high school band at Glasgow High School, and graduated in 1980.

Craft then created her own interdisciplinary major, with an emphasis on international law, at the University of Kentucky in Lexington. She graduated with a B.A. in 1984.

== Consulting firm ==
In 2004, Craft started a marketing, strategic management, leadership advice, and business consulting firm, Kelly G. Knight, LLC. Its principal office is in Lexington. She also serves on the advisory board of the Canadian American Business Council.

== Political involvement and donations; philanthropy ==
Craft was initially active in local politics and civic causes, such as helping the poor, and raising funds for the arts. She has been a generous donor to and supporter of primarily Republican political candidates. In 2004, Craft was a prominent supporter of President George W. Bush's reelection campaign, and co-chaired the Republican National Finance Committee. In 2012 she was the Kentucky finance committee chairwoman for Mitt Romney’s presidential campaign. She also raised money for then-governor Ernie Fletcher, and congressmen Hal Rogers and Ron Lewis.

She is also an influencer in Kentuckian affairs. The Crafts supported then-Senate Majority Leader Mitch McConnell. Craft has also supported both Democratic Kentucky Governor Andy Beshear, and former Kentucky Governor, Republican Matt Bevin.

She was a delegate to the 2016 Republican National Convention from Kentucky. That year, Craft and her husband Joe Craft donated millions of dollars to candidates for the 2016 Republican nomination for president. The couple initially supported Marco Rubio, but in June 2016 moved their support to Donald Trump and contributed more than $2 million to his campaign, in part because he agreed with them in private that he would not replace House Speaker Paul Ryan or Senate Majority Leader Mitch McConnell, whom they supported. Political commentator Scott Jennings said that their support gave Trump instant credibility.

Separate from politics, Craft has been a philanthropist, and the couple has donated to philanthropic causes. In 2015 they co-founded the Craft Academy for Excellence in Science and Mathematics at Kentucky's Morehead State University, a special program for academically exceptional high school students. By 2019 they had committed over $10 million to the academy. They have also donated substantial sums to the University of Kentucky.

Craft served on the University of Kentucky Board of Trustees for a term beginning in August 2016, but resigned to accept the US ambassadorship to Canada a year later. She has also served on the boards of directors of the Salvation Army, the Lexington Philharmonic, the United Way of the Bluegrass, the YMCA of Central Kentucky, the Kentucky Arts Council, and the Center for Rural Development (a nonprofit dedicated to economic development in rural Kentucky).

== U.S. alternate delegate to the United Nations ==
President George W. Bush appointed Craft an alternate delegate to the United Nations in 2007, for the 62nd Session of the General Assembly of the United Nations. On October 24, 2007, Senator Joe Biden reported favorably on her nomination on behalf of the Senate Committee on Foreign Relations. On October 26, she was confirmed by the United States Senate by voice vote.

As part of the US delegation, her responsibilities included advising the US Ambassador to the UN on US engagement in Africa. She also gave a speech to the UN General Assembly on the investment the US and other nations were making to fight HIV/AIDS in Africa and malaria in Africa, and promote development there. She later said: "President Bush’s example and his initiative to cure AIDS on the African continent instilled in me the value of using diplomatic positions to help the less fortunate. And that’s what I am going to do."

== U.S. ambassador to Canada ==
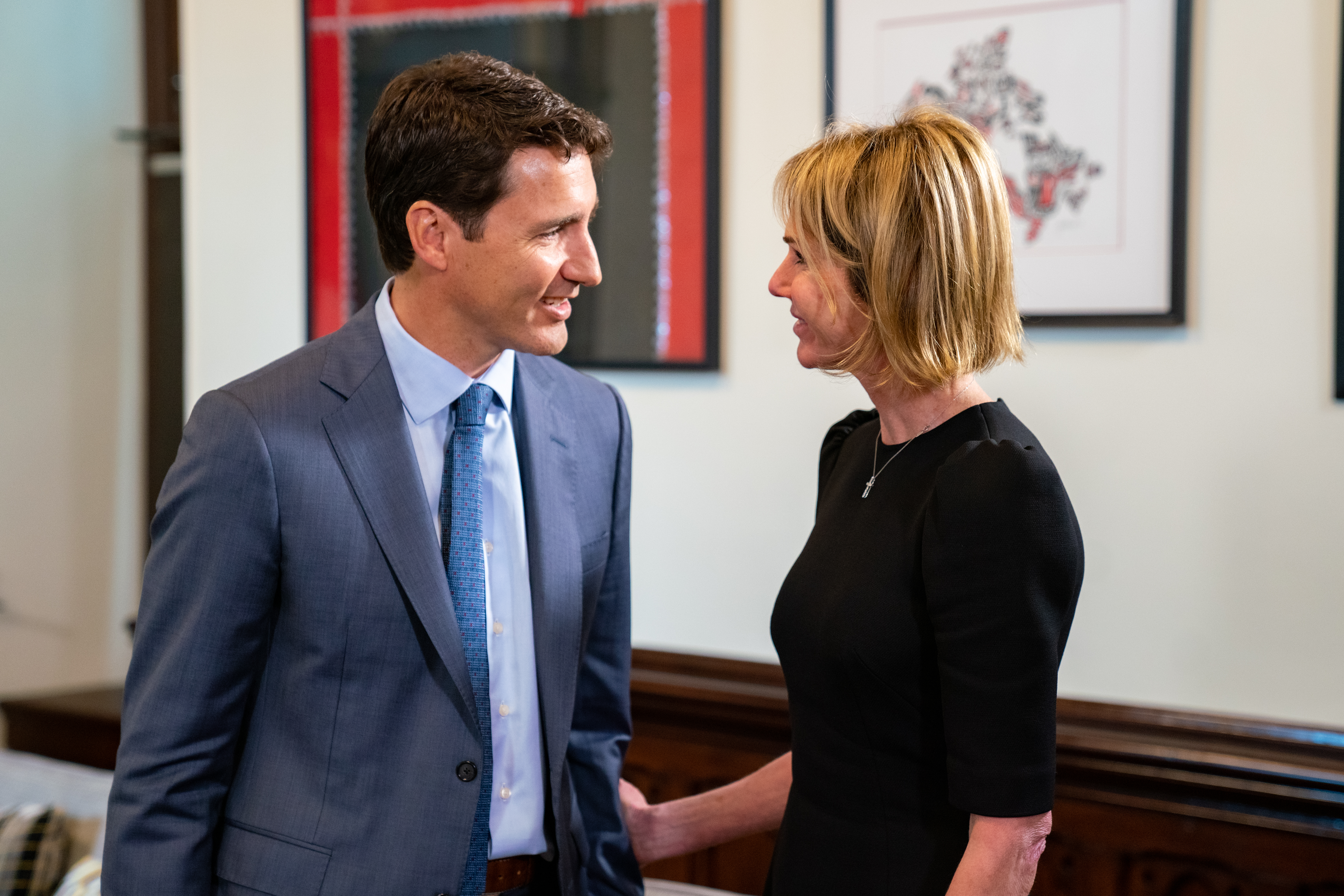
Canadian Prime Minister Justin Trudeau greets US Ambassador Craft in 2019.

On June 15, 2017, Craft was nominated by President Donald Trump to become the US ambassador to Canada, with the support of Senator Mitch McConnell. She was confirmed by the United States Senate by unanimous voice vote on August 3, and assumed office on October 23.

Craft became the 31st United States Ambassador to Canada. She also became the first woman to hold the job. In her first week as ambassador to Canada, Craft said in an interview with CBC News that when it came to climate change she appreciated all of the scientific evidence, and thought that "both sides have their own results, from their studies, and I appreciate and I respect both sides of the science". She played a leadership role in trade negotiations between the US and Canada, resulting in the signing of a major new free trade agreement between the US, Canada, and Mexico (the U.S.-Mexico-Canada Agreement; USMCA), which replaced the North American Free Trade Agreement (NAFTA). Her work in hammering out the tri-lateral agreement raised her stock with the Trump administration. In addition during her tenure the relationship between the countries was the subject of controversial steel tariffs, and critical comments by Trump about the Canadian prime minister. In June 2018, as US-Canadian relations grew testy, an envelope was mailed to her containing a suspicious white powder and a death threat. Canadian columnist L. Ian MacDonald wrote: "[Craft] has been diligent and warm in her representational role. She's perhaps one of a few members of Trump's team who is genuinely blameless in this mess."

According to a June 2019 report in Politico, Craft was frequently away from her Ottawa post during her tenure as ambassador, though the report acknowledged that US State Department officials said that many of her trips were related to the new North American trade agreement. During a 15-month period, she took 128 flights between Ottawa and the United States, equal to a round trip per week. Seventy had Lexington as the origin or destination, which raised questions to some as to whether the trips were for personal reasons. A State Department spokesperson explained, however, that all of Craft's personal and official travel "to and from the United States, including numerous trips associated with USMCA [US-Canada-Mexico trade deal] negotiations, were pre-approved by the State Department and complied with all Department travel guidelines," that the number of her personal absences did not exceed State Department limits, and in addition that Craft chose to cover all her travel expenses from her personal funds, "saving the U.S. government substantial money". Separately, a US official said that Craft was often in Washington for trade negotiations in which she was directly involved, that she would also fly to other places in the United States to promote the trade deal which was one of the president's top priorities, and also explained that Craft would during the course of these travels sometimes spend the weekend at her Kentucky home rather than return to Ottawa, which did not count toward the "26 [work] days" away from her post limitation. Per State Department rules, an ambassador may only spend 26 "work days" away from a post without first obtaining special State Department approval, and she testified that each of her trips was in fact made with State Department approval. The State Department and Craft do not provide records of Craft's schedule and the number of days she was in Ottawa, but the newspaper said she spent 300 days (more than half her term) away from her Ottawa post. Craft herself likewise insisted that all of her trips were taken in accordance with US State Department regulations, and with State Department approval, with much of the time spent negotiating the trade deal with Canada and Mexico in Washington, D.C. She also pledged to the Senate Foreign Relations Committee to deliver to it all of her travel records for her time as U.S. ambassador to Canada. Senator Marco Rubio commented: "I have a sneaking suspicion that having you here (for trade talks) or having you attend a cocktail party at some embassy, we would prefer you would prioritize the trade deal."

Canadian Prime Minister Justin Trudeau thanked Craft for what he said was her "dedication to building on the strong relationship between our two countries," and her help in "securing a new North American trade deal that increases the prosperity of both Canada and the United States". Former Canadian Ambassador to the United States Frank McKenna said that Craft brought "charm and grace and listening skills" to the ambassadorship, and did "the job very well when at the top, the relationship is as bad as it’s ever been". Ontario Premier Doug Ford gave her tenure a positive review, saying "Every premier I know thinks the world of her. She really proved herself over some tough times."

== U.S. ambassador to the United Nations ==
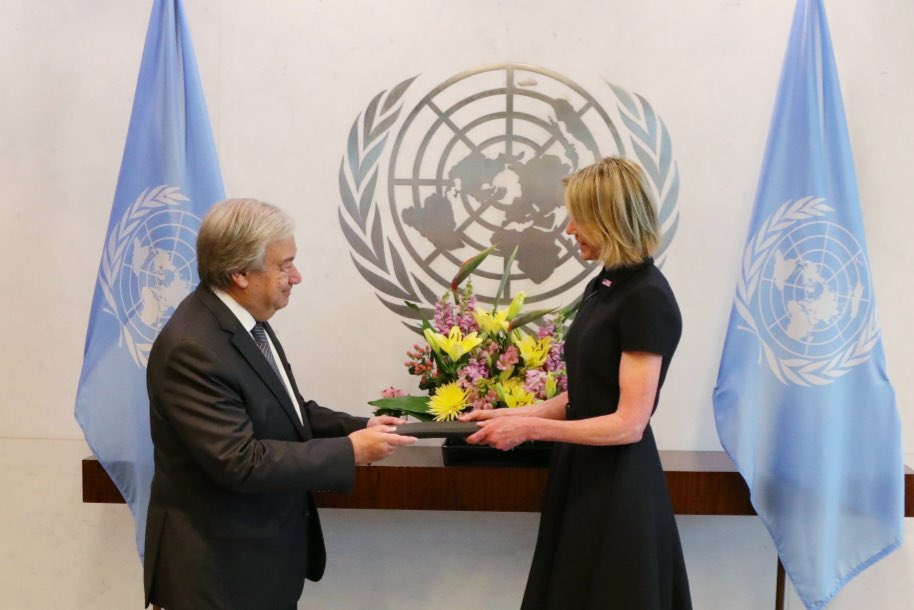
Kelly Craft presents credentials to Secretary-General of the United Nations António Guterres in 2019

On February 22, 2019, Trump announced his intention to nominate Craft to be the next United States Ambassador to the United Nations, replacing Nikki Haley, who had resigned two months prior, after his first replacement choice, Heather Nauert, withdrew herself from consideration. US National Security Advisor John Bolton and US Secretary of State Mike Pompeo both agreed that Craft was qualified and the most logical choice to replace Haley, and Mitch McConnell supported her for the ambassadorship as well. Pompeo said she "has been an outstanding advocate for America's national security and economic interests in Canada and she is extremely well-qualified to do the same at the United Nations". On May 2, 2019, Trump formally sent Craft's nomination to the United States Senate. On June 19, 2019, a hearing on her nomination was held before the US Senate Foreign Relations Committee. During the hearing Craft said "Israel ... is the subject of unrelenting bias and hostility in UN venues. The United States will never accept such bias, and if confirmed I commit to seizing every opportunity to shine a light on this conduct, call it what it is, and demand that these outrageous practices finally come to an end." Although Craft had previously said during her tenure as Ambassador to Canada that she believed there were "good scientists on both sides” of the climate debate, during her confirmation hearing she altered her position, saying that she believed that fossil fuels and human behavior have contributed to climate change. Due to her family's connections to the coal industry, she also said she would recuse herself from any UN discussions involving climate change or coal. On July 25, 2019, her nomination was reported out of committee by a 15–7 vote, with Democratic Senators Jeanne Shaheen, Chris Coons, and Chris Murphy voting for her, as well as all Republicans. On July 30, 2019, the United States Senate invoked cloture on her nomination by a 57–33 vote. On July 31, 2019, her nomination was confirmed by a 56–34 vote.

She was formally sworn in by Vice President Mike Pence on September 10, 2019. Craft formally presented her credentials to UN Secretary-General António Guterres on September 12, 2019, saying: "I come to the United Nations not only as the President's emissary, but also as the voice of America's unwavering commitment to democracy, freedom, human rights, and wherever possible, the peaceful resolution of conflicts."

=== 2019 ===
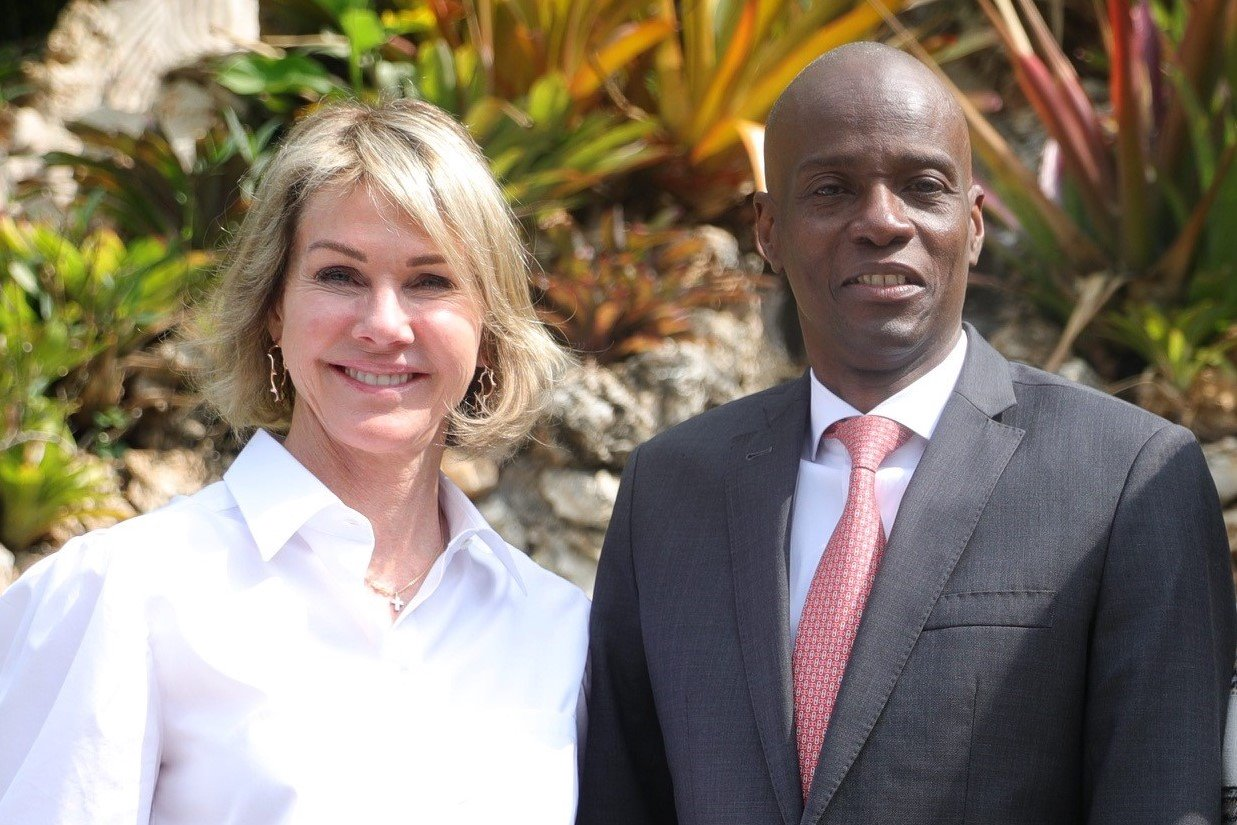
Ambassador Craft and President of Haiti Jovenel Moïse in 2019

When the UN General Assembly voted to add Venezuela to the UN Human Rights Council in October 2019, Craft wrote: "I am personally aggrieved that 105 countries voted in favor of this affront to human life and dignity. It provides ironclad proof that the Human Rights Council is broken, and reinforces why the United States withdrew." She called it "an embarrassment to the United Nations, and a tragedy for the people of Venezuela." Venezuela had been accused of withholding from the Venezuelan people humanitarian aid delivered from other nations, and of manipulating its voters in exchange for food and medical care. The council had been criticized regularly for admitting members who were themselves suspected of human rights violations. The US left the Council in 2018, protesting the Council's frequent denunciations of Israel.

Speaking to the UN Security Council in October 2019, she called Hamas "a terrorist organization that oppresses the Palestinian people in Gaza through intimidation and outright violence, while inciting violence against Israel". She condemned as "despicable" Hamas's violence against its own people, its use of Palestinian children as pawns, and its indiscriminate attacks on Israeli civilian areas, and called it one of the greatest obstacles to resolving the Israeli-Palestinian conflict.

In November 2019, Craft met with President of Haiti Jovenel Moïse at the Haiti National Palace about ways to implement a consensual resolution of Haiti's political crisis through inclusive dialogue. Craft later met with political leaders from other Haitian parties, listened to their different views, and urged an inclusive solution with Moïse. She also urged the Haitian government to fight corruption, investigate and prosecute human rights abusers, and combat narcotics and human trafficking.

That same month, International Crisis Group UN Director Richard Gowan reported that Craft had won credit for attending an unusually high number of routine meetings for an American UN ambassador.

In December 2019, Craft said during a meeting of the UN Security Council that was called at her request that the US was prepared to take "simultaneous steps" with North Korea to achieve peace. But she also warned the North Koreans against conducting further missile tests, noting that North Korean firings of ICBMs "are designed to attack the continental United States with nuclear weapons."

=== 2020 ===
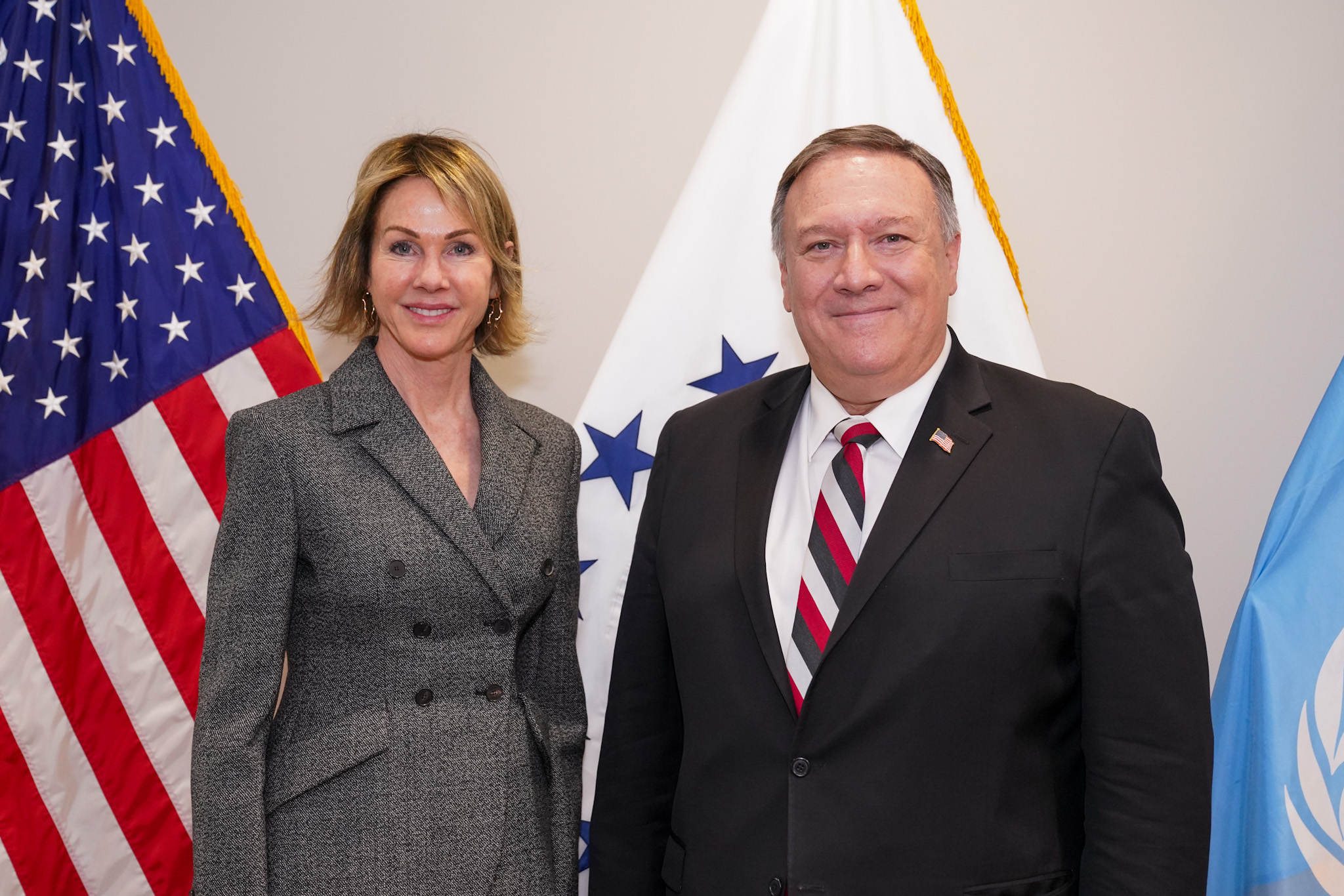
Craft with US Secretary of State Mike Pompeo in 2020

In January 2020, after the US killed Iranian Major General Qasem Soleimani, who had led the Quds Force, in a drone strike, Craft wrote a letter to the UN Security Council in which she said that the act was one of self-defense. At the same time, she wrote in the letter that the US stood "ready to engage without preconditions in serious negotiations with Iran, with the goal of preventing further endangerment of international peace and security or escalation by the Iranian regime".

In May 2020, Craft spoke at a session of the UN Security Council, and said that the Council must ensure that armed groups in Lebanon such as the Islamist Hezbollah are disarmed, and that the role of the UN Interim Force in Lebanon (UNIFIL) is strengthened so that it can effectively investigate Hezbollah's violations. She noted that Hezbollah was dictating where and when UNIFIL could patrol. She also said the US was deeply concerned about Iran's and Syria's transfers of weaponry to Hezbollah.

On August 13, 2020, Craft celebrated the announcement of diplomatic relations between the United Arab Emirates and Israel, calling it “a huge win” for Trump and for the world, saying that the diplomatic ties show “just how hungry for peace we all are in this world,” and saying that Mideast countries understand the need “to stand firm against a regime that is the number one state sponsor of terrorism”—Iran. Trump's senior adviser Jared Kushner, in his 2022 memoir Breaking History, credited Craft with both helping refine an urgently created UN Security Counsel resolution proposal calling for endorsing the Abraham Accords approach — meant to foreclose a concerning competing resolution proposal that had been created to scuttle the US peace plan, and with lobbying all of the US contacts at each UN Security Council member country. This led to Germany, France, the UK, and the Dominican Republic supporting the US proposal, while China, Vietnam, and Niger said they would abstain. The gambit worked, and the anti-Abraham Accords proposal was shelved indefinitely.

Speaking about Iran and the US desire to restore UN s against it and extend an embargo to arms sales to the country in 2020, Craft said: "History is replete of tragedies of appeasing regimes such as this one, that for decades have kept its own people under its thumb. The Trump administration has no fear in standing in limited company on this matter, in light of the unmistakable truth guiding our actions. I only regret that other members of this [Security Council] have lost their way, and now find themselves standing in the company of terrorists." She also wrote a September 20, 2021, letter to the President of the UN Security Council, pressing her point on sanctions. Speaking at the US State Department in September 2020, she said: "As we have in the past, we will stand alone to protect peace and security at all times. We don’t need a cheering section to validate our moral compass."

In mid-September 2020, Craft met with James K.J. Lee, director-general of the Taipei Economic and Cultural Office in New York, for lunch in New York City. He had been secretary-general in Taiwan's Ministry of Foreign Affairs until July. It was unprecedented; the first meeting between a top Taiwan official and a United States Ambassador to the United Nations. Craft said they discussed ways the US can help Taiwan become more engaged within the UN, and she pointed to a December 2019 email early alert from Taiwan that WHO had ignored, which had warned about the danger of the person-to-person transmission of the new highly contagious COVID-19 virus in China. The meeting prompted protests from China.

Later in September 2020, at a UN Security Council meeting to discuss challenges related to “Post-COVID-19 Global Governance,” after her fellow members veered off onto other topics only tangentially related to the virus, Craft criticized them for using a COVID-19 meeting to focus on what she called "political grudges," rather than the pandemic. She said: "You know, shame on each of you. I am astonished and I am disgusted by the content of today’s discussion. I am actually really quite ashamed of this council — members of the council who took this opportunity to focus on political grudges rather than the critical issue at hand."

In October 2020, responding to a Russian question in the Security Council as to how to improve security in the Middle East and the Persian Gulf, Craft said: "Respectfully, I think the solution is much easier. This Council must simply muster the courage to hold Iran responsible to its existing international obligations."

In December 2020 she said that the UN Human Rights Council was "a haven for despots and dictators, hostile to Israel, and ineffectual on true human rights crises". Remarking on China's and Venezuela's human-rights records, she said the Council "includes the voices of the very human-rights violators it was designed to counter". Speaking to the Council's treatment of Israel, Craft said: "We must deal with the insanity at the center of the Human Rights Council's persistent and egregious anti-Israel bias... No other country is targeted in this way — not the murderous Assad regime in Syria, not the disastrous Maduro regime in Venezuela, and not the Chinese Communist Party responsible for abuses; not Russia, Cuba, or North Korea. Israel, only Israel..."

=== 2021 ===
In January 2021, Craft met with Taiwan President Tsai Ing-wen by video link. Craft said: "We discussed the many ways Taiwan is a model for the world, as demonstrated by its success in fighting COVID-19 and all that Taiwan has to offer in the fields of health, technology and cutting-edge science.... the U.S. stands with Taiwan and always will." Speaking in Beijing, Chinese Ministry of Foreign Affairs spokesman Zhao Lijian said: "Certain U.S. politicians will pay a heavy price for their wrong words and deeds." On her last day in office later that month, Craft called Taiwan "a force for good on the global stage — a vibrant democracy, a generous humanitarian actor, a responsible actor in the global health community, and a vigorous promoter and defender of human rights."

On January 20, 2021, days after Craft's call with the Taiwan President — and the last day of the Trump administration — China imposed sanctions against Craft (who, in addition, had sent a letter to the UN secretary general criticizing China's “excessive maritime claims” in the South China Sea), Pompeo, and 26 other former Trump officials. China's ministry said it was imposing the sanctions "for a series of crazy moves that have severely interfered in China's internal affairs, undermined China's interests, offended the Chinese people, and seriously disrupted China-US relations." President Biden's National Security Council called the sanctions "unproductive and cynical".

== 2023 Kentucky gubernatorial campaign ==
From the time that she departed from the Trump administration, there was speculation that Craft would run in the 2023 Kentucky gubernatorial election. Craft declared her candidacy for governor of Kentucky on September 7, 2022. She chose Kentucky state senator Max Wise to be her running mate.

Her campaign focused in part on lowering the state crime rate. In January 2023, she vowed to apply a "full court press" to combat the Chinese Communist Party's alleged contributions to the fentanyl crisis plaguing the United States if she were elected governor of Kentucky. She also said that, if elected, "we will not have transgenders in our school system".

Craft was considered to have a fundraising and monetary advantage over her opponents, as she raised $752,000 within the first three weeks of her campaign, the second-highest Republican fundraising total behind Agriculture Commissioner Ryan Quarles; by the end of 2022 she had taken over the Republican candidates' lead in fundraising. In addition to her fundraising, she lent her campaign $9.2 million. By May, her campaign had spent $5.3 million on advertising. That month, Florida Governor Ron DeSantis endorsed her, as low turnout of 10 percent of voters was expected in the election. Despite raising $8.5 million, she placed third in the Republican primary, behind Kentucky Agriculture Commissioner Ryan Quarles and eventual winner Kentucky Attorney General Daniel Cameron, who was endorsed by former President Donald Trump.

== Personal life ==
Craft married David Moross and then Judson Knight, and has two daughters. She wed Joe Craft in April 2016. A Hazard, Kentucky, native and University of Kentucky College of Law graduate, he is a billionaire coal-mining executive for Alliance Resource Partners, L.P., the second-largest coal producer in the eastern United States. The couple share six children and, as of 2018, 11 grandchildren.

Diplomatic posts
Preceded by Bruce Heyman	United States Ambassador to Canada; 2017–2019	Succeeded by David L. Cohen
Preceded by Nikki Haley	United States Ambassador to the United Nations; 2019–2021	Succeeded by Linda Thomas-Greenfield
