= 2014 United States Senate election in Michigan =

- November 4, 2014
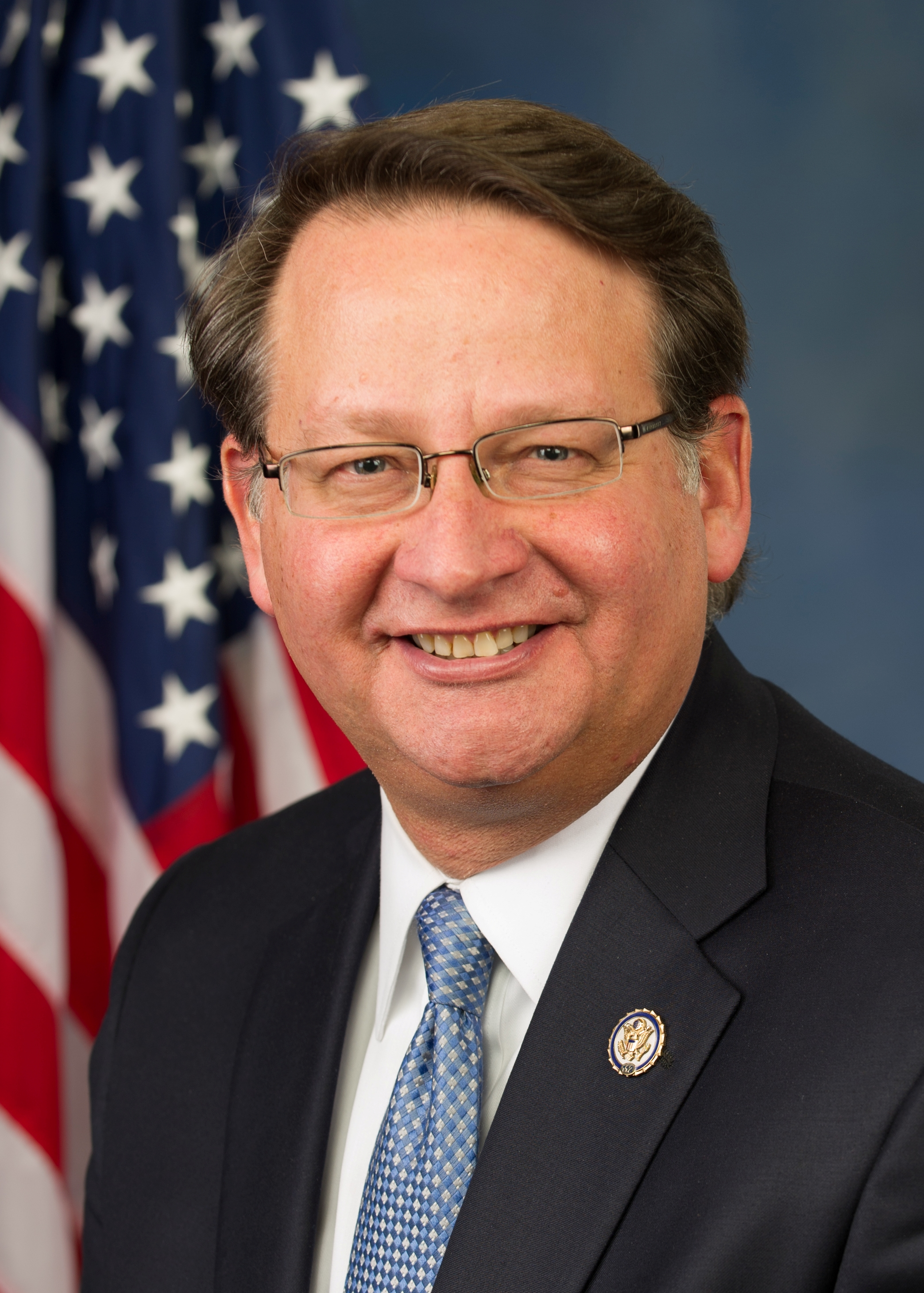

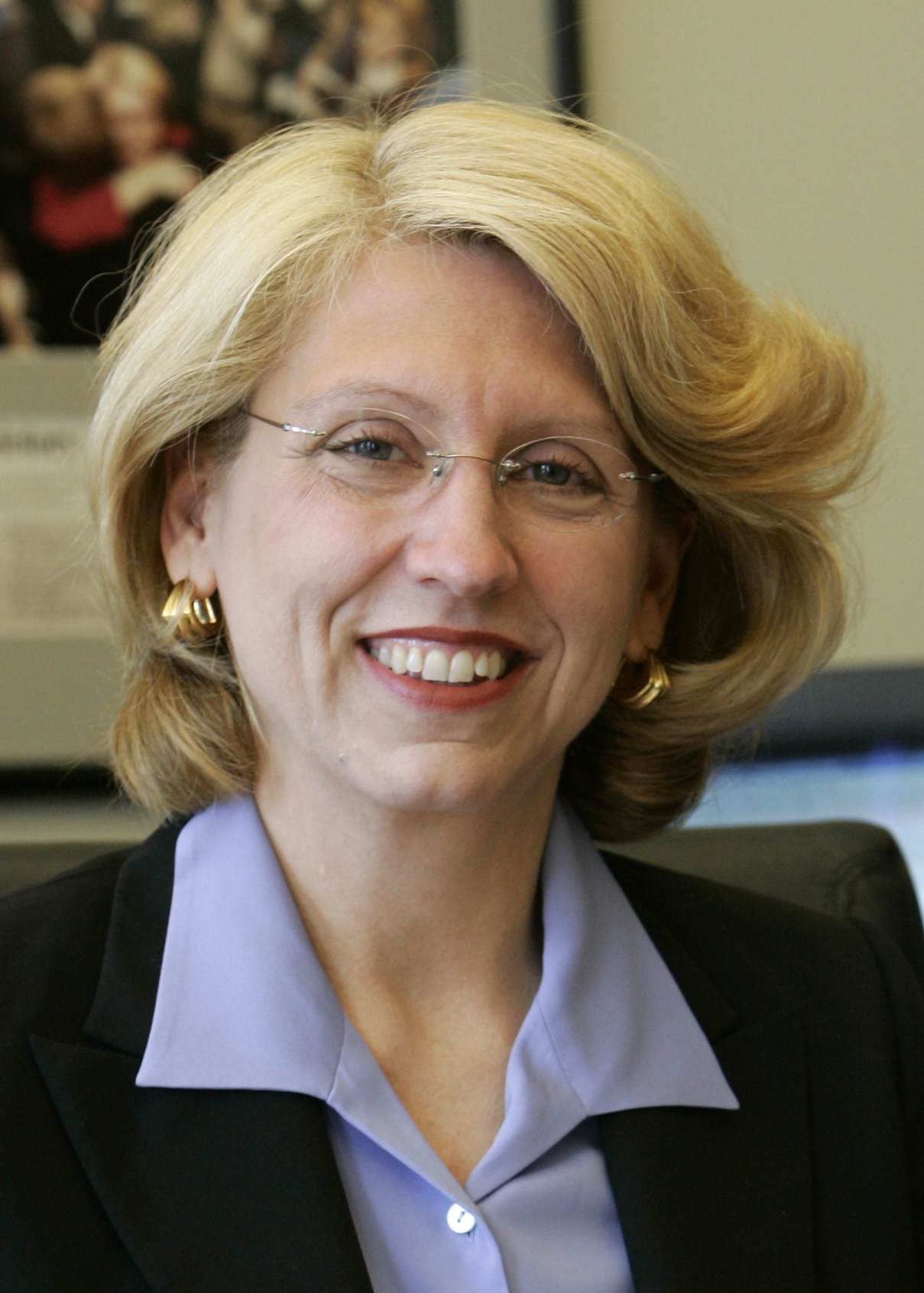
Nominee	Gary Peters	Terri Lynn Land
Party	Democratic	Republican
Popular vote	1,704,936	1,290,199
Percentage	54.61%	41.33%
- Peters: 40–50% 50–60% 60–70% 70–80% 80–90% >90% Land: 40–50% 50–60% 60–70% 70–80% 80–90% >90% Tie
U.S. senator before election
Carl Levin
Democratic
Elected U.S. Senator
Gary Peters
Democratic

The 2014 United States Senate election in Michigan was held on November 4, 2014, to elect a member of the United States Senate to represent the State of Michigan, concurrently with the election of the governor of Michigan, other elections to the United States Senate in other states, elections to the United States House of Representatives, and various state and local elections.

Incumbent Democratic Senator Carl Levin decided to retire instead of running for a seventh term. Primary contests took place on August 5, 2014, with U.S. Representative Gary Peters and former Michigan Secretary of State Terri Lynn Land unopposed on the Democratic and Republican primary ballots, respectively. Peters defeated Land in the general election, becoming the only freshman Democratic senator in the 114th Congress.

This was the first open seat election in Michigan since 1994 and the first on this seat since 1918. As Republican Governor Rick Snyder concurrently won a second term, 2014 was also the first time since 1990 that the winner of the Michigan U.S. Senate race was of a different political party than that of the concurrent gubernatorial election.

== Democratic primary ==
=== Candidates ===
==== Nominee ====
- Gary Peters, U.S. representative from Michigan's 14th congressional district

==== Failed to qualify ====
- Terry Whitney, technology executive

==== Declined ====
- Shane Battier, National Basketball Association player
- Jocelyn Benson, dean of Wayne State University Law School and nominee for Michigan secretary of state in 2010
- Virgil Bernero, mayor of Lansing and nominee for governor in 2010
- Mark Bernstein, attorney and regent of the University of Michigan
- James Blanchard, former governor of Michigan
- Debbie Dingell, chairman of the Wayne State University board of governors and wife of U.S. Representative John Dingell (ran successfully for U.S. House)
- Jennifer Granholm, former governor of Michigan
- Dan Kildee, U.S. representative
- Carl Levin, incumbent U.S. senator
- Sander Levin, U.S. representative from Michigan's 9th congressional district and brother of Carl Levin
- Gretchen Whitmer, minority leader of the Michigan Senate

=== Endorsements ===
Gary Peters

Politicians

- Jennifer Granholm, former governor of Michigan
- Mark Hackel, Macomb County executive
- Dan Kildee, U.S. representative (MI-05)
- Carl Levin, U.S. senator (D-MI)
- Anthony Marrocco, Macomb County public works commissioner
- Carmella Sabaugh, Macomb County clerk
- Eric Smith, Macomb County prosecutor
- Debbie Stabenow, U.S. senator (D-MI)
- Ted Wahby, Macomb County treasurer
- Anthony Wickersham, Macomb County sheriff

Newspapers and other media

- Detroit Free Press
- Detroit News
- Lansing State Journal
- MLive Media Group
- Traverse City Record-Eagle

Organizations

- Michigan Credit Union League
- Sierra Club

=== Polling ===
Hypothetical polling

Poll source	Date(s) administered	Sample size	Margin of error	Deborah Dingell	Jennifer Granholm	Dan Kildee	Gary Peters	Other	Undecided	—	Harper Polling	March 9–10, 2013	—	±	23.29%	57.50%	6.40%	12.81%	45%	25%	—
Mitchell Research	March 19 & 21, 2013	387	±4.98%	30%	—																

=== Results ===
Democratic primary results
Party	Candidate	Votes	%
Democratic	Gary Peters	504,102	100.00%
Total votes		504,102	100.00%

== Republican primary ==
After Terri Lynn Land declared her candidacy in June 2013, Republicans attempted to recruit U.S. Representative Dave Camp and Oakland County District Court Judge Kimberly Small to run instead. Camp, after earlier having said that he was not interested in running, reconsidered it, and Land indicated that she would consider dropping out if Camp decided to run. Republicans were initially reluctant to rally around Land, but after Camp and Small declined to run, other Republicans like U.S. Representative Justin Amash and Holland Mayor Kurt Dykstra also said no, and a late attempt to convince cardiologist Rob Steele to run failed, Land emerged as the de facto nominee.

=== Candidates ===
==== Declared ====
- Terri Lynn Land, former member of the Republican National Committee and former Michigan secretary of state

==== Withdrew ====
- Matthew Wiedenhoeft, businessman and former minor league hockey player and coach (ran for state house)

==== Declined ====
- Justin Amash, U.S. representative
- Saul Anuzis, former chairman of the Michigan Republican Party
- Dave Brandon, University of Michigan athletic director
- Brian Calley, lieutenant governor of Michigan
- Dave Camp, U.S. representative
- Mike Cox, former Michigan attorney general
- Betsy DeVos, former chairman of the Michigan Republican Party
- Dick DeVos, businessman and nominee for governor in 2006
- Clark Durant, charter school advocate and candidate for the U.S. Senate in 1990 and 2012
- Kurt Dykstra, mayor of Holland
- John Engler, former governor of Michigan
- Pete Hoekstra, former U.S. representative and 2012 Senate nominee
- Ruth Johnson, Michigan secretary of state
- Roger Kahn, state senator
- Pete Lund, majority whip of the Michigan House of Representatives
- Ronna McDaniel, Republican National Committeewoman and member of the Romney family
- Candice Miller, U.S. representative
- Jim Murray, president of AT&T Michigan
- Andrea Fischer Newman, regent of the University of Michigan
- John Rakolta, businessman
- Randy Richardville, majority leader of the Michigan Senate
- Mike Rogers, U.S. representative
- Scott Romney, former member of the Michigan State University board of trustees, candidate for attorney general of Michigan in 1998 and member of the Romney family
- Bill Schuette, Michigan attorney general
- Kimberly Small, judge on Michigan's 48th District Court
- Rob Steele, cardiologist

=== Endorsements ===
Terri Lynn Land

Politicians

- Brian Calley, lieutenant governor of Michigan
- Pete Hoekstra, former U.S. representative (MI-02), candidate for governor in 2010 and nominee for the U.S. Senate in 2012
- Candice Miller, U.S. representative (MI-10) and former Michigan secretary of state
- Rob Montilla, chairman of the Macomb County Republican Party
- Rick Santorum, former U.S. senator from Pennsylvania and candidate for president of the United States in 2012

Organizations

- GOProud, gay conservative organization
- Right to Life of Michigan PAC

=== Polling ===
Hypothetical polling

Poll source	Date(s) administered	Sample size	Margin of error	Justin Amash	Saul Anuzis	Dave Camp	Kurt Dykstra	Roger Kahn	Terri Lynn Land	Pete Lund	Jim Murray	Mike Rogers	G. Scott Romney	Ronna Romney McDaniel	Kimberly Small	Rob Steele	Undecided
Harper Polling	March 9–10, 2013	1,744	±2.35%	10.57%	—	—	—	—	8.94%	—	—	17.07%	25.85%	—	—	—	37.56%
Mitchell Research	March 19 & 21, 2013	438	±4.68%	18%	—	—	—	—	11%	—	—	21%	—	19%	—	—	31%
Murray Comm's	May 20, 2013	1,158	±4.68%	10.28%	1.38%	—	9.93%	5.18%	28.84%	4.66%	1.21%	35.66%	—	—	—	2.85%	—
PPP	May 30 – June 2, 2013	334	±5.4%	16%	7%	21%	—	1%	15%	—	—	18%	—	—	2%	1%	20%
Harper Polling	September 4, 2013	958	±3.17%	—	—	—	16%	—	45%	—	—	—	—	—	2%	4%	33%
Harper Polling	September 4, 2013	958	±3.17%	—	—	—	—	—	50%	—	—	—	—	—	—	13%	37%

=== Results ===
Republican primary results
Party	Candidate	Votes	%
Republican	Terri Lynn Land	588,084	100.00%
Total votes		588,084	100.00%

== Minor parties ==
=== Libertarian Party ===
- Robert James "Jim" Fulner

=== U.S. Taxpayers Party ===
- Richard A. Matkin

=== Green Party ===
- Chris Wahmhoff

== Independents ==
=== Candidates ===
==== Declared ====
- Jeff Jones, retired financial services industry worker and pastor
- Paul Marineau, attorney and former mayor pro tem of Douglas

== General election ==
=== Campaign ===
Early on, the open seat was considered to be competitive. However, various missteps by the Land campaign as well as Land's reluctance to appear in public after suffering a meltdown in front of the media in May, weighed down the Land campaign, allowing Peters to open up a consistent lead in the polls beginning in September. The Republican establishment effectively gave up on Land's campaign the following month.

=== Debates ===
Peters agreed to four debates; Land did not respond to invitations. Negotiations between the Land and Peters campaigns broke down over the format of proposed debates between the two candidates.

=== Predictions ===
Source	Ranking	As of
The Cook Political Report	Lean D	November 3, 2014
Sabato's Crystal Ball	Likely D	November 3, 2014
Rothenberg Political Report	Likely D	November 3, 2014
Real Clear Politics	Likely D	November 3, 2014

=== Polling ===
Poll source	Date(s) administered	Sample size	Margin of error	Gary Peters (D)	Terri Lynn Land (R)	Other	Undecided
Harper Polling	March 9–10, 2013	1,744	± 2.35%	21%	29%	—	50%
Mitchell Research	March 19 & 21, 2013	571	± 4.1%	33%	32%	—	35%
Public Policy Polling	May 30 – June 2, 2013	697	± 3.7%	41%	36%	—	23%
Denno Research	July 23–24, 2013	600	± 4%	39%	39%	—	22%
Mitchell Research	August 26, 2013	1,881	± 2.23%	36%	39%	—	25%
EPIC-MRA	September 7–10, 2013	600	± 4%	38%	37%	—	25%
MRG/Mitchell Research	October 6–10, 2013	600	± 4%	39%	40%	—	21%
Public Policy Polling	October 14–15, 2013	642	± 3.9%	43%	36%	—	21%
Inside Michigan Politics	October 29, 2013	794	± 4%	43%	38%	—	19%
Denno Research	November 12–14, 2013	600	± 4%	37%	36%	—	27%
Public Policy Polling	December 5–8, 2013	1,034	± 3%	40%	42%	—	18%
Harper Polling	January 7–8, 2014	1,004	± 3.09%	36%	44%	—	20%
Rasmussen Reports	January 14–15, 2014	500	± 4.5%	35%	37%	8%	20%
Harper Polling	January 19–20, 2014	750	± 3.58%	37%	42%	—	21%
EPIC-MRA	February 5–11, 2014	600	± 4%	38%	41%	—	21%
Clarity Campaigns	February 22–23, 2014	859	± 2.55%	46%	40%	—	14%
Denno Research	March 9–10, 2014	600	± 4%	40%	37%	2%	22%
Marketing Resource Group	March 24–28, 2014	600	± 4.1%	38%	40%	—	22%
Public Policy Polling	April 3–6, 2014	825	± 3.4%	41%	36%	—	23%
Mitchell Research	April 9, 2014	1,460	± 2.56%	38%	44%	—	18%
Harper Polling	April 7–8, 2014	538	± 4.22%	40%	43%	—	18%
Magellan Strategies	April 14–15, 2014	875	± 3.31%	46%	41%	8%	5%
Hickman Analytics	April 24–30, 2014	502	± 4.4%	42%	37%	—	21%
EPIC-MRA	May 17–20, 2014	600	± 4%	44%	38%	—	18%
Glengariff Group	May 20–22, 2014	600	± 4.3%	40%	35%	—	25%
Mitchell Research	June 6, 2014	961	± 3.16%	45%	42%	—	14%
Magellan Strategies	June 5 & 8, 2014	753	± 3.57%	50%	41%	5%	4%
Public Policy Polling	June 26–29, 2014	578	± 4.1%	41%	36%	—	24%
NBC News/Marist	July 7–10, 2014	870	± 3.3%	43%	37%	2%	19%
Denno Research	July 9–11, 2014	600	± 4%	40%	37%	—	23%
EPIC-MRA	July 12–15, 2014	600	± 4%	45%	36%	—	19%
Mitchell Research	July 7–17, 2014	600	± 4%	43%	38%	—	19%
CBS News/NYT/YouGov	July 5–24, 2014	3,849	± 2.8%	44%	45%	1%	10%
Benenson Strategy Group	July 26–29, 2014	900	± 3.2%	47%	42%	—	11%
Rasmussen Reports	July 28–29, 2014	750	± 4%	45%	39%	6%	10%
Marketing Resource Group	July 26–30, 2014	600	± 4%	47%	40%	—	13%
Harper Polling	August 4–5, 2014	549	± 4.18%	45%	44%	—	11%
Mitchell Research	August 5, 2014	626	± 5%	45%	44%	—	11%
Lake Research Partners	August 6–11, 2014	800	± 3.5%	42%	38%	—	19%
EPIC-MRA	August 22–25, 2014	600	± 4%	45%	39%	—	16%
Mitchell Research	August 27, 2014	1,004	± 3.09%	46%	44%	—	10%
CBS News/NYT/YouGov	August 18 – September 2, 2014	2,897	± 3%	42%	43%	2%	13%
Glengariff Group	September 3–5, 2014	600	± 4%	47%	37%	4%	13%
Public Policy Polling	September 4–7, 2014	687	± 3.7%	43%	36%	7%	13%
Public Policy Polling	September 4–7, 2014	687	± 3.7%	45%	40%	—	15%
Suffolk	September 6–10, 2014	500	± 4.4%	46%	37%	6%	11%
Denno Research	September 11–13, 2014	600	± 4%	45%	38%	—	18%
Mitchell Research	September 14, 2014	829	± 3.4%	43%	41%	8%	9%
Magellan Strategies	September 14–15, 2014	717	± 3.66%	45%	40%	5%	5%
Rasmussen Reports	September 17–18, 2014	750	± 4%	41%	39%	5%	15%
We Ask America	September 18–19, 2014	1,182	± 3%	42%	39%	5%	14%
Public Policy Polling	September 18–19, 2014	852	± 3.4%	47%	40%	—	13%
Target Insyght	September 22–24, 2014	616	± 4%	48%	38%	6%	7%
EPIC-MRA	September 25–29, 2014	600	± 4%	42%	33%	11%	14%
Mitchell Research	September 29, 2014	1,178	± 2.86%	49%	36%	5%	9%
Lake Research Partners	September 27–30, 2014	600	± 4%	45%	36%	—	18%
CBS News/NYT/YouGov	September 20 – October 1, 2014	2,560	± 2%	46%	41%	2%	11%
Marketing Resource Group	September 30 – October 2, 2014	600	± 4%	47%	36%	—	16%
Public Policy Polling	October 2–3, 2014	654	± 3.8%	49%	42%	—	9%
Glengariff Group	October 2–4, 2014	600	± 4%	44%	35%	6%	15%
Wenzel Strategies	October 6–7, 2014	615	± 3.93%	47%	44%	—	9%
Mitchell Research	October 9, 2014	1,306	± 2.71%	48%	43%	4%	6%
Mitchell Research	October 12, 2014	1,340	± 2.68%	50%	39%	4%	8%
Lake Research Partners	October 11–13, 2014	?	± ?	49%	37%	—	14%
Clarity Campaign Labs	October 12–14, 2014	967	± 3.16%	49%	36%	—	18%
EPIC-MRA	October 17–19, 2014	600	± 4%	45%	34%	4%	16%
Mitchell Research	October 19, 2014	919	± 3.23%	51%	38%	4%	7%
Clarity Campaign Labs	October 19–20, 2014	1,032	± ?	48%	33%	—	19%
Public Policy Polling	October 20–21, 2014	723	± ?	53%	39%	—	8%
Rasmussen Reports	October 20–22, 2014	1,000	± 3%	51%	42%	3%	4%
CBS News/NYT/YouGov	October 16–23, 2014	2,394	± 3%	49%	41%	1%	10%
Glengariff Group	October 22–24, 2014	600	± 4%	48%	33%	6%	14%
Mitchell Research	October 27, 2014	1,159	± 2.88%	52%	38%	5%	5%
EPIC-MRA	October 26–28, 2014	600	± 4%	50%	35%	5%	10%
Public Policy Polling	November 1–2, 2014	914	± 3.2%	51%	38%	4%	6%
Public Policy Polling	November 1–2, 2014	914	± 3.2%	54%	41%	—	5%
Mitchell Research	November 2, 2014	1,224	± 2.8%	52%	40%	4%	4%

Hypothetical polling

With Dingell

Poll source	Date(s) administered	Sample size	Margin of error	Deborah Dingell (D)	Justin Amash (R)	Other	Undecided
Mitchell Research	March 19 & 21, 2013	1,744	± 2.35%	38%	28%	—	34%

Poll source	Date(s) administered	Sample size	Margin of error	Deborah Dingell (D)	Terri Lynn Land (R)	Other	Undecided
Mitchell Research	March 19 & 21, 2013	1,744	± 2.35%	31%	35%	—	34%

Poll source	Date(s) administered	Sample size	Margin of error	Deborah Dingell (D)	Mike Rogers (R)	Other	Undecided
Mitchell Research	March 19 & 21, 2013	1,744	± 2.35%	34%	29%	—	37%

Poll source	Date(s) administered	Sample size	Margin of error	Deborah Dingell (D)	Ronna Romney McDaniel (R)	Other	Undecided
Mitchell Research	March 19 & 21, 2013	1,744	± 2.35%	36%	29%	—	35%

With Granholm

Poll source	Date(s) administered	Sample size	Margin of error	Jennifer Granholm (D)	Justin Amash (R)	Other	Undecided
Harper Polling	March 9–10, 2013	1,744	± 2.35%	42%	34%	—	23%

Poll source	Date(s) administered	Sample size	Margin of error	Jennifer Granholm (D)	Terri Lynn Land (R)	Other	Undecided
Harper Polling	March 9–10, 2013	1,744	± 2.35%	43%	40%	—	17%

Poll source	Date(s) administered	Sample size	Margin of error	Jennifer Granholm (D)	Mike Rogers (R)	Other	Undecided
Harper Polling	March 9–10, 2013	1,744	± 2.35%	42%	40%	—	18%

Poll source	Date(s) administered	Sample size	Margin of error	Jennifer Granholm (D)	G. Scott Romney (R)	Other	Undecided
Harper Polling	March 9–10, 2013	1,744	± 2.35%	43%	40%	—	17%

With Levin

Poll source	Date(s) administered	Sample size	Margin of error	Carl Levin (D)	Justin Amash (R)	Other	Undecided
Public Policy Polling	December 13–16, 2012	650	± 3.8%	53%	32%	—	15%
Public Policy Polling	March 2–4, 2013	702	± 3.7%	49%	34%	—	18%

Poll source	Date(s) administered	Sample size	Margin of error	Carl Levin (D)	Roger Kahn (R)	Other	Undecided
Public Policy Polling	December 13–16, 2012	650	± 3.8%	53%	31%	—	17%
Public Policy Polling	March 2–4, 2013	702	± 3.7%	50%	30%	—	20%

Poll source	Date(s) administered	Sample size	Margin of error	Carl Levin (D)	Candice Miller (R)	Other	Undecided
Public Policy Polling	December 13–16, 2012	650	± 3.8%	52%	34%	—	14%
Public Policy Polling	March 2–4, 2013	702	± 3.7%	46%	35%	—	19%

Poll source	Date(s) administered	Sample size	Margin of error	Carl Levin (D)	Mike Rogers (R)	Other	Undecided
Public Policy Polling	December 13–16, 2012	650	± 3.8%	55%	31%	—	14%
Public Policy Polling	March 2–4, 2013	702	± 3.7%	49%	33%	—	18%

Poll source	Date(s) administered	Sample size	Margin of error	Carl Levin (D)	Bill Schuette (R)	Other	Undecided
Public Policy Polling	December 13–16, 2012	650	± 3.8%	54%	32%	—	15%
Public Policy Polling	March 2–4, 2013	702	± 3.7%	51%	32%	—	17%

With LOLGOP

Poll source	Date(s) administered	Sample size	Margin of error	LOLGOP (D)	Justin Amash (R)	Other	Undecided
Public Policy Polling	May 30 – June 2, 2013	697	± 3.7%	23%	22%	—	55%

With Peters

Poll source	Date(s) administered	Sample size	Margin of error	Gary Peters (D)	Justin Amash (R)	Other	Undecided
Harper Polling	March 9–10, 2013	1,744	± 2.35%	23%	19%	—	57%
Mitchell Research	March 19 & 21, 2013	1,744	± 2.35%	39%	29%	—	32%
Public Policy Polling	May 30 – June 2, 2013	697	± 3.7%	42%	30%	—	29%

Poll source	Date(s) administered	Sample size	Margin of error	Gary Peters (D)	Saul Anuzis (R)	Other	Undecided
Public Policy Polling	May 30 – June 2, 2013	697	± 3.7%	44%	24%	—	32%

Poll source	Date(s) administered	Sample size	Margin of error	Gary Peters (D)	Dave Camp (R)	Other	Undecided
Public Policy Polling	May 30 – June 2, 2013	697	± 3.7%	43%	31%	—	26%

Poll source	Date(s) administered	Sample size	Margin of error	Gary Peters (D)	Kurt Dykstra (R)	Other	Undecided
Mitchell Research	August 26, 2013	1,881	± 2.23%	38%	37%	—	25%

Poll source	Date(s) administered	Sample size	Margin of error	Gary Peters (D)	Roger Kahn (R)	Other	Undecided
Public Policy Polling	May 30 – June 2, 2013	697	± 3.7%	44%	26%	—	30%

Poll source	Date(s) administered	Sample size	Margin of error	Gary Peters (D)	Mike Rogers (R)	Other	Undecided
Harper Polling	March 9–10, 2013	1,744	± 2.35%	20%	23%	—	57%
Mitchell Research	March 19 & 21, 2013	1,744	± 2.35%	36%	31%	—	33%
EPIC-MRA	May 11–15, 2013	600	± 4%	37%	30%	—	33%
Public Policy Polling	May 30 – June 2, 2013	697	± 3.7%	42%	32%	—	25%

Poll source	Date(s) administered	Sample size	Margin of error	Gary Peters (D)	G. Scott Romney (R)	Other	Undecided
Harper Polling	March 9–10, 2013	1,744	± 2.35%	26%	29%	—	45%

Poll source	Date(s) administered	Sample size	Margin of error	Gary Peters (D)	Ronna Romney McDaniel (R)	Other	Undecided
Mitchell Research	March 19 & 21, 2013	1,744	± 2.35%	36%	29%	—	35%

Poll source	Date(s) administered	Sample size	Margin of error	Gary Peters (D)	Kimberly Small (R)	Other	Undecided
Public Policy Polling	May 30 – June 2, 2013	697	± 3.7%	42%	26%	—	32%

Poll source	Date(s) administered	Sample size	Margin of error	Gary Peters (D)	Rob Steele (R)	Other	Undecided
Public Policy Polling	May 30 – June 2, 2013	697	± 3.7%	44%	26%	—	29%

=== Results ===
Peters was declared the winner right when the polls closed in Michigan.

2014 United States Senate election in Michigan
Party	Candidate	Votes	%	±%
Democratic	Gary Peters	1,704,936	54.61%	−8.05%
Republican	Terri Lynn Land	1,290,199	41.33%	+7.48%
Libertarian	Jim Fulner	62,897	2.01%	+0.44%
U.S. Taxpayers'	Richard Matkin	37,529	1.20%	+0.56%
Green	Chris Wahmhoff	26,137	0.84%	−0.06%
Write-in		77	0.00%	N/A
Total votes		3,121,775	100.00%	N/A
Democratic hold				

==== Counties that flipped from Democratic to Republican ====
- Branch (largest city: Coldwater)
- Lenawee (largest city: Adrian)
- Tuscola (largest city: Caro)
- Montcalm (largest city: Greenville)
- Wexford (largest city: Cadillac)
- Cheboygan (largest city: Cheboygan)
- Schoolcraft (largest city: Manistique)
- Ontonagon (largest city: Ontonagon)
- Menominee (largest city: Menominee)
- Mackinac (largest city: St. Ignace)
- Keweenaw (largest city: Ahmeek)
- Houghton (largest city: Houghton)
- Delta (largest city: Escanaba)
- Dickinson (largest city: Iron Mountain)
- Baraga (largest city: Baraga)
- Charlevoix (largest city: Boyne City)
- Emmet (largest city: Petosky)
- Montmorency (largest city: Lewiston)
- Otsego (largest city: Gaylord)
- Antrim (largest city: Elk Rapids)
- Crawford (largest city: Grayling)
- Kalkaska (largest city: Kalkaska)
- Grand Traverse (largest city: Traverse City)
- Oscoda (largest city: Mio)
- Osceola (largest city: Reed City)
- Alcona (largest city: Harrisville)
- Mason (largest city: Ludington)
- Oceana (largest city: Hart)
- Mecosta (largest city: Big Rapids)
- Newaygo (largest city: Fremont)
- Huron (largest city: Bad Axe)
- Sanilac (largest city: Sandusky)
- Midland (largest city: Midland)
- Lapeer (largest city: Lapeer)
- Kent (largest city: Grand Rapids)
- Ionia (largest city: Ionia)
- Cass (largest city: Dowagiac)
- Berrien (largest city: Niles)
- St. Joseph (largest city: Sturgis)

==== By congressional district ====
Peters won nine of 14 congressional districts, including four that elected Republicans.

District	Peters	Land	Representative
1st	46.8%	49.6%	Dan Benishek
2nd	41.4%	54.2%	
2nd	41.4%	54.2%	Bill Huizenga
3rd	45.1%	50.4%	Justin Amash
4th	48.1%	47.2%	Dave Camp (113th Congress)
4th	48.1%	47.2%	John Moolenaar (114th Congress)
5th	63.7%	32.5%	Dan Kildee
6th	45.9%	49.4%	Fred Upton
7th	48.6%	47.1%	Tim Walberg
8th	49.6%	46.3%	Mike Rogers (113th Congress)
8th	49.6%	46.3%	Mike Bishop (114th Congress)
9th	59.3%	36.2%	Sander Levin
10th	46.6%	48.5%	Candice Miller
11th	49.1%	47.0%	Kerry Bentivolio (113th Congress)
11th	49.1%	47.0%	Dave Trott (114th Congress)
12th	66.3%	29.5%	John Dingell (113th Congress)
12th	66.3%	29.5%	Debbie Dingell (114th Congress)
13th	83.5%	13.6%	John Conyers
14th	80.3%	17.8%	Gary Peters (113th Congress)
14th	80.3%	17.8%	Brenda Lawrence (114th Congress)

== Post-election ==
Land ended up paying a fee of $66,000 to the Federal Election Commission for a violation of the Federal Election Campaign Act related to the 2014 campaign.

Peters would run again in 2020 to retain the Senate seat he won, while Land would go on to win a seat on the Board of Governors for Wayne State University in the same year.

== See also ==
- 2014 Michigan gubernatorial election
- 2014 Michigan Attorney General election
- 2014 Michigan Secretary of State election
- 2014 United States Senate elections
- 2014 United States elections
- 2014 United States House of Representatives elections in Michigan
