= 2012 United States Senate election in Michigan =

- November 6, 2012
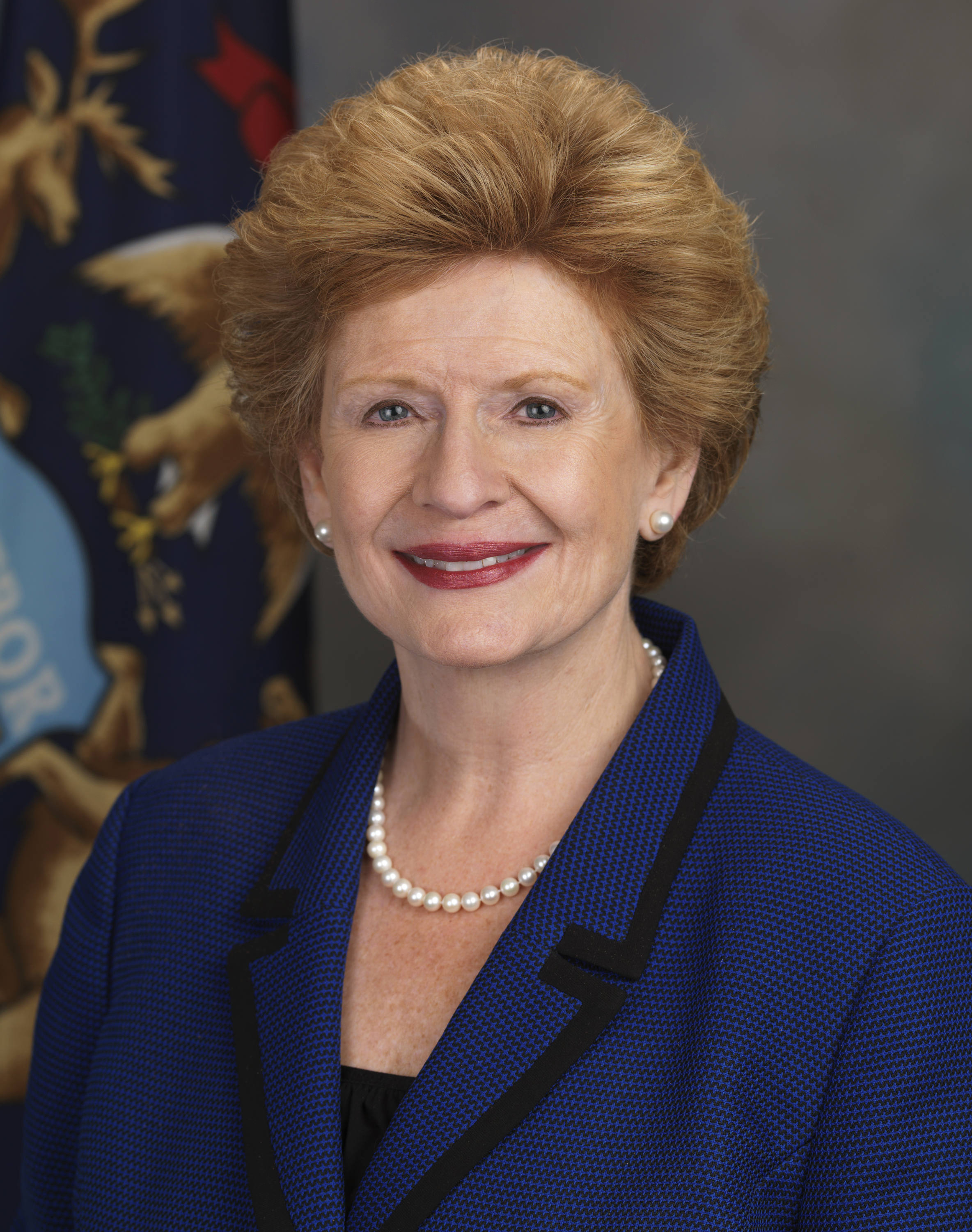

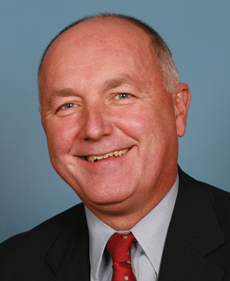
Nominee	Debbie Stabenow	Pete Hoekstra
Party	Democratic	Republican
Popular vote	2,735,826	1,767,386
Percentage	58.80%	37.98%
- Stabenow: 40–50% 50–60% 60–70% 70–80% 80–90% Hoekstra: 40–50% 50–60% 60–70%
U.S. senator before election
Debbie Stabenow
Democratic
Elected U.S. Senator
Debbie Stabenow
Democratic

The 2012 United States Senate election in Michigan was held on November 6, 2012, alongside the 2012 United States presidential election, other elections to the United States Senate in other states, as well as elections to the United States House of Representatives and various state and local elections.

Incumbent Debbie Stabenow was re-elected in 2006 with 57% of the vote to 41%. She defeated Oakland County Sheriff and former State Senate Majority Leader Michael Bouchard after narrowly defeating Republican incumbent Spencer Abraham in 2000. The deadline for candidates to file for the August 7 primary was May 15. Incumbent Democratic U.S. Senator Debbie Stabenow was re-elected to a third term after being unopposed in the Democratic primary. The Republican nominee was former Congressman Pete Hoekstra. Stabenow defeated Hoekstra by a landslide 20.8% margin and nearly one million votes.

== Democratic primary ==
Democratic primary results
Party	Candidate	Votes	%
Democratic	Debbie Stabenow (incumbent)	702,773	100.00%
Total votes		702,773	100.00%

== Republican primary ==
=== Candidates ===
Qualified/On ballot

- Clark Durant, co-founder of the Cornerstone Schools
- Gary Glenn, conservative activist (suspended his campaign and endorsed Clark Durant)
- Randy Hekman, former juvenile court judge
- Pete Hoekstra, former U.S. representative

Filed to run, but failed to qualify

- Scotty Boman (switched back to the Libertarian Party)
- Peter Konetchy, businessman
- Chuck Marino, businessman
- Rick Wilson, retired autoworker and unsuccessful candidate for the 5th district in 2010

Declined to file

- Justin Amash, U.S. representative
- Saul Anuzis, former Michigan Republican Party chairman
- Frank Beckmann, talk show host
- Mike Bishop, former state senate majority leader
- Jase Bolger, speaker of the Michigan House of Representatives
- Mike Cox, former Michigan attorney general
- Chad Dewey, businessman
- John Engler, former governor
- Terri Lynn Land, former Michigan secretary of state
- Thaddeus McCotter, former U.S. representative
- John McCulloch, Oakland County Water Resources commissioner (dropped out)
- Candice Miller, U.S. representative and former Michigan secretary of state
- Rob Steele, cardiothoracic surgeon

=== Campaign ===
The GOP primary campaign was mainly a battle between Hoekstra and Durant, as they were the most visible in running campaign ads. Despite Durant's attack ads, Hoekstra was leading in the polls for the Republican nomination.

On July 20, Glenn suspended his campaign and endorsed Durant; however, his name was still on the ballot due to the time of his withdrawal.

==== Hoekstra ad controversy ====
Hoekstra targeted Democratic incumbent Debbie Stabenow with a television ad which ran statewide during the 2012 Super Bowl. The 30-second ad opened with the sound of a gong and showed an Asian woman riding a bike in a rice paddy and talking in pidgin English. The ad is critical of government spending by Stabenow and mocks her name, with the Asian woman saying, "Thank you, Michigan Senator Debbie Spenditnow". The commercial asks viewers to visit Hoekstra's website, which had statistics about federal spending beside images of Chinese flags, currency and stereotypical Chinatown font. In the HTML code on Hoekstra's site the woman in the ad was reportedly previously identified as "yellowgirl". It has since been removed.

Asian-American groups called the ad "very disturbing", national GOP consultant Mike Murphy said it was "really, really dumb", and Foreign Policy magazine managing editor Blake Hounshell called it "despicable". A coalition of black ministers in Detroit called for Hoekstra to apologize. Two of Hoekstra's GOP opponents, Clark Durant and Gary Glenn, questioned whether Hoekstra was the right candidate for Republicans to support. The ad was called "blatantly racist" by Michael Yaki, former aide to House Speaker Nancy Pelosi and a member of the U.S. Commission on Civil Rights. Journalist James Fallows of The Atlantic called it the "most revolting ad". The NAACP denounced the ad as an "unnecessary race card." Some warned the ad would revive discrimination against Asian-Americans in Michigan where smashing imported cars was common in the 1980s, and in 1982 Chinese-American Vincent Chin was beaten to death by two unemployed autoworkers angry about Japanese competition. Critics also pointed out that Hoekstra voted for the $700-billion Wall Street bailout and voted for trillions more in deficit spending while he was in Congress.

A Public Policy Polling poll released on February 14 showed Stabenow leading Hoekstra 51%-37%. In April 2012, Stabenow's campaign reported that she had had her best fundraising quarter ever, taking $1.5m from January to March 2012, which they said was in part due to the advertisement. Hoekstra's campaign, meanwhile, reported disappointing fundraising numbers for the first quarter of 2012, raising just $700,000, down almost $300,000 from the final quarter of 2011.

Despite the criticism, the ad was a factor in Hoekstra's Republican primary victory.

=== Polling ===
Poll source	Date(s) administered	Sample size	Margin of error	Clark Durant	Gary Glenn	Randy Hekman	Pete Hoekstra	Peter Konetchy	Other/ Undecided
Public Policy Polling	May 24–27, 2012	360	±5.2%	11%	4%	4%	42%	0%	38%
Public Policy Polling	July 21–23, 2012	452	±4.6%	17%	—	4%	51%	1%	26%

=== Results ===
Results by county: Hoekstra: 40–50%; 50–60%; 60–70%; >70%; Durant: 40–50%

Republican primary results
Party	Candidate	Votes	%
Republican	Pete Hoekstra	398,793	54.2
Republican	Clark Durant	246,584	33.5
Republican	Randy Hekman	49,080	6.7
Republican	Gary Glenn	40,726	5.5
Total votes		735,183	100.0

== General election ==
=== Candidates ===
- Scott Boman (Libertarian), college professor and libertarian activist
- Pete Hoekstra (Republican), former U.S. congressman
- John Litle (Natural Law Party)
- Richard Matkin (U.S. Taxpayers Party of Michigan)
- Harley Mikkelson (Green)
- Debbie Stabenow (Democratic), incumbent U.S. senator and former U.S. congresswoman

=== Fundraising ===
Candidate (party)	Receipts	Disbursements	Cash on hand	Debt
Debbie Stabenow (D)	$10,625,660	$11,376,831	$1,281,907	$0
Pete Hoekstra (R)	$5,827,123	$5,550,301	$277,855	$0
Scott Boman (L)	$10,280	$10,265	$12	$0
Source: Federal Election Commission

==== Top contributors ====
Debbie Stabenow	Contribution	Pete Hoekstra	Contribution
EMILY's List	$107,650	PVS Chemicals	$40,000
DTE Energy	$89,150	Caidan Management	$33,000
JP Morgan Chase & Co	$70,300	Amway	$31,300
Blue Cross & Blue Shield	$51,682	Dickstein Shapiro LLP	$20,999
University of Michigan	$45,362	Haworth Inc.	$20,000
Vestar Capital Partners	$39,950	American Axle & Manufacturing	$17,500
Demmer Corp	$39,800	Centra Inc	$17,000
General Motors	$38,350	Byrne Electrical Specialists	$15,500
Ford Motor Co	$35,375	RA Miller Industries	$15,000
Goldman Sachs	$34,500	Suburban Collection	$15,000

==== Top industries ====
Debbie Stabenow	Contribution	Pete Hoekstra	Contribution
Lawyers/law firms	$622,208	Retired	$329,199
Financial institutions	$589,188	Real estate	$124,050
Health professionals	$454,525	Republican/Conservative	$105,400
Retired	$377,484	Manufacturing & distributing	$84,300
Lobbyists	$340,063	Leadership PACs	$83,750
Hospitals/nursing homes	$316,122	Lawyers/law firms	$82,059
Agribusiness	$287,603	Automotive industry	$68,150
Insurance	$286,675	Chemical industry	$58,500
Women's issues	$277,570	Health services/HMOs	$58,000
Leadership PACs	$263,500	Business services	$56,493

=== Debates ===
A number of United States Senate debates were held in the 2012 election cycle, but none included more than two of the general election candidates at a time. Incumbent senator Debbie Stabenow did not attend any of them. Before the primary, non-partisan Tea Party groups hosted debates which were open to all candidates; however, all but one were attended exclusively by Republican primary candidates. The exception was the Romeo Area Tea Party Forum, on May 21, 2012, which included Scotty Boman after he changed his affiliation from Republican to Libertarian. Republican Pete Hoekstra had originally been scheduled to participate in the debate, but withdrew because he objected to the participation of one of the candidates. The Romeo forum was hosted by WJR AM radio talk show host Frank Beckmann, who said the candidate Hoekstra objected to was Boman.

There were debates in Dewitt, Zeeland, and Dearborn, which were attended by both Pete Hoekstra and Scotty Boman, who both qualified for the general election.

After the primary election, some forums were held which were attended by one of the invited United States Senate candidates, but only two post-primary debates were held which more than one general election candidate attended: Libertarian Scotty Boman and Green Party candidate Harley Mikkelson attended forums hosted by the League of Women Voters of Alpena County on October 23, and at Gaylord High School on October 24.

==== Controversy about debate qualifications ====
Since 1996, WGVU and the Detroit Economic Club had hosted United States Senate debates that featured all United States Senate candidates who met certain qualifications. In 1994, all balloted candidates were included in the televised debate on WKAR, but after then, only major party candidates qualified.

Pete Hoekstra and Debbie Stabenow had agreed in principle to debate, but failed to reach a consensus on the number of debates.

On October 9, Scotty Boman issued a press release in which he claimed polling results qualified him for the debates. On October 11, the Stabenow campaign issued a statement saying she was "...ending the ongoing debate over debates, due to Congressman Hoekstra's refusal to accept the traditional U.S. Senate debates and his constant political attacks." The Hoekstra campaign responded, "Debbie Stabenow's campaign refused to negotiate in good faith during the entire process."

Hoekstra continued to ask Stabenow to debate him, and attended at least three debates at which he was the only participant. On October 11, he attended a health care debate sponsored by the Independent Choice Network. On October 18, he attended a debate in Midland hosted by a group of local business leaders. Boman offered to participate in the October 18 debate, but Hoekstra's campaign manager Greg VanWoerkom said it was too late for Boman to participate, since he had had his chance to debate Hoekstra before the August primary, when he was running as a Republican. At the time, Hoekstra was scheduled to debate with Mikkelson and Boman at Gaylord High School on October 24, but Hoekstra did not attend. On October 23, Hoekstra held a debate in Kentwood.

As an alternative to the traditional WGVU debate, the station produced two back-to-back interviews with Stabenow and Hoekstra.

=== Predictions ===
Source	Ranking	As of
The Cook Political Report	Likely D	November 1, 2012
Sabato's Crystal Ball	Likely D	November 5, 2012
Rothenberg Political Report	Safe D	November 2, 2012
Real Clear Politics	Likely D	November 5, 2012

=== Polling ===
Poll source	Date(s) administered	Sample size	Margin of error	Debbie Stabenow (D)	Pete Hoekstra (R)	Other	Undecided
Public Policy Polling	December 3–6, 2010	1,224	±2.8%	45%	44%	—	11%
EPIC-MRA	February 12–17, 2011	600	±4.0%	44%	42%	—	14%
Public Policy Polling	March 18–20, 2011	502	±4.4%	50%	38%	—	12%
Public Policy Polling	July 21–24, 2011	593	±4.0%	50%	41%	—	9%
EPIC-MRA	August 13–16, 2011	600	±4.0%	47%	38%	—	15%
EPIC-MRA	November 13–16, 2011	600	±4.0%	48%	42%	—	10%
Wilson Research	January 9–11, 2012	601	±n/a	47%	41%	—	12%
Public Policy Polling	February 10–12, 2012	560	±4.1%	51%	37%	—	12%
NBC News/Marist	February 19–20, 2012	3,149	±1.8%	53%	32%	—	15%
MRG	March 14–19, 2012	600	±4.4%	45%	40%	—	15%
Public Policy Polling	May 24–27, 2012	500	±4.4%	53%	37%	—	10%
EPIC-MRA	June 2–5, 2012	600	±4.0%	49%	38%	—	13%
Rasmussen Reports	June 14, 2012	500	±4.5%	48%	39%	3%	10%
NBC News/Marist	June 24–25, 2012	1,078	±3.0%	49%	37%	—	14%
Public Policy Polling	July 21–23, 2012	579	±4.1%	52%	38%	—	10%
Rasmussen Reports	July 23, 2012	500	±4.5%	46%	40%	4%	10%
EPIC-MRA	July 24–31, 2012	600	±4.0%	49%	35%	—	16%
Bouydon-Foster	July 28, 2012	1,046	±3.03%	53%	43%	5%	3%
Bouydon-Foster	August 16, 2012	1,733	±2.3%	46%	48%	3%	5%
Detroit News	August 18–20, 2012	600	±4.0%	48%	40%	—	12%
Mitchell Research	August 23, 2012	1,277	±2.7%	44%	45%	—	11%
EPIC-MRA	August 28, 2012	1,200	±2.6%	51%	44%	—	5%
Public Policy Polling	August 31 – September 2, 2012	815	±3.4%	50%	41%	—	9%
EPIC-MRA	September 8–11, 2012	600	±4%	49%	38%	—	13%
Baydoun-Foster	September 12, 2012	1,156	±2.88%	47%	42%	3%	8%
Marketing Resource Group	September 10–15, 2012	600	±4%	46%	40%	—	14%
Detroit News	September 15–17, 2012	600	±4%	50%	34%	—	16%
Rasmussen Reports	September 20, 2012	500	±4.5%	53%	37%	3%	7%
Angus Reid Public Opinion	September 21–22, 2012	804	±3.3%	54%	40%	7%	—
Baydoun-Foster	October 5, 2012	1,122	±2.93%	51%	43%	2%	4%
Gravis Marketing	October 5–6, 2012	970	±3.2%	48%	39%	7%	6%
EPIC-MRA	October 4–6, 2012	600	±4%	55%	35%	—	10%
Glengariff	October 6–8, 2012	600	±4%	50%	38%	—	10%
Rasmussen Reports	October 11, 2012	500	±4.5%	51%	39%	3%	7%
Angus Reid Public Opinion	October 18–20, 2012	551	±4.2%	59%	39%	3%	—
EPIC-MRA	October 26–29, 2012	600	±4%	54%	33%	4%	9%
Glengariff	October 27–29, 2012	600	±4%	52%	38%	—	10%
Public Policy Polling	October 31 – November 1, 2012	500	±4.4%	53%	40%	—	7%
Baydoun-Foster	November 2, 2012	1,913	±2.2%	50%	43%	3%	3%
Public Policy Polling	November 1–3, 2012	700	±3.7%	55%	42%	—	3%
Angus Reid Public Opinion	November 1–3, 2012	502	±4.4%	56%	43%	1%	—
Mitchell Research	November 4, 2012	1,305	±2.71%	55%	41%	—	4%

Hypothetical polling

Poll source	Date(s) administered	Sample size	Margin of error	Debbie Stabenow (D)	Clark Durant (R)	Other	Undecided
EPIC-MRA	November 13–16, 2011	600	±4.0%	51%	31%	—	18%
Public Policy Polling	February 10–12, 2012	560	±4.14%	50%	33%	—	16%
Public Policy Polling	May 24–27, 2012	500	±4.4%	53%	31%	—	16%
Public Policy Polling	July 21–23, 2012	579	±4.1%	51%	34%	—	15%
Public Policy Polling	July 21–23, 2012	579	±4.1%	51%	34%	—	15%
Rasmussen Reports	July 23, 2012	500	±4.5%	47%	39%	4%	10%

Poll source	Date(s) administered	Sample size	Margin of error	Debbie Stabenow (D)	Scotty Boman (L)	Other	Undecided
Gravis Marketing	October 5–6, 2012	970	±3.2%	49%	39%	—	22%

Poll source	Date(s) administered	Sample size	Margin of error	Debbie Stabenow (D)	Randy Hekman (R)	Other	Undecided
Public Policy Polling	March 18–20, 2011	502	±4.4%	52%	33%	—	15%
Public Policy Polling	July 21–24, 2011	593	±4.0%	52%	36%	—	12%

Poll source	Date(s) administered	Sample size	Margin of error	Debbie Stabenow (D)	Peter Konetchy (R)	Other	Undecided
Public Policy Polling	July 21–24, 2011	593	±4.0%	52%	31%	—	18%

Poll source	Date(s) administered	Sample size	Margin of error	Debbie Stabenow (D)	Tim Leuliette (R)	Other	Undecided
Public Policy Polling	December 3–6, 2010	1,224	±2.8%	47%	30%	—	24%

Poll source	Date(s) administered	Sample size	Margin of error	Debbie Stabenow (D)	Saul Anuzis (R)	Other	Undecided
Public Policy Polling	March 18–20, 2011	502	±4.4%	52%	35%	—	13%

Poll source	Date(s) administered	Sample size	Margin of error	Debbie Stabenow (D)	John Engler (R)	Other	Undecided
Public Policy Polling	December 3–6, 2010	1,224	±2.8%	49%	42%	—	9%

Poll source	Date(s) administered	Sample size	Margin of error	Debbie Stabenow (D)	Terri Lynn Land (R)	Other	Undecided
Public Policy Polling	December 3–6, 2010	1,224	±2.8%	45%	41%	—	14%
Public Policy Polling	March 18–20, 2011	502	±4.4%	48%	38%	—	14%

Poll source	Date(s) administered	Sample size	Margin of error	Debbie Stabenow (D)	John McCulloch (R)	Other	Undecided
Public Policy Polling	July 21–24, 2011	593	±4.0%	52%	32%	—	16%

Poll source	Date(s) administered	Sample size	Margin of error	Debbie Stabenow (D)	Candice Miller (R)	Other	Undecided
Public Policy Polling	December 3–6, 2010	1,224	±2.8%	43%	41%	—	15%

=== Results ===
United States Senate election in Michigan, 2012
Party	Candidate	Votes	%	±%
Democratic	Debbie Stabenow (incumbent)	2,735,826	58.80%	+1.89%
Republican	Pete Hoekstra	1,767,386	37.98%	−3.28%
Libertarian	Scott Boman	84,480	1.82%	+1.11%
Green	Harley Mikkelson	27,890	0.60%	−0.03%
Constitution	Richard Matkin	26,038	0.56%	+0.07%
Natural Law	John Litle	11,229	0.24%	N/A
Write-in		69	0.00%	N/A
Total votes		4,652,918	100.00%	N/A
Democratic hold				

==== Counties that flipped from Democratic to Republican ====
- Midland (largest city: Midland)
- Cass (largest city: Dowagiac)
- Branch (largest city: Coldwater)
- Charlevoix (largest city: Boyne City)
- Oceana (largest city: Hart)

==== Counties that flipped from Republican to Democratic ====
- Wexford (largest city: Cadillac)
- Sanilac (largest city: Sandusky)

==== By congressional district ====
Stabenow won 12 of 14 congressional districts, including seven that elected Republicans.

District	Stabenow	Hoekstra	Representative
1st	52.3%	44.4%	Dan Benishek
2nd	44.7%	52.2%	
2nd	44.7%	52.2%	Bill Huizenga
3rd	48.0%	48.6%	Justin Amash
4th	53.0%	43.6%	Dave Camp
5th	66.7%	30.2%	Dale Kildee (112th Congress)
5th	66.7%	30.2%	Dan Kildee (113th Congress)
6th	50.2%	46.2%	Fred Upton
7th	53.4%	43.1%	Tim Walberg
8th	52.4%	44.2%	Mike Rogers
9th	63.0%	33.5%	Gary Peters (112th Congress)
9th	63.0%	33.5%	Sander Levin (113th Congress)
10th	54.0%	42.8%	Candice Miller
11th	51.5%	45.3%	David Curson (112th Congress)
11th	51.5%	45.3%	Kerry Bentivolio (113th Congress)
12th	69.7%	26.7%	Sander Levin (112th Congress)
12th	69.7%	26.7%	John Dingell (113th Congress)
13th	86.3%	11.1%	Hansen Clarke (112th Congress)
13th	86.3%	11.1%	John Conyers (113th Congress)
14th	82.1%	15.9%	John Conyers (112th Congress)
14th	82.1%	15.9%	Gary Peters (113th Congress)

== See also ==
- 2012 United States Senate elections
- 2012 United States House of Representatives elections in Michigan
