= Andrew Byerly Birge =

American attorney

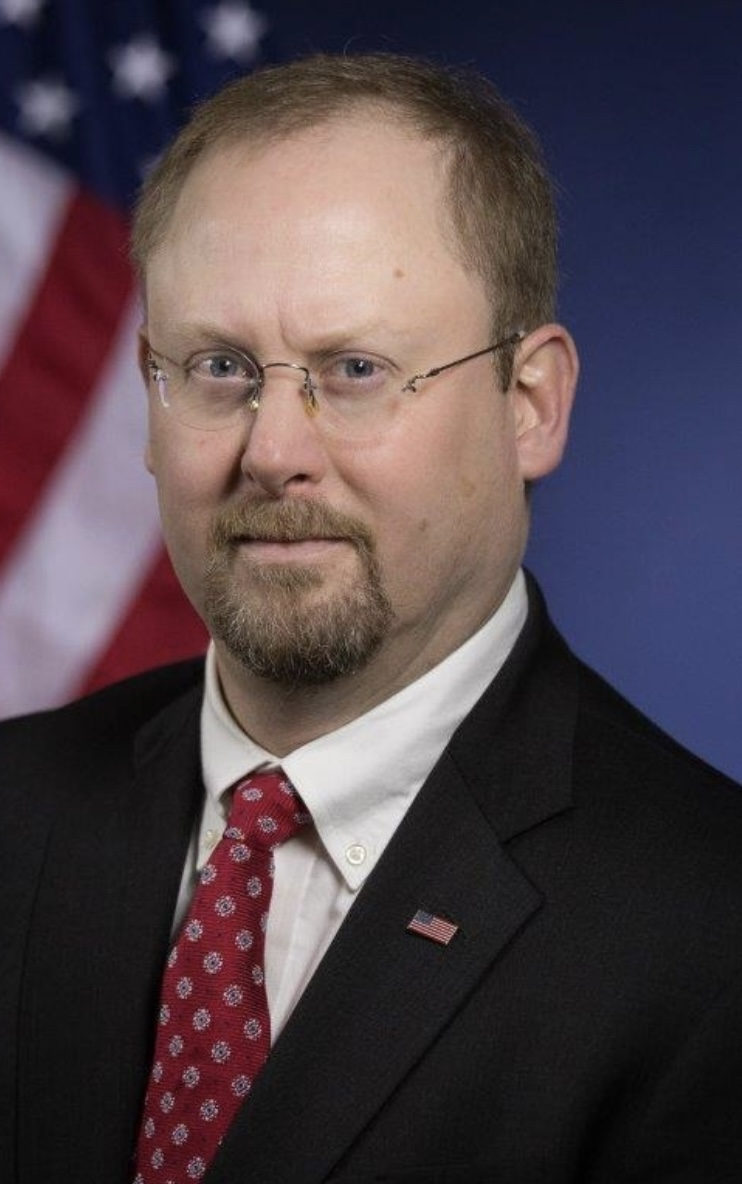
Official photo U.S. Attorney Birge

Andrew Byerly Birge is an American attorney who had served as the acting, interim and court-appointed U.S. attorney for the Western District of Michigan from January 2017 to May 2022, and as the acting U.S. attorney from January to June 2025. He served for the entirety of President Donald Trump's first term, the first third of President Joseph Biden's term, and the first five months of President Trump's second term. An acting U.S. attorney serves for a short duration by virtue of their senior position in the office upon a vacancy in the U.S. attorney position, and here Birge was also subsequently appointed interim U.S. attorney by Attorney General Jeff Sessions in November of 2017 and then appointed U.S. attorney by the U.S. District Court for the Western District of Michigan on March 16, 2018. He served until his Presidentially nominated and Senate-confirmed successor, Mark Totten, was sworn in on May 5, 2022.

== Biography ==
Birge completed a BA (cum laude; with distinction, History) at Carleton College (1989). A JD followed at Columbia University School of Law (1994; a Harlan Fiske Stone Scholar).

He began his career as a law clerk to Chief U.S. District Court Judge Richard Alan Enslen in Kalamazoo, Michigan. Then a four year stint as an associate with a major law firm in Chicago followed before joining the U.S. Attorney's Office in Grand Rapids (2000).

With the U.S. Attorney's Office for five years, Birge prosecuted criminal cases, including first degree murder, before assuming oversight of the office's appellate practice.

In 2007, U.S. Attorney Charles Gross promoted Birge to the position of first assistant U.S. attorney. A first assistant functions as the chief advisor to the U.S. attorney and oversees the office's criminal and civil litigation as well its administrative operations. Birge continued in that role for ten years under U.S. attorneys Don Davis and Patrick Miles.

== U.S. Attorney tenure ==
As U.S. attorney, Birge: increased staffing by 15% percent, prosecuted 22% more defendants than in prior years and, consistent with Administration priorities, raised firearm prosecutions under the Project Safe Neighborhoods initiative over 70%, increased drug prosecutions over 30%, with a higher number of defendants per case than at any time in the prior 13 years, while maintaining an overall a conviction rate of 94%. Bank fraud, federal program fraud, health care fraud, identity theft and human trafficking also featured prominently in the office's pursuits.

Notable cases during Birge's tenure included: the conviction and 60-year sentence on child pornography offenses of Larry Nassar, physician to college athletes and the women's Olympic gymnastics team; the conviction of four conspirators in a plot to kidnap the Governor of Michigan; and a record $7.75M settlement with Mclaren Health Care Corp. to resolve alleged Controlled Substances Act violations.

Notable community engagement and outreach efforts included: opioid awareness for highschoolers, forums with parolees on the human consequences of gun violence and of re-offending, "round table" meetings with community representatives to raise trust in law enforcement, in-person government-to-government meetings with the leaders of the 11 Tribes in the district, and a first-of-its-kind set of protocols to address multi-jurisdictional law enforcement responses to missing and murdered indigenous persons.

As U.S. attorney, Birge served on three working groups for the Attorney General's Advisory Committee: opioids, Native American issues and border security.
