= Michigan's 14th congressional district =

U.S. House district for Michigan

Coordinates: 42°23′21″N 82°55′19″W

- Obsolete district
- Created: 1930
- Eliminated: 2020
- Years active: 1933–2023

Michigan's 14th congressional district was a congressional district that stretched from eastern Detroit westward to Farmington Hills, then north to the suburb of Pontiac. From 1993 to 2013, it was based entirely in Wayne County.

It was last represented by Brenda Lawrence.

According to Michigan's law on redistricting, the highest numbered district must be in the southeast corner of the state. However, despite being the highest numbered district, the 14th district was not in the southeast corner of the state during its final decade of existence; the 7th district was.

After the 2020 U.S. census, Michigan's 14th district was removed in the 2020 United States redistricting cycle.

== Future ==
The district became obsolete, after the 2022 United States House of Representatives elections, as Michigan lost one district, due to reapportionment after the 2020 United States census.

== Election results from statewide races ==
Year	Office	Results
2008	President	Obama 82% - 17%
2012	President	Obama 81% - 19%
2012	Senate	Stabenow 82% - 16%
2014	Senate	Peters 80% - 18%
2014	Governor	Schauer 71% - 28%
2014	Secretary of State	Dillard 71% - 27%
2014	Attorney General	Totten 73% - 25%
2016	President	Clinton 79% - 18%
2018	Senate	Stabenow 79% - 20%
2018	Governor	Whitmer 80% - 18%
2018	Attorney General	Nessel 78% - 19%
2020	President	Biden 80% - 20%
2020	Senate	Peters 78% - 20%

== History ==
In the 1960s, the 14th congressional district consisted of Hamtramck, the northeast portion of Detroit, Harper Woods and the Grosse Pointes. The 1964 redistricting that created these boundaries placed Lucien Nedzi, who had represented the old 14th district, in the same congressional district as fellow Democratic incumbent Harold Ryan. Nedzi was the more liberal of the two Democrats, and won the primary. In the 1972 redistricting, East Detroit and Warren south of 10 Mile Road were added to the district while some of the district in Detroit was moved to other districts. Prior to the 1972 redistricting, the majority of voters in the district were residents of Detroit. The 1972 redistricting changed the district from having a population based on the 1970 census that was 10% African American to one that was 3% African American, what with 70,000 or more residents added from East Detroit and Warren, with the latter city as a place where black families could in 1970 literally be counted with one's fingers.

At the same time, the percentage of people who were either immigrants or had at least one parent who was an immigrant fell from 46% to 37%. This was more a reflection of the fact that the residents of Warren and East Detroit at the time were in many cases literally the children and grandchildren of the residents of north-east Detroit and Hamtramck. Those born in Poland or with at least one parent born there fell from 12% to 9% of the population, the same group for Canadians fell from 7% to 6% the Italian group held steady at 6% while the German group actually rose from 4% to 6%. Since all these figures are based on the 1970 census, the changes reflect differences between the areas added and dropped, not any population movement. Based on the 1970 census, the district had the most people who identified having Belgian ancestry of any congressional district in the country, and one of the most heavily Polish as well. Based on the 1970 census, it was possible to write that Hamtramck was "an almost entirely Polish-American city".

From 1982 until the 1992 redistricting, the 14th congressional district included the northeast Detroit (basically north of 6 mile and east of Ryan), Grosse Pointe Farms, Grosse Point Woods, Grosse Pointe Shores, Hamtramck, Harper Woods, the southern third of St. Clair Shores, Eastpointe, Center Line, Warren south of 10 mile and west of Van Dyke, all of Sterling Heights, Utica, Hazel Park, Madison Heights, and Troy south of about Big Beaver Road, and west of Rochester Road. The district was represented by Dennis Hertel.

Conyers' 1st district included Highland Park, and Detroit between the Southfield Freeway and a line running from the south end of Highland Park over to the boundary with Dearborn. The eastern boundary of the district was with the 14th district and the northern boundary was 8 mile road.

All of the Wayne County portion of the 14th was retained in the 14th in the 1992 redistricting. It also retained most of the district area in Detroit from Conyers' old 1st district and all of Highland Park. In addition, it took in the far north-western part of Detroit and Redford Township from the 17th district, which prior to redistricting was represented by Sander Levin, and after 1992 did not exist (since there were only 16 districts). The south end of St. Clair Shores and about 80% of Eastpointe were put in the district that ended up being David Bonior's district, while the rest of Eastpointe, as well as the remaining areas in Warren, Center Line, Maidson Heights, Hazel Park, Sterling Heights, Utica and Troy were merged into the district that ended up represented by the 17th district's representative Sander Levin, renumbered as the 12th post-redistricting.

== Demographic history ==
The change over time in the congressional district can be seen by what has happened in the one place that has remained constantly in the district since the 1960s, Hamtramck. Hamtramck is no longer a mainly Polish city. 20% of the population is East Indian or Bangladeshi, 19% is black or African American, and almost five percent reports multiple races. Of the 53% that is "white" according to the broad definition used by the Census Bureau, Albanians are the most numerous sub-group, with large numbers of Yemenis and Bosnians as well. It is possible that close to half the population is Muslim.

The percentage of African Americans in the 2010 boundaries of the district had fallen from 61% to 59% between censuses, largely as a result of growth in the Arab population in Dearborn, combined with migration into Macomb and Oakland counties, as well as migration to Macomb, Oakland and suburban Wayne County, as well as out of Michigan entirely, from the Detroit and Highland Park portions of the district. Even the white population (including the large Arab populations in Hamtramck and Dearborn among others that rarely self-identify as white and clearly see themselves as distinct ethnic groups) within the district boundaries had declines by just over 23,000. At the same time those groups that were grouped under the heading "Asia" by the census saw their population in the district boundaries rise by a net of 2,000 during the 2010s, largely fueled by the growth of the Bangladeshi population in Hamtramck.

== 2012 election ==
After the 2010 census, the 14th was reconfigured to take in much of eastern Detroit and the Grosse Pointes. It was also pushed westward into Oakland County to include Southfield, Farmington Hills and Pontiac. For all intents and purposes, this was the successor to the old 13th district. Meanwhile, most of the old 14th became the new 13th.

The 13th's freshman congressman, Hansen Clarke, had his home drawn into the new 13th, but opted to follow most of his constituents into the new 14th. In the Democratic primary for this hybrid urban-suburban district, Clarke faced fellow congressman Gary Peters, whose 9th district had been eliminated in redistricting, as well as Southfield mayor Brenda Lawrence and two other Democrats. Preliminary reports showed Peters, who had previously represented part of the Oakland County portion of the district, winning with 47% of the vote to Clarke's 35% and Lawrence's 13%.

== List of members representing the district ==
Member	Party	Years	Cong ress	Electoral history	District boundaries
District created March 4, 1933
Carl M. Weideman (Detroit)	Democratic	March 4, 1933 – January 3, 1935	73rd	Elected in 1932. Lost renomination.	1933–1953 [data missing]
Louis C. Rabaut (Detroit)	Democratic	January 3, 1935 – January 3, 1947	74th 75th 76th 77th 78th 79th	Elected in 1934. Re-elected in 1936; Re-elected in 1938. Re-elected in 1940. Re-elected in 1942. Re-elected in 1944. Lost re-election.	1933–1953 [data missing]
Harold F. Youngblood (Detroit)	Republican	January 3, 1947 – January 3, 1949	80th	Elected in 1946. Lost re-election.	1933–1953 [data missing]
Louis C. Rabaut (Grosse Pointe Park)	Democratic	January 3, 1949 – November 12, 1961	81st 82nd 83rd 84th 85th 86th 87th	Elected in 1948. Re-elected in 1950. Re-elected in 1952. Re-elected in 1954. Re-elected in 1956. Re-elected in 1958. Re-elected in 1960. Died.	1933–1953 [data missing]
Louis C. Rabaut (Grosse Pointe Park)	Democratic	January 3, 1949 – November 12, 1961	81st 82nd 83rd 84th 85th 86th 87th	Elected in 1948. Re-elected in 1950. Re-elected in 1952. Re-elected in 1954. Re-elected in 1956. Re-elected in 1958. Re-elected in 1960. Died.	1953–1965 [data missing]
Vacant		November 12, 1961 – February 13, 1962	87th		1953–1965 [data missing]
Harold M. Ryan (Detroit)	Democratic	February 13, 1962 – January 3, 1965	87th 88th	Elected to finish Rabaut's term. Re-elected in 1962. Lost renomination.	1953–1965 [data missing]
Lucien Nedzi (Detroit)	Democratic	January 3, 1965 – January 3, 1981	89th 90th 91st 92nd 93rd 94th 95th 96th	Redistricted from the 1st district and re-elected in 1964. Re-elected in 1966. Re-elected in 1968. Re-elected in 1970. Re-elected in 1972. Re-elected in 1974. Re-elected in 1976. Re-elected in 1978. Retired.	1965–1973 [data missing]
Lucien Nedzi (Detroit)	Democratic	January 3, 1965 – January 3, 1981	89th 90th 91st 92nd 93rd 94th 95th 96th	Redistricted from the 1st district and re-elected in 1964. Re-elected in 1966. Re-elected in 1968. Re-elected in 1970. Re-elected in 1972. Re-elected in 1974. Re-elected in 1976. Re-elected in 1978. Retired.	1973–1983 [data missing]
Dennis Hertel (Harper Woods)	Democratic	January 3, 1981 – January 3, 1993	97th 98th 99th 100th 101st 102nd	Elected in 1980. Re-elected in 1982. Re-elected in 1984. Re-elected in 1986. Re-elected in 1988. Re-elected in 1990. Retired.	1973–1983 [data missing]
Dennis Hertel (Harper Woods)	Democratic	January 3, 1981 – January 3, 1993	97th 98th 99th 100th 101st 102nd	Elected in 1980. Re-elected in 1982. Re-elected in 1984. Re-elected in 1986. Re-elected in 1988. Re-elected in 1990. Retired.	1983–1993 [data missing]
John Conyers (Detroit)	Democratic	January 3, 1993 – January 3, 2013	103rd 104th 105th 106th 107th 108th 109th 110th 111th 112th	Redistricted from the 1st district and re-elected in 1992. Re-elected in 1994. Re-elected in 1996. Re-elected in 1998. Re-elected in 2000. Re-elected in 2002. Re-elected in 2004. Re-elected in 2006. Re-elected in 2008. Re-elected in 2010. Redistricted to the 13th district.	1993–2003
John Conyers (Detroit)	Democratic	January 3, 1993 – January 3, 2013	103rd 104th 105th 106th 107th 108th 109th 110th 111th 112th	Redistricted from the 1st district and re-elected in 1992. Re-elected in 1994. Re-elected in 1996. Re-elected in 1998. Re-elected in 2000. Re-elected in 2002. Re-elected in 2004. Re-elected in 2006. Re-elected in 2008. Re-elected in 2010. Redistricted to the 13th district.	2003–2013
Gary Peters (Bloomfield Township)	Democratic	January 3, 2013 – January 3, 2015	113th	Redistricted from the 9th district and re-elected in 2012. Retired to run for U.S. senator.	2013–2023
Brenda Lawrence (Southfield)	Democratic	January 3, 2015 – January 3, 2023	114th 115th 116th 117th	Elected in 2014. Re-elected in 2016. Re-elected in 2018. Re-elected in 2020. Redistricted to the 12th district and retired.	2013–2023
District eliminated January 3, 2023

== Recent election results ==
=== 2012 ===
Michigan's 14th congressional district, 2012
Party	Candidate	Votes	%
Democratic	Gary Peters (incumbent)	270,450	82.3
Republican	John Hauler	51,395	15.6
Libertarian	Leonard Schwartz	3,968	1.2
Green	Douglas Campbell	2,979	0.9
Total votes		328,792	100.0
Democratic hold			

=== 2014 ===
Michigan's 14th congressional district, 2014
Party	Candidate	Votes	%
Democratic	Brenda Lawrence	165,272	77.8
Republican	Christina Barr	41,801	19.7
Libertarian	Leonard Schwartz	3,366	1.6
Green	Stephen Boyle	1,999	0.9
Independent	Calvin Pruden (write-in)	30	0.0
Total votes		212,468	100.0
Democratic hold			

=== 2016 ===
Michigan's 14th congressional district, 2016
Party	Candidate	Votes	%
Democratic	Brenda Lawrence (incumbent)	244,135	78.5
Republican	Howard Klausner	58,103	18.7
Libertarian	Gregory Creswell	4,893	1.6
Green	Marcia Squier	3,843	1.2
Total votes		310,974	100.0
Democratic hold			

=== 2018 ===
Michigan's 14th congressional district, 2018
Party	Candidate	Votes	%
Democratic	Brenda Lawrence (incumbent)	214,334	80.9
Republican	Marc Herschfus	45,899	17.3
Working Class	Philip Kolodny	4,761	1.8
Total votes		264,994	100.0
Democratic hold			

=== 2020 ===
Michigan's 14th congressional district, 2020
Party	Candidate	Votes	%
Democratic	Brenda Lawrence (incumbent)	271,370	79.3
Republican	Robert Patrick	62,664	18.3
Libertarian	Lisa Lane Gioia	3,737	1.1
Working Class	Philip Kolody	2,534	0.7
Green	Clyde Shabazz	1,998	0.6
Total votes		342,303	100.0
Democratic hold			

== Historical district boundaries ==
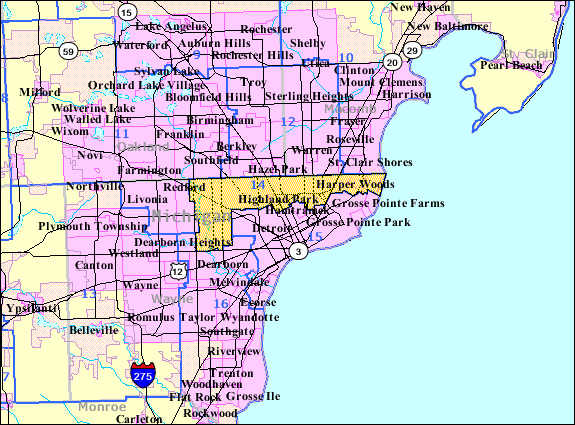
1993 - 2003

2003 - 2013

== See also ==
- Michigan's congressional districts
- List of United States congressional districts
