= 1990 United States Senate election in Michigan =

United States Senate state election in 1990

- November 6, 1990
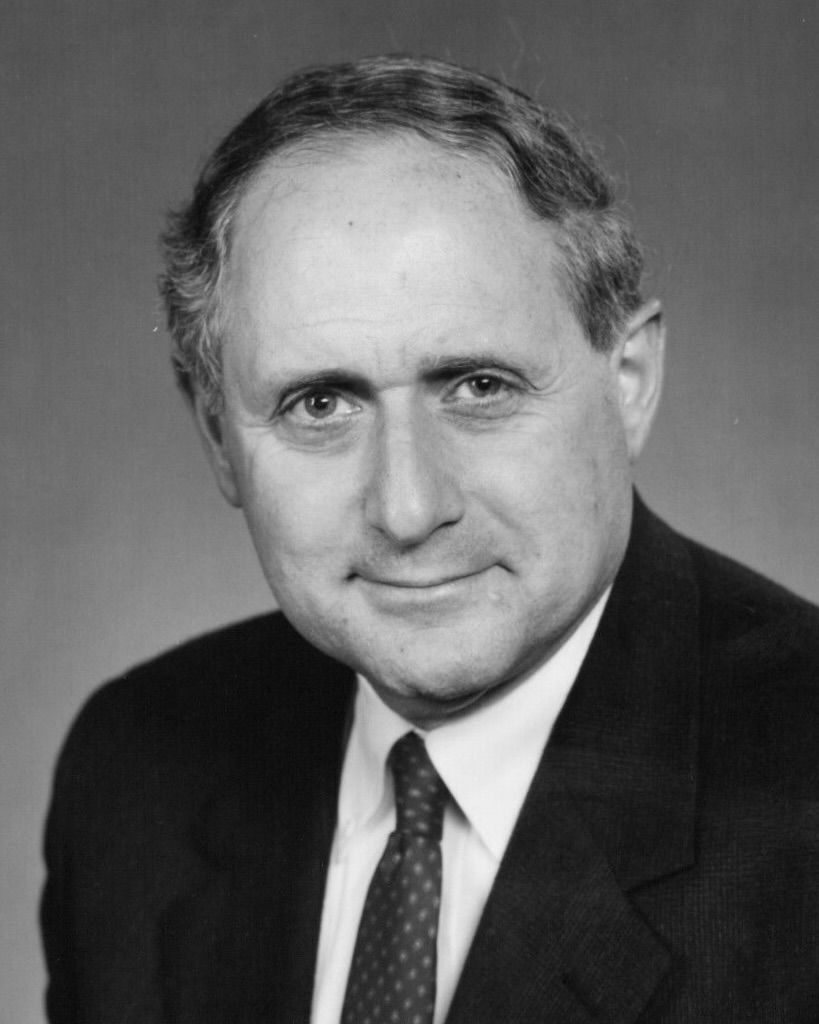

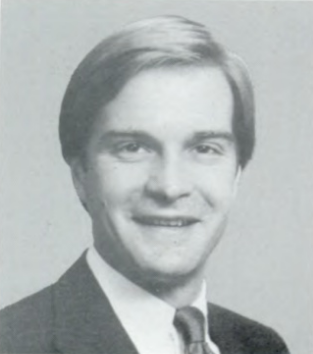
Nominee	Carl Levin	Bill Schuette
Party	Democratic	Republican
Popular vote	1,471,753	1,055,695
Percentage	57.47%	41.23%
- County results Levin: 40–50% 50–60% 60–70% 70–80% Schuette: 40–50% 50–60% 60–70%
U.S. senator before election
Carl Levin
Democratic
Elected U.S. Senator
Carl Levin
Democratic

The 1990 United States Senate election in Michigan was held on November 6, 1990. Incumbent Democratic U.S. Senator Carl Levin won re-election to a third term against future Michigan attorney general Bill Schuette, who was still serving as Michigan's 10th district representative.

== Candidates ==
=== Democratic ===
- Carl Levin, incumbent U.S. Senator

=== Republican ===
- Clark Durant, attorney and founder of Cornerstone Schools
- Bill Schuette, U.S. representative

=== Workers World ===
- Susan Farquhar

== Results ==
=== Primary election results ===
The primary elections were held on August 7.

Democratic primary election results
Party	Candidate	Votes	%
Democratic	Carl Levin (incumbent)	355,373	99.99%
Write-in		27	0.00%
Total votes		355,400	100.0%

Republican primary election results
Party	Candidate	Votes	%
Republican	Bill Schuette	270,434	59.69%
Republican	Clark Durant	182,592	40.30%
Write-in		9	0.00%
Total votes		453,035	100.0%

=== General election results ===
General election results
Party	Candidate	Votes	%
Democratic	Carl Levin (incumbent)	1,471,753	57.47%
Republican	Bill Schuette	1,055,695	41.23%
Workers World	Susan Farquhar	32,796	1.28%
Write-in		250	0.00%
Total votes		2,560,494	100.0%
Democratic hold			

== See also ==
- 1990 United States Senate elections
