= Carl M. Weideman =

American politician (1898–1972)

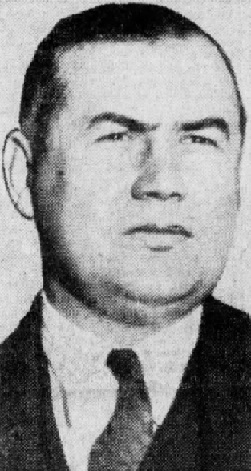
- Detroit Free Press, November 10, 1932

Member of the U.S. House of Representatives from Michigan's 14th district
- In office March 4, 1933 – January 3, 1935
- Preceded by: District created
- Succeeded by: Louis C. Rabaut

Personal details
- Born: March 5, 1898 Detroit, Michigan, U.S.
- Died: March 5, 1972 (aged 74) Grosse Pointe Park, Michigan, U.S.
- Resting place: Woodlawn Cemetery, Detroit, Michigan
- Party: Democratic
- Education: Detroit College of Law; University of Michigan
- Profession: Attorney

Carl May Weideman (March 5, 1898 – March 5, 1972) was a naval officer, politician and jurist from the U.S. state of Michigan.

== Biography ==
Weideman was born of German ancestry in Detroit, Michigan and attended the public schools. He also attended the University of Michigan at Ann Arbor from 1914 until the outbreak of the First World War. He attended the Naval Officers Training School at Ann Arbor and enlisted in the United States Navy as an apprentice seaman. He was a member of the United States Naval Reserve from 1918 to 1922. He attended the Detroit College of Law. He received his LL.B. from that institution in 1921. He had been admitted to the bar in 1920 and commenced practice in Detroit. He was a delegate to the Democratic State conventions 1932-1944 and to the 1940 Democratic National Convention.

In 1932, Weideman was elected as a Democrat from the Michigan's newly created 14th congressional district to the 73rd Congress, serving from March 4, 1933, to January 3, 1935, in the U.S. House. He lost in the 1934 Democratic primary election to Louis C. Rabaut. During his term in Congress, Weideman was a member of the McCormack-Dickstein Committee, which investigated the Business Plot conspiracy to overthrow President Franklin Delano Roosevelt.

After leaving Congress, Weideman resumed the practice of law in Detroit. He was elected circuit court commissioner of Wayne County in 1936, 1942, and 1948, and served from January 1, 1937, to April 30, 1950. The day after leaving that office, he served as circuit judge for the third judicial circuit of Michigan until September 15, 1968.

Carl M. Weideman was a Lutheran and a member of the American Legion, the Freemasons, and the Odd Fellows. He resided in Grosse Pointe Park, Michigan where he died on his 74th birthday. He is interred in Woodlawn Cemetery.

U.S. House of Representatives
| Preceded by None | United States Representative for the 14th Congressional District of Michigan; 1933 – 1935 | Succeeded by Louis C. Rabaut |
