= Mark Totten =

American lawyer

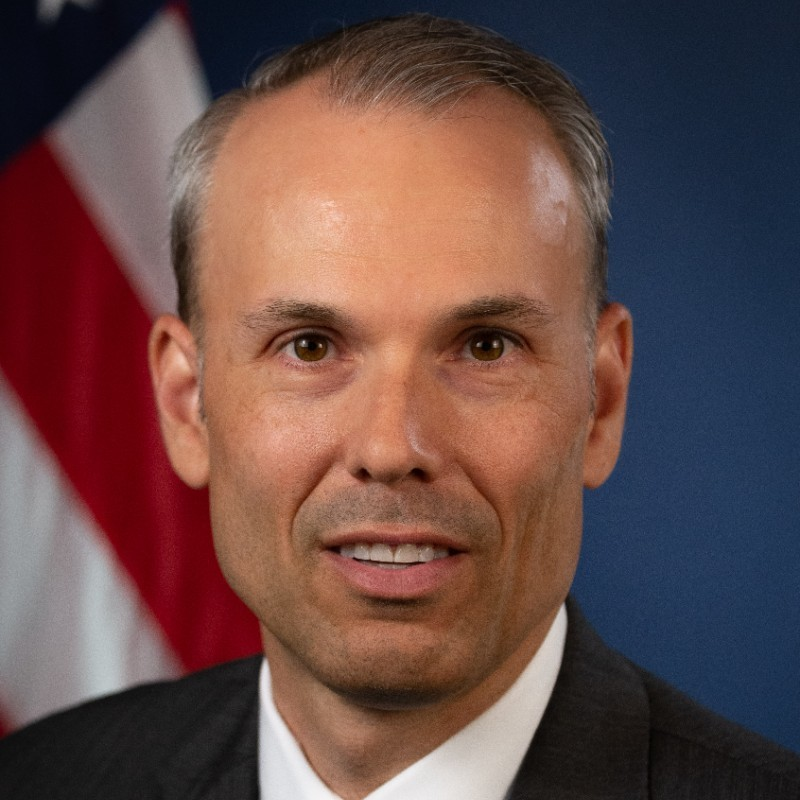

United States Attorney for the Western District of Michigan
- In office May 5, 2022 – January 20, 2025
- President: Joe Biden
- Preceded by: Andrew Birge
- Succeeded by: Andrew Birge (acting)

Personal details
- Born: Mark Allen Totten; March 7, 1974 (age 52) Kalamazoo, Michigan, U.S.
- Party: Democratic
- Spouse: Kristin Totten
- Children: 2
- Education: Cedarville University (BA); Yale University (JD, PhD)

Mark Allan Totten (born March 7, 1974) is an American lawyer who served as the United States attorney for the Western District of Michigan between May 2022 and January 2025.

== Early life and education ==
A native of Kalamazoo, Michigan, Totten attended the Kalamazoo Public Schools. He earned a Bachelor of Arts degree in communications from Cedarville University in 1996, a Juris Doctor from Yale Law School, and a PhD in ethics from Yale University.

== Career ==
From 2007 to 2008, Totten served as a law clerk for Judge Thomas B. Griffith of the United States Court of Appeals for the District of Columbia Circuit. He also worked as an appellate staffer in the United States Department of Justice Civil Rights Division. From 2011 to 2013, he served as special assistant United States attorney in the United States Attorney's Office for the Western District of Michigan. Totten was the Democratic nominee in the 2014 Michigan Attorney General election, losing to incumbent Bill Schuette.

From 2016 to 2017, Totten was an assistant prosecuting attorney in the Office of the Genesee County Prosecuting Attorney. From 2008 to 2018, he was a professor at the Michigan State University College of Law. From 2019 to 2022, Totten served as chief legal counsel for Michigan Governor Gretchen Whitmer.

=== U.S. attorney for the Western District of Michigan ===
On November 12, 2021, President Joe Biden announced his intent to nominate Totten to serve as the United States attorney for the Western District of Michigan. On November 15, 2021, his nomination was sent to the United States Senate. On January 13, 2022, his nomination was reported out of the Senate Judiciary Committee. On April 27, 2022, his nomination was confirmed in the Senate by voice vote. He was sworn in on May 5, 2022. Due to a new president taking office, he resigned his position effective January 20, 2025.

== Personal life ==
Totten and his wife, Kristin, have two children.

Party political offices
| Preceded by David Leyton | Democratic nominee for Attorney General of Michigan; 2014 | Succeeded by Dana Nessel |
Legal offices
| Preceded by Andrew Byerly Birge | United States Attorney for the Western District of Michigan; 2022–present | Incumbent |
