= 2010 Michigan Attorney General election =

- November 2, 2010
- Turnout: 3,136,224
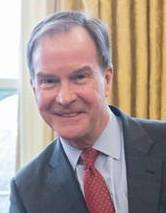

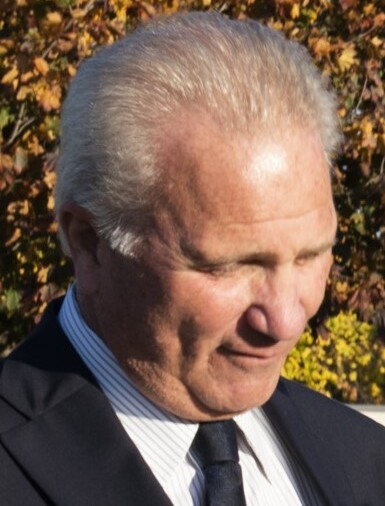
Nominee	Bill Schuette	David Leyton
Party	Republican	Democratic
Popular vote	1,649,223	1,363,486
Percentage	52.59%	43.48%
- County results Schuette: 50–60% 60–70% 70–80% Leyton: 40–50% 50–60% 60–70%
Attorney General before election
Mike Cox
Republican
Elected Attorney General
Bill Schuette
Republican

The 2010 Michigan Attorney General election took place on November 2, 2010, to elect the Attorney General of Michigan. Two-term incumbent Mike Cox was term-limited by the Michigan Constitution from seeking a third term. Republican Bill Schuette, a former Congressman, state Senator and judge of the Michigan Court of Appeals, defeated Genesee County Prosecutor David Leyton with 54 percent of the vote.

== Republican convention ==
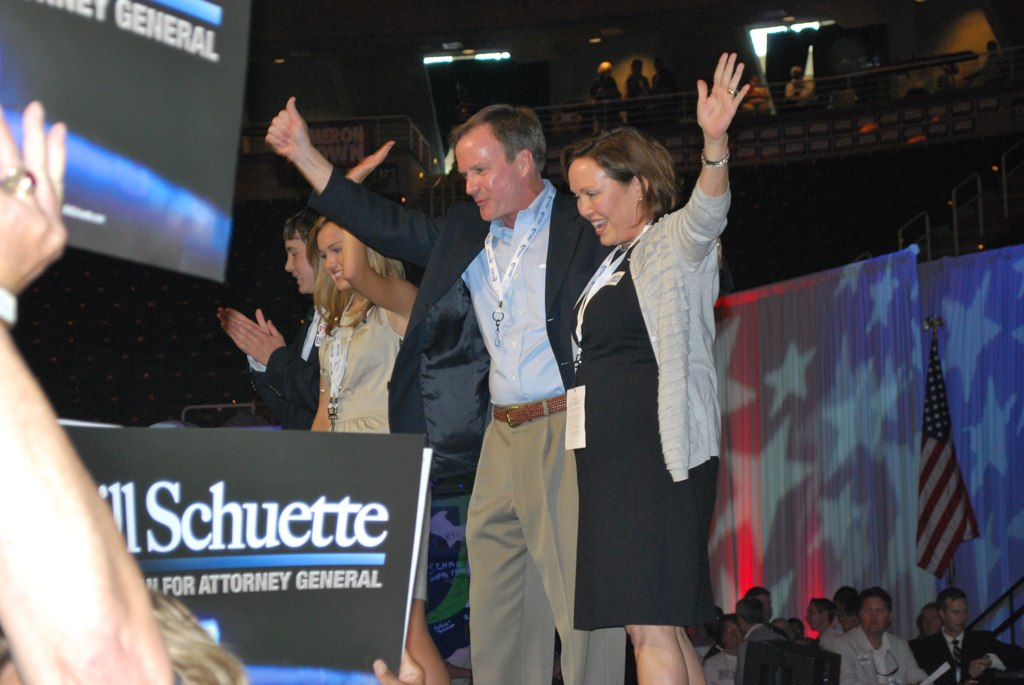
Schuette attending the 2010 Michigan Republican State Convention

=== Candidates ===
==== Nominee ====
- Bill Schuette, former U.S. Representative, Judge of the Michigan Court of Appeals and state Senator,

==== Eliminated at convention ====
- Mike Bishop, Majority Leader of the Michigan Senate

==== Withdrew ====
- Bruce Patterson, state Senator

Patterson, a term-limited state Senator, was the first to form a campaign, forming an exploratory campaign in January, though he did not compete for the nomination at the Republican Party Convention in August 2010. After being expected to win the nomination handily, Schuette defeated Bishop by 121 votes to secure the nomination.

== Democratic convention ==
=== Candidates ===
==== Nominee ====
- David Leyton, Genesee County Prosecutor

==== Withdrew ====
- Richard Bernstein, Attorney
- Gretchen Whitmer, state Senator

Despite filing for the race, both Bernstein and Whitmer withdrew before the state Democratic Party Convention and Leyton won the nomination uncontested.

== Minor parties ==
=== Libertarian Party ===
- Daniel W. Grow, attorney

=== U.S. Taxpayers Party ===
- Gerald Van Sickle, attorney, nominee for Attorney General of Michigan in 2002

== General election ==
=== Results ===
Michigan attorney general election, 2010
Party	Candidate	Votes	%	±%
Republican	Bill Schuette	1,649,223	52.59%	−1.29%
Democratic	David Leyton	1,363,486	43.48%	−0.03%
Libertarian	Daniel Grow	62,737	2.00%	+0.33%
U.S. Taxpayers	Gerald Van Sickle	60,778	1.94%	+0.95%
Majority		285,737	9.11%	−1.21%
Turnout		3,136,224		−0.15%
Republican hold		Swing		
