= Louis C. Rabaut =

American politician (1886–1961)

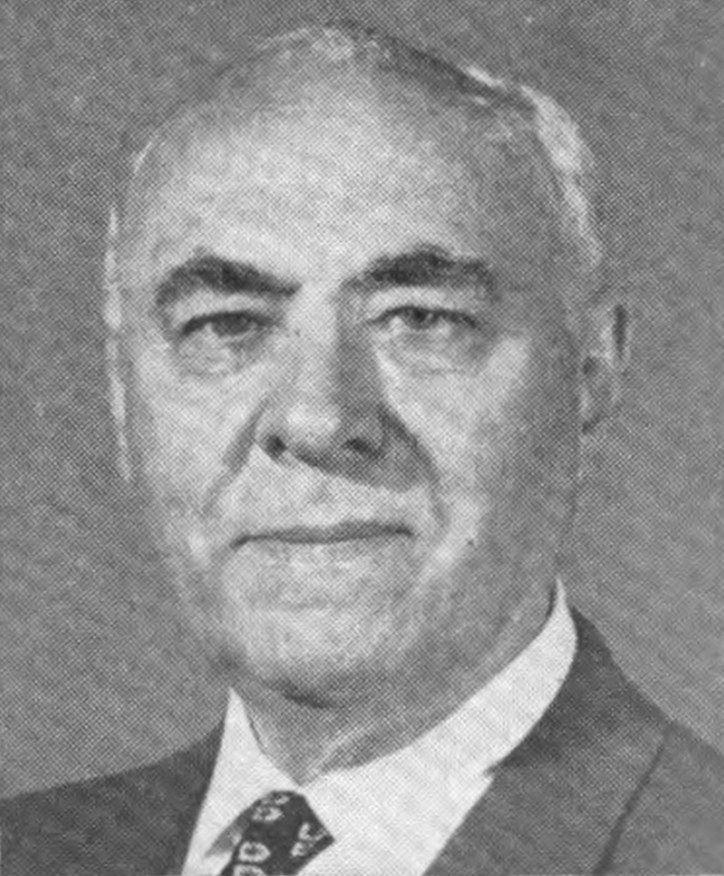

Member of the U.S. House of Representatives from Michigan's 14th district
- In office January 3, 1949 – November 12, 1961
- Preceded by: Harold F. Youngblood
- Succeeded by: Harold M. Ryan
- In office January 3, 1935 – January 3, 1947
- Preceded by: Carl M. Weideman
- Succeeded by: Harold F. Youngblood

Personal details
- Born: Louis Charles Rabaut; December 5, 1886 Detroit, Michigan, U.S.
- Died: November 12, 1961 (aged 74) Hamtramck, Michigan, U.S.
- Resting place: Mount Olivet Cemetery
- Party: Democratic
- Relatives: Tom Barrett (great-grandson)
- Education: Detroit College; Detroit College of Law
- Profession: Lawyer

Louis Charles Rabaut (December 5, 1886 – November 12, 1961) was an American lawyer and politician from the U.S. state of Michigan. He was a Democratic congressman representing Michigan's 14th congressional district from 1935 to 1947, and from 1949 to 1961.

He is best known for introducing legislation that added the words "under God" to the Pledge of Allegiance.

== Family and early life ==
Louis Charles Rabaut, the grandson of immigrants from Kortrijk, West Flanders, Belgium was born in Detroit, Michigan to Louis Aloysius and Clara Lenau Reid Rabaut, who operated a wholesale toy and fireworks store. In 1911, he married Stella Marie Petz, with whom he had nine children. Rabaut graduated from Detroit College in 1909 and from the Detroit College of Law in 1912. He was admitted to the bar in 1912 and commenced practice in Detroit.

== Political career ==
In 1934, Rabaut defeated incumbent Carl M. Weideman in the Democratic primary elections for the Michigan's 14th district to the U.S. House of Representatives. He went on to be elected to the 74th Congress and to the five succeeding Congresses, serving from January 3, 1935 to January 3, 1947. In 1946, he was defeated by Republican Harold F. Youngblood. He successfully regained his seat from Youngblood in 1948 to be elected to the 81st Congress and the six succeeding Congresses, serving from January 3, 1949 until his death on November 12, 1961.

In 1951, he argued for price controls, stating:

"This Eighty-second Congress stands at the threshold of immortality. We have an opportunity that few Congresses have to insure our place in history. If we deny to the Government the authority to roll back prices and maintain firm economic controls, we are sure to be remembered. We will be remembered by the American people as 'the horse-meat Congress' -- the Congress that put the old gray mare on the family dinner table."

=== Amending the Pledge of Allegiance ===
On April 20, 1953, prompted by a letter from Brooklyn resident H. Joseph Mahoney, Rabaut submitted a resolution to amend the Pledge of Allegiance with the words "under God". The practice had been adopted several years earlier by the Knights of Columbus. Rabaut's bill was the first of many similar efforts, culminating in Representative Charles Oakman and Senator Homer Ferguson's joint resolution in 1954. Speaking in support of the bill, Rabaut said:

You may argue from dawn to dusk about differing political, economic, and social systems, but the fundamental issue which is the unbridgeable gap between America and Communist Russia is a belief in Almighty God. From the root of atheism stems the evil weed of communism and its branches of materialism and political dictatorship. Unless we are willing to affirm our belief in the existence of God and His creator-creature relation to man, we drop man himself to the significance of a grain of sand and open the floodgates to tyranny and oppression.

The bill passed and was signed into law by President Dwight D. Eisenhower on June 14, Flag Day.

=== Final years ===
Reflecting on his time in Congress, Rabaut told an interviewer in 1959:

Why, we're the guinea pigs of the country. We have to go back to the country every two years and face the people. The senators can stay down here and do what they want for four years, and then get awful nice the last two years and rely on the short memory of the people.

=== Death ===
Rabaut died in Hamtramck, Michigan and was interred at Mount Olivet Cemetery in Detroit, Michigan. He was succeeded in office by Democrat Harold M. Ryan, who was elected in a special election on February 13, 1962.

== Memorials ==
Rabaut served as the Chair of the House Subcommittee on the District of Columbia from 1955 until his death in 1961. As a result, both a park and a Junior High School in the District of Columbia were named after him. Rabaut Park is located on Mt. Pleasant Street between 16th and Harvard Streets NW. Rabaut Junior High School was built at 100 Peabody Street, NW in 1966. It was closed in the 1990s, and in 2012 became the home of Capital City Public Charter School.

== See also ==
- List of members of the United States Congress who died in office (1950–1999)

U.S. House of Representatives
Preceded by Carl M. Weideman	United States Representative for the 14th congressional district of Michigan; 1935–1947	Succeeded by Harold F. Youngblood
Preceded by Harold F. Youngblood	United States Representative for the 14th congressional district of Michigan; 1949–1961	Succeeded by Harold M. Ryan
