= Harold F. Youngblood =

American politician (1907–1983)

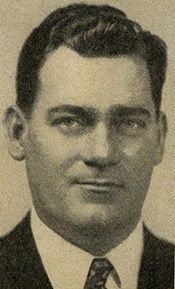

Member of the U.S. House of Representatives from Michigan's 14th district
- In office January 3, 1947 – January 3, 1949
- Preceded by: Louis C. Rabaut
- Succeeded by: Louis C. Rabaut

Personal details
- Born: August 7, 1907 Detroit, Michigan, U.S.
- Died: May 10, 1983 (aged 75) Tucson, Arizona, U.S.
- Party: Republican
- Education: St. Joseph’s Commercial College

Harold Francis Youngblood (August 7, 1907 – May 10, 1983) was a politician from the U.S. state of Michigan. He served one term in the United States House of Representatives from 1947 to 1949. Alongside Howard A. Coffin, he remains the last Republican to represent any part of Detroit in Congress, as of 2024. Both men were elected in the Republican wave year of 1946, only to lose re-election two years later in 1948.

== Early life and career ==
Youngblood was born in Detroit, Michigan, attended the public schools, and graduated from St. Joseph's Commercial College in 1927. He was employed in Detroit office of the Michigan Secretary of State in 1927 and 1928. He was also a member of staff of Wayne County Board of Auditors from 1928 to 1935. In 1934 he ran for Congress, and was defeated by Louis C. Rabaut. He later engaged as a plumbing and heating contractor in 1940.

== Congress ==
In 1947, Youngblood unseated Rabaut, and was elected as a Republican from Michigan's 14th congressional district to the 80th Congress, serving from January 3, 1947 to January 3, 1949 in the U.S. House. He was an unsuccessful candidate for reelection in 1948 to the 81st Congress when Rabaut returned to defeat him. He lost at four more attempts against his rival in 1948, 1950, 1952, and 1956.

== After Congress ==
After leaving Congress, he served as special assistant to the Director of Foreign Operations Administration in the Berlin area in 1954 and 1955. He was an unsuccessful candidate for Michigan House of Representatives from Wayne County (1st District) in 1958. He then engaged in construction contracting.

== Personal life ==
Youngblood was a Catholic and a member of Elks, and Lions. He was a resident of Tucson, Arizona until his death and is interred there in East Lawn Cemetery.

== See also ==
- List of members of the House Un-American Activities Committee

U.S. House of Representatives
| Preceded by Louis C. Rabaut | Member of the United States House of Representatives from Michigan's 14th congressional district 1947–1949 | Succeeded by Louis C. Rabaut |
