= Clark Durant =

American businessman

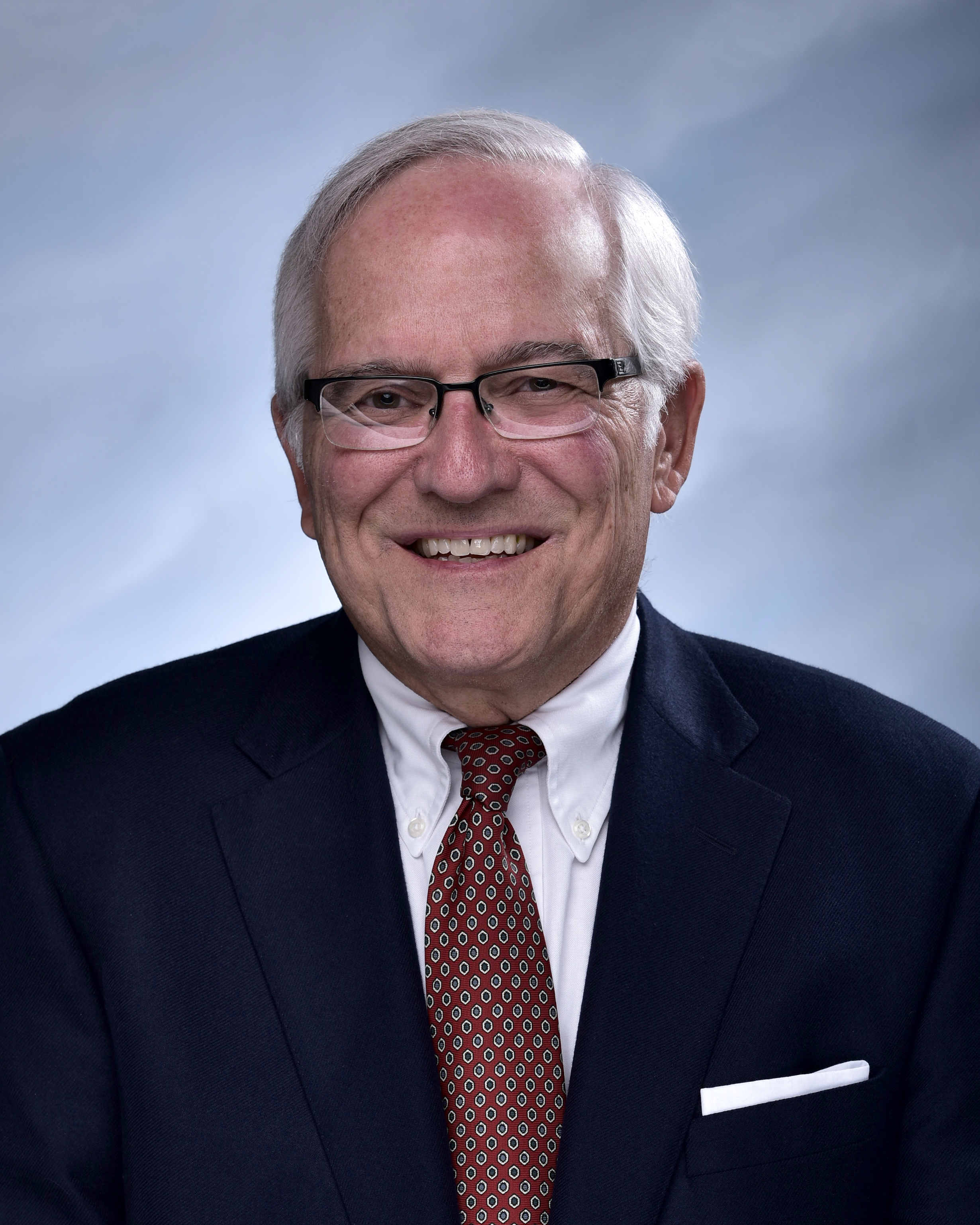
- Born: May 13, 1949 (age 77); Detroit, Michigan, United States
- Occupations: Educator; Attorney
- Political party: Republican Party

Wiliam Clark Durant III (born May 13, 1949) is an American businessman who is the co-founder and former CEO of the Cornerstone Schools, a group of charter and independent schools in the inner city of Detroit. Durant was a Republican politician in the state of Michigan, and was a candidate for the U.S. Senate in 2012.

== Early life ==
Durant was born in Detroit, Michigan. He attended Tulane University in New Orleans, Louisiana, and graduated in 1971 with an economics major. Durant was in the Reserve Officers' Training Corps and graduated as a second lieutenant in the U.S. Army Transportation Corps. He served 3 months of active duty at Fort Eustis, Virginia in 1971, then went into the Reserves and was honorably discharged as a captain. He received a J.D. from Notre Dame Law School in 1976. Durant was admitted to the Michigan bar in 1976.

== Education career and Cornerstone Schools ==
After leaving the military in 1971, Durant served as the assistant to the president of Hillsdale College and then as a vice president of the college in 1972–1973. Durant co-founded and started Imprimis, a monthly speech digest with a 2010 circulation over 2 million, described by Salon.com as "the most influential conservative publication you've never heard of". He also served as the first director of Hillsdale's Center for Constructive Alternatives and established the Washington-Hillsdale Intern Program (WHIP). While at Notre Dame Law School, Durant taught a Great Books undergraduate course at Notre Dame.

In 1991, Durant was one of the co-founders of the Cornerstone Schools (Michigan) with Adam Cardinal Maida. The Cornerstone Schools were founded as independent schools in the inner city of Detroit. Durant served as chairman of the board from 1991 to 2003, and CEO from 2003 to 2009. In 2009, he helped establish Cornerstone charter schools to increase public access to a Cornerstone education in Detroit.

In 1994, Durant was elected to the State Board of Education in Michigan, and served as president of the board. In 1995, the board passed a bold mission statement with a 7–1 vote, but which also drew criticism for using religious language, some drawn directly from the Michigan Constitution and Northwest Ordinance. Durant stepped down four years later, in 1999, to focus on education in Detroit through the Cornerstone Schools.

In 1995, Durant was named a Michiganian of the Year by the Detroit News for his work in education.

In 2004, Durant created, and with Arnold Palmer co-hosted The Turning Point Invitational golf tournament, which commemorated the 50th anniversary of Palmer's 1954 victory of the U.S. Amateur at Country Club of Detroit. 26 other past winners of the U.S. Amateurs attended. The event raised over $6 million in revenue, with proceeds benefiting the Cornerstone Schools and other charities, making it one of the most successful charity golf events ever. Palmer described the event as "the most incredible event I have ever been involved with in more than 60 years of golf, and I have been involved in a lot of them over the years."

Since 2005, the Detroit Tigers have sponsored Be A Tiger For Kids, a charity event that has raised over $2 million for the Cornerstone Schools.

Durant has been a member of various educational boards and organizations throughout Michigan. Former and current positions include:

- Member of the board of U of D Jesuit (2001–2010)
- Member of the Visiting Committee of the Michigan Center for Theoretical Physics at the University of Michigan
- Member of the board of Excellent Schools Detroit.

== Legal and business career ==
After attending law school at Notre Dame and working at Hillsdale College, Durant spent the first six years of his legal career defending low-income people who could not afford a lawyer in a variety of civil and criminal matters.

In 1983, Durant was appointed by then Secretary of Transportation Elizabeth Dole as the bankruptcy trustee for the Ann Arbor Railroad, a state-owned, state-subsidized railroad with approximately $100 million in debt and claims. He served as trustee from 1983 to 1988, turning the railroad into a profitable private-sector enterprise.

In 1984, Durant was nominated by President Ronald Reagan and confirmed by the U.S. Senate to serve on the board of the Legal Services Corporation. He served as chair from 1984 to 1988.

From 1997 to 2001, Durant was director of the Private Management Group at Munder Capital Management, an investment firm in Bloomfield Hills, Michigan.

Durant has been a member of the board of Michigan Chamber of Commerce.

== Political career ==
Durant represented Michigan on the 1984 Republican National Committee Platform Committee where he helped draft the party platform on which President Reagan ran for and won his landslide re-election.

From 1986 to 1988, Durant served as one of four national co-chairs of Jack Kemp's presidential campaign.

In 1990, Durant ran in the Republican primary for U.S. Senate, losing to former attorney general of Michigan, Bill Schuette.

At the request of Governor John Engler, Durant ran for the Michigan Supreme Court, and later the State Board of Education.

=== 2012 Senate campaign ===
Durant ran for the United States Senate in the 2012 Republican primary. General Motors adviser Bob Lutz served as the Republican U.S. Senate candidate's general finance chairman. Durant lost the Republican nomination to former representative Pete Hoekstra.

=== Recent Developments ===
Durant was officially accepted into the Association of Churchill Fellows for 2018 during the organization's weekend activity at the Westminster College campus. This honor society was founded in 1969. Cornerstone Schools closed the Leadership and Business Private High School after the 2017–2018 school year. Sixty-two students enrolled in the academic program at E. Nevada, Detroit (Michigan) transferred to the Health + Technology High School and other Cornerstone schools in that city. Cornerstone has been publicized nationwide for distinction in education as well as accelerated academics.
