= 2014 Michigan Attorney General election =

2014 Michigan Attorney General Election
- November 4, 2014
- Turnout: 3,077,164
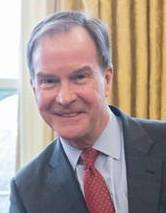

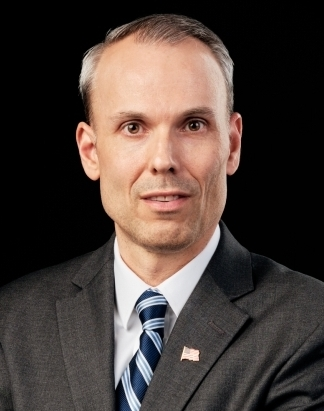
Nominee	Bill Schuette	Mark Totten
Party	Republican	Democratic
Popular vote	1,603,471	1,359,839
Percentage	52.11%	44.19%
- Schuette: 40–50% 50–60% 60–70% 70–80% Totten: 40–50% 50–60% 60–70% 70–80%
Attorney General before election
Bill Schuette
Republican
Elected Attorney General
Bill Schuette
Republican

The 2014 Michigan Attorney General election took place on November 4, 2014, to elect the Attorney General of Michigan. Incumbent Republican Attorney General Bill Schuette was re-elected to a second term in office with 52.11% of the vote.

== Republican convention ==
=== Candidates ===
==== Nominee ====
- Bill Schuette, incumbent Attorney General

== Democratic convention ==
=== Candidates ===
==== Nominee ====
- Mark Totten, law professor at Michigan State University and candidate for the State Senate in 2010

==== Withdrew ====
- Godfrey Dillard, attorney and candidate for Michigan's 15th congressional district in 1996 (running for Secretary of State)

== Minor parties ==
=== Libertarian Party ===
- Justin Altman, attorney

=== Green Party ===
- John Anthony La Pietra, attorney, nominee for Secretary of State in 2010 and nominee for Calhoun County Clerk and Register of Deeds in 2008 and 2012

=== Taxpayers Party ===
- Gerald Van Sickle, nominee for attorney general in 2002 and 2010

== General election ==
=== Polling ===
Poll source	Date(s) administered	Sample size	Margin of error	Bill Schuette (R)	Mark Totten (D)	Other	Undecided
Mitchell Research	November 2, 2014	1,224	± 2.8%	49%	41%	4%	6%
Public Policy Polling	November 1–2, 2014	914	± 3.2%	47%	37%	6%	10%
EPIC-MRA	October 26–28, 2014	600	± 4%	47%	35%	4%	14%
Glengariff Group	October 22–24, 2014	600	± 4%	37.8%	33.5%	6.2%	22.5%
Clarity Campaign Labs	October 19–20, 2014	1,032	± 3.05%	38%	38%	—	24%
EPIC-MRA	October 17–19, 2014	600	± 4%	43%	33%	4%	20%
Lake Research Partners	October 13–19, 2014	1,032	± 4%	38%	38%	—	24%
Clarity Campaign Labs	October 12–14, 2014	967	± 3.16%	39%	37%	—	24%
Clarity Campaign Labs	October 11–13, 2014	?	± ?	39%	37%	—	24%
Glengariff Group	October 2–4, 2014	600	± 4%	39.2%	32.1%	4.8%	23.8%
Mitchell Research	September 29, 2014	1,178	± 2.86%	43%	39%	18%	
EPIC-MRA	September 25–29, 2014	600	± 4%	38%	32%	11%	18%
Target-Insyght	September 22–24, 2014	616	± 4%	42%	41%	6%	11%
Denno Research	September 11–13, 2014	600	± 4%	40.5%	32.5%	—	27%
Suffolk	September 6–10, 2014	500	± 4.4%	36.4%	42.8%	3.6%	17.2%
Public Policy Polling	September 4–7, 2014	687	± 3.7%	36%	36%	10%	18%
Glengariff Group	September 3–5, 2014	600	± 4%	39.7%	37.7%	1.7%	21%
EPIC-MRA	August 22–25, 2014	600	± 4%	40%	34%	—	26%
Public Policy Polling	June 26–29, 2014	578	± 4.1%	34%	32%	—	35%
EPIC-MRA	May 17–20, 2014	600	± 4%	38%	33%	—	29%
Public Policy Polling	April 3–6, 2014	825	± 3.4%	36%	33%	—	31%
EPIC-MRA	February 5–11, 2014	600	± 4%	39%	31%	—	30%
Harper Polling	January 7–8, 2014	1,004	± 3.09%	42%	33%	—	24%
Public Policy Polling	December 5–8, 2013	1,034	± 3%	40%	38%	—	22%

=== Results ===
Michigan attorney general election, 2014
Party	Candidate	Votes	%	±%
Republican	Bill Schuette (incumbent)	1,603,471	52.11%	−0.48%
Democratic	Mark Totten	1,359,839	44.19%	+0.71%
Libertarian	Justin Altman	57,345	1.86%	−0.08%
U.S. Taxpayers'	Gerald Van Sickle	30,762	1.0%	−0.94%
Green	John La Pietra	25,747	0.84%	N/A
Majority		243,632	7.92%	−1.19%
Turnout		3,077,164		−1.88%
Republican hold		Swing		

=== By congressional district ===
Schuette won ten of 14 congressional districts, including one that elected a Democrat.

District	Schuette	Totten	Representative
1st	59%	37%	Dan Benishek
2nd	64%	32%	
2nd	64%	32%	Bill Huizenga
3rd	60%	35%	Justin Amash
4th	63%	33%	Dave Camp (113th Congress)
4th	63%	33%	John Moolenaar (114th Congress)
5th	46%	51%	Dan Kildee
6th	56%	39%	Fred Upton
7th	58%	38%	Tim Walberg
8th	58%	38%	Mike Rogers (113th Congress)
8th	58%	38%	Mike Bishop (114th Congress)
9th	49%	47%	Sander Levin
10th	62%	34%	Candice Miller
11th	59%	38%	Kerry Bentivolio (113th Congress)
11th	59%	38%	Dave Trott (114th Congress)
12th	39%	57%	John Dingell (113th Congress)
12th	39%	57%	Debbie Dingell (114th Congress)
13th	20%	77%	John Conyers
14th	25%	73%	Gary Peters (113th Congress)
14th	25%	73%	Brenda Lawrence (114th Congress)
