= Cornerstone Schools (Michigan) =

System of charter schools in Detroit, Michigan, United States

Cornerstone Schools is a system of charter schools in Detroit, Michigan, United States. It has four K-8 campuses and Cornerstone Health + Technology High School, all located in the city. They were first established in 1991.
