= Bill Schuette =

American politician (born 1953)

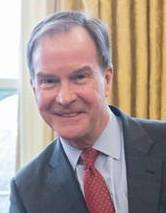
- Schuette in 2018

53rd Attorney General of Michigan
- In office January 1, 2011 – January 1, 2019
- Governor: Rick Snyder
- Preceded by: Mike Cox
- Succeeded by: Dana Nessel

Judge of the Michigan Fourth District Court of Appeals
- In office January 1, 2003 – January 1, 2009
- Preceded by: Donald Holbrook
- Succeeded by: Michael Kelly

Member of the Michigan Senate from the 35th district
- In office January 11, 1995 – January 8, 2003
- Preceded by: Joanne Emmons
- Succeeded by: Michelle McManus

Director of the Michigan Department of Agriculture
- In office January 11, 1991 – February 25, 1994
- Governor: John Engler
- Preceded by: Robert Mitchell
- Succeeded by: Gordon Guyer

Member of the U.S. House of Representatives from Michigan's 10th district
- In office January 3, 1985 – January 3, 1991
- Preceded by: Donald Albosta
- Succeeded by: Dave Camp

Personal details
- Born: William Duncan Schuette; October 13, 1953 (age 73) Midland, Michigan, U.S.
- Party: Republican
- Spouse: Cynthia Grebe
- Children: 2, including Bill
- Education: Georgetown University (BS); University of San Francisco (JD)

William Duncan Schuette (/ˈʃuːti/ SHOO-tee; born October 13, 1953) is an American lawyer and politician who served as the 53rd attorney general of Michigan from 2011 to 2019. A member of the Republican Party, he was the party's nominee for U.S. Senate in 1990 and governor in 2018.

Schuette was first elected attorney general in 2010. He was re-elected in 2014. Previously, he served three terms as a member of the U.S. House of Representatives from 1985 to 1991.

== Early life ==
Schuette was born in Midland, Michigan. He is the son of Esther Cathrin (née Little) and William H. Schuette, and step-son of Carl Gerstacker, former chairman of the board of The Dow Chemical Company. Schuette graduated from Herbert Henry Dow High School in 1972. He attended Georgetown University in Washington, D.C., and in 1976 graduated cum laude with a Bachelor of Science degree in the Foreign Service. He also studied at the University of Aberdeen as an exchange student from 1974 to 1975 and received a J.D. from the University of San Francisco School of Law in 1979. Schuette was admitted to the Michigan bar in 1981.

== Political career ==
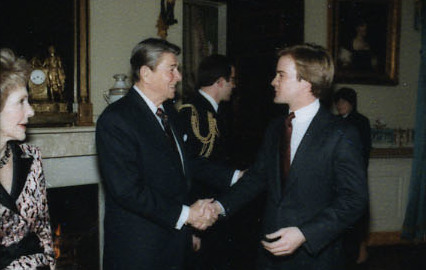
Schuette meeting with President Ronald Reagan in 1985

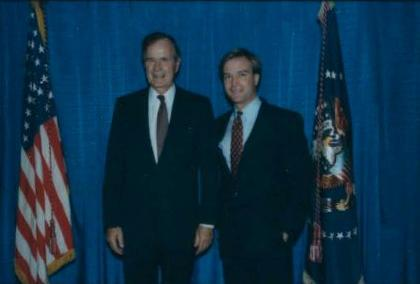
Schuette with President George H. W. Bush in 1990

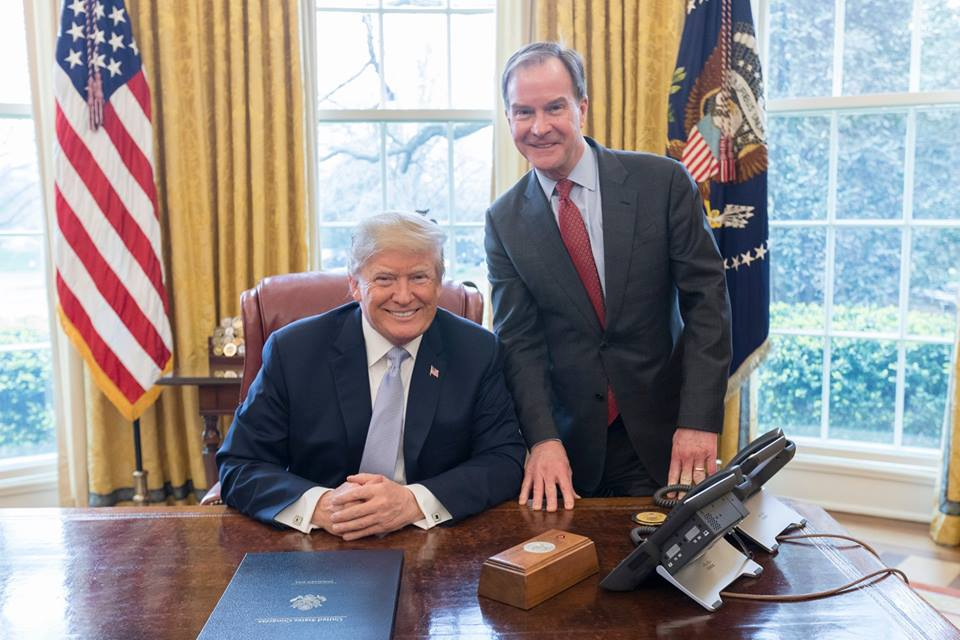
Schuette with President Donald Trump in 2018

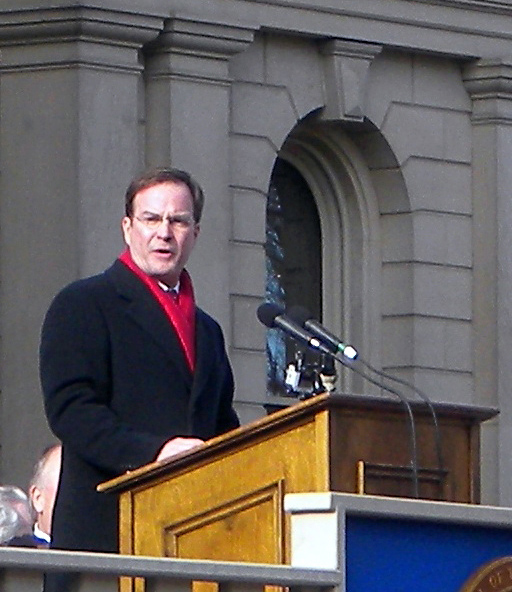
Schuette at his 2011 Inauguration

Schuette was a delegate to the Michigan Republican conventions in 1972, 1974, and 1982.

In November 1984, at the age of 31, Schuette narrowly defeated incumbent Democrat Donald J. Albosta for a seat in the United States House of Representatives from Michigan's 10th congressional district. Schuette was re-elected to the two succeeding Congresses, serving from January 3, 1985 until January 3, 1991. In 1990, he unsuccessfully challenged Democratic United States Senator Carl Levin for reelection. While in Congress, Schuette served on the House Budget Committee, the House Agriculture Committee and the House Select Committee on Aging.

In January 1991, Schuette was named by then-Governor John Engler as the director of the Michigan Department of Agriculture. The incumbent director, Robert Mitchell, resigned after Engler was elected governor. He was approved by the five member agriculture commission on January 11, 1991. While director, Schuette and his wife Cynthia created the Michigan Harvest Gathering, a food and fund drive to help feed hungry people throughout the state. Joining with the Food Bank Council of Michigan, the Michigan Harvest Gathering has raised more than $4 million and 6 million pounds of food over a 12-year period. He resigned from his post on February 25, 1994 to run for the Michigan State Senate. He was replaced by Gordon Guyer as director of agriculture.

In November 1994, he was elected to the Michigan Senate from the 35th district, where he served until 2003. In 2001, Schuette was selected by President George W. Bush to be his personal representative to Australian-American Friendship Week in Australia.

In November 2002, he was elected a judge on the Michigan Fourth District Court of Appeals. He succeeded Donald E. Holbrook Jr. He took office in January 2003. His term expired on January 1, 2009. He was replaced by Michael J. Kelly.

In 2008, Michigan voters considered a ballot initiative to establish a medical marijuana program for registered patients with qualifying conditions. Schuette served as a spokesperson for a group opposed to the proposed law. After leaving the judiciary, Schuette worked for Warner, Norcross & Judd, one of Michigan's largest law firms.

On November 2, 2010, Schuette won the election to become Michigan Attorney General.

In September 2011, petition language to recall Schuette was approved by Midland County authorities, allowing the circulating of recall petitions. Among the grievances cited are his attempts to undermine the medical marijuana law approved by voters in 2008.

In 2011, Schuette filed suit to close two Michigan abortion clinics on grounds of improper record disposal.

Before the Supreme Court's 2015, decision in Obergefell v. Hodges, Schuette fought against same-sex marriage.

On August 19, 2015, Schuette endorsed Jeb Bush for president.

In December 2016, Schuette filed suit to try to stop a presidential election recount effort in Michigan requested by Green Party candidate Jill Stein.

In January 2017, Schuette was admonished by US District Judge David M. Lawson for attempting to file an amicus brief taking an opposite position than Schuette originally took on the issue of requiring the State of Michigan to supply bottled water to Flint residents who lack tap filters. Judge Lawson said it injected a "troubling ethical issue into [the] lawsuit" and it suggested "superficial posturing" on behalf of Schuette.

Schuette chose not to challenge incumbent Dan Kildee for his congressional seat in the redrawn district which includes Schuette's home of Midland in the 2022 midterm election.

== 2018 gubernatorial campaign ==
Schuette was widely believed to be planning to run for governor of Michigan. In July 2016, before speaking on the opening day of the 2016 Republican National Convention Schuette changed the name of his fundraising committee from "Bill Schuette for Attorney General" to "Bill Schuette for Michigan." Despite being ineligible for a further term as attorney general due to term limits, Schuette had continued to raise funds since his November 2014 re-election.

In December 2016, Schuette said he had not made up his mind on running for governor but would make a decision sometime in 2017. This is backed up by reports of a falling-out between the attorney general and Governor Rick Snyder.

On September 12, 2017, Schuette announced his campaign for governor in Midland, Michigan. On August 7, 2018, Schuette won the Republican nomination for Michigan governor by defeating Lieutenant Governor Brian Calley and state Senator Patrick Colbeck. His candidacy was supported by President Donald Trump and Vice President Mike Pence. On November 6, 2018, he lost the general election to Democrat Gretchen Whitmer, a former Michigan senate leader, by a nine-point margin.

In an article for YAHOO in July 2026, Bill claimed to work in intelligence for the department of defense. There is no evidence for this and he appears to have fabricated details about his life to support an attack on Michigan Democrats.

== Personal life ==
Schuette lives in Midland, Michigan with his wife Cynthia. They have two children. One of Schuette's children, Bill G. Schuette was elected to the Michigan House of Representatives in 2022.

== Controversies ==
On July 3, 2018, Ingham County prosecutor Carol Siemon requested a grand jury investigation (which was never conducted) to probe the sale of multimillion-dollar property inherited by Schuette in the Virgin Islands, to determine if any laws were violated. Schuette's spokesperson stated that the accusation was a "baseless attack on an attorney general with a strong ethical record".

Schuette was working to strike down a ballot initiative to eliminate partisan gerrymandering, which has gained enough signatures to be on the Michigan ballot in the November 2018 election. The issue went on to the state supreme court, where "Five of the seven justices were nominated or appointed by Republicans, and two of those have received financial backing from the Michigan Chamber of Commerce, which also happens to be one of the main funders of the opposition campaign. Both justices have refused to recuse themselves from the case." The court upheld the inclusion of the initiative on the ballot, which was approved by voters.

== Electoral history ==
Michigan's 10th Congressional District election, 1984
Party	Candidate	Votes	%	±%
Republican	Bill Schuette	104,950	50.1	+11.2
Democratic	Don Albosta (incumbent)	103,636	49.4	−10.7
Libertarian	Bill Leef	1,054	0.5	+0.5
Majority		1,314	0.7	−20.5
Turnout		209,645		+23.5
Republican gain from Democratic				

Michigan's 10th Congressional District election, 1986
Party	Candidate	Votes	%	±%
Republican	Bill Schuette (incumbent)	78,475	51.1	+1.0
Democratic	Don Albosta	74,941	48.8	−0.6
Write-In	Write-in	8	0.005	N/A
Majority		3,534	2.3	+1.7
Turnout		153,424		−26.8
Republican hold				

Michigan's 10th Congressional District election, 1988
Party	Candidate	Votes	%	±%
Republican	Bill Schuette (incumbent)	152,646	72.7	+21.6
Democratic	Mathias G. Forbes	74,941	26.4	−22.4
Libertarian	Gary R. Bradley	1,812	0.9	+0.9
Other	Other	7	0.003	N/A
Majority		77,705	46.3	+44.1
Turnout		209,863		+36.8
Republican hold				

United States Senate election in Michigan, 1990
Party	Candidate	Votes	%	±%
Democratic	Carl Levin (incumbent)	1,471,753	57.4	+5.6
Republican	Bill Schuette	1,055,695	41.2	−6.0
Workers World	Susan Farquhar	32,796	1.3	+1.24
Majority		416,058	16.2	+11.6
Turnout		2,560,494		+36.8
Democratic hold				

Michigan Senate 35th District election, 1998
Party	Candidate	Votes	%	±%
Republican	Bill Schuette (incumbent)	61,510	70.4	N/A
Democratic	Brian Baldwin	25,900	29.6	N/A
Majority		35,610	40.8	N/A
Republican hold				

Michigan attorney general election, 2010
Party	Candidate	Votes	%	±%
Republican	Bill Schuette	1,649,223	52.59%	−1.29%
Democratic	David Leyton	1,363,486	43.48%	−0.03%
Libertarian	Daniel Grow	62,737	2.00%	+0.33%
U.S. Taxpayers'	Gerald Van Sickle	60,778	1.94%	+0.95%
Majority		285,737	9.11%	−1.21%
Turnout		3,136,224		−0.15%
Republican hold				

Michigan attorney general election, 2014
Party	Candidate	Votes	%	±%
Republican	Bill Schuette (incumbent)	1,603,471	52.11%	−0.48%
Democratic	Mark Totten	1,359,839	44.19%	+0.71%
Libertarian	Justin Altman	57,345	1.86%	−0.08%
U.S. Taxpayers'	Gerald Van Sickle	30,762	1.0%	−0.94%
Green	John La Pietra	25,747	0.84%	N/A
Majority		243,632	7.92%	−1.19%
Turnout		3,077,164		−1.88%
Republican hold				

Michigan gubernatorial election, 2018
Party	Candidate	Votes	%	±%
Democratic	Gretchen Whitmer Garlin Gilchrist	2,256,791	53.34%	+6.48%
Republican	Bill Schuette Lisa Posthumus Lyons	1,853,650	43.81%	−7.11%
Libertarian	Bill Gelineau Angelique Chaiser Thomas	56,752	1.34%	+0.21%
Constitution	Todd Schleiger Earl P. Lackie	24,701	0.58%	−0.03%
Green	Jennifer V. Kurland Charin H. Davenport	28,857	0.68%	+0.21%
Natural Law	Keith Butkovitch Raymond Warner	10,258	0.24%	−
Majority		403,141	9.53%	+5.47%
Turnout		4,231,009		34.04%
Democratic gain from Republican		Swing		

Party political offices
Preceded by Jack Lousma	Republican nominee for U.S. Senator from Michigan (Class 2); 1990	Succeeded by Ronna Romney
Preceded by Mike Cox	Republican nominee for Attorney General of Michigan; 2010, 2014	Succeeded by Tom Leonard
Preceded by Rick Snyder	Republican nominee for Governor of Michigan; 2018	Succeeded by Tudor Dixon
U.S. House of Representatives
Preceded by Donald Albosta	Member of the U.S. House of Representatives from Michigan's 10th congressional district 1985–1991	Succeeded by Dave Camp
Legal offices
Preceded by Mike Cox	Attorney General of Michigan; 2011–2019	Succeeded by Dana Nessel
U.S. order of precedence (ceremonial)
Preceded by Mark Siljander as Former U.S. Representative	Order of precedence of the United States as Former U.S. Representative	Succeeded by Pete Peterson as Former U.S. Representative
