= 2022 Michigan Attorney General election =

- November 8, 2022
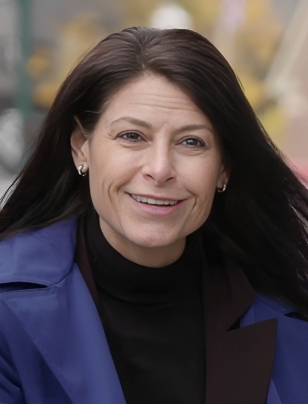

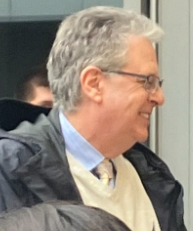
Nominee	Dana Nessel	Matthew DePerno
Party	Democratic	Republican
Popular vote	2,329,195	1,952,408
Percentage	53.16%	44.56%
- Nessel: 40–50% 50–60% 60–70% 70–80% 80–90% >90% DePerno: 40–50% 50–60% 60–70% 70–80% 80–90% Tie
Attorney General before election
Dana Nessel
Democratic
Elected Attorney General
Dana Nessel
Democratic

The 2022 Michigan attorney general election was held on November 8, 2022, to elect the attorney general of the state of Michigan. Incumbent Democratic Attorney General Dana Nessel ran for re-election to a second term. She was first elected in 2018 with 49.0% of the vote.

Michigan does not hold partisan primaries for statewide offices other than governor. Instead, the state parties hold conventions in August to nominate candidates for the general election. Party nomination conventions were held on April 9 for the Michigan Democratic Party and April 23 for the Michigan Republican Party.

In August 2022, Reuters reported that presumptive Republican nominee Matthew DePerno "led a team that gained unauthorized access to voting equipment while hunting for evidence to support former President Donald Trump’s false election-fraud claims" following the 2020 election. Gaining unauthorized access to voting machines is a felony in Michigan. Current Michigan Attorney General Nessel requested the appointment of an independent specialist prosecutor to investigate DePerno and his team. DePerno and former state representative Daire Rendon were indicted by a grand jury on August 1, 2023. In contrast, during his campaign, DePerno criticized Nessel, as well as Governor Gretchen Whitmer, for their policies during the 2020 COVID-19 pandemic, and accused Nessel of abusing her powers to silence her political rivals and of attacking the First Amendment, arguing her aforementioned appointing of an independent special prosecutor to investigate DePerno's unauthorized election investigation was one of these attacks.

This election marked the first time since 1998 that Democrats had won consecutively, and the first since 1994 that an incumbent Democrat had won re-election. It was also the best performance by a Democrat since 1998, and the worst performance by a Republican since 2002.

== Democratic convention ==
=== Candidates ===
==== Nominee ====
- Dana Nessel, incumbent attorney general

=== Endorsements ===
Dana Nessel

Organizations

- Democracy for America
- Giffords
- Michigan Democratic Party
- NARAL Pro-Choice America

Labor unions

- American Federation of Teachers

== Republican convention ==
=== Candidates ===
==== Nominee ====
- Matthew DePerno, private attorney

==== Eliminated at convention ====
- Ryan Berman, state representative from the 39th district
- Tom Leonard, former speaker of the Michigan House of Representatives and nominee in 2018

=== Endorsements ===
Matthew DePerno

U.S. executive branch officials

- Donald Trump, 45th president of the United States (2017–2021)

Organizations

- Michigan Republican Party
Tom Leonard

Organizations

- Central Michigan College Republicans
- Ferris State College Republicans
- Michigan Federation of College Republicans
- Right to Life of Michigan

== General election ==
=== Predictions ===
Source	Ranking	As of
Sabato's Crystal Ball	Leans D	November 3, 2022
Elections Daily	Leans D	November 1, 2022

=== Post-convention endorsements ===
Dana Nessel (D)

U.S. executive branch officials

- Pete Buttigieg, 19th United States secretary of transportation (2021–present) and mayor of South Bend (2012–2020)
- Barack Obama, 44th president of the United States (2009–2017) and U.S. Senator from Illinois (2005–2008)

Organizations

- Human Rights Campaign
- National Wildlife Federation

Newspapers

- Detroit Free Press
- The Michigan Daily

=== Polling ===
Graphical summary

Poll source	Date(s) administered	Sample size (Note: Key: A – all adults RV – registered voters LV – likely voters V – unclear)	Margin of error	Dana Nessel (D)	Matthew DePerno (R)	Other	Undecided
Cygnal (R)	November 1–4, 2022	1,603 (LV)	± 2.5%	48%	44%	3% (Note: "Third party candidate" with 3%)	6%
Mitchell Research	November 3, 2022	658 (LV)	± 3.8%	47%	44%	1% (Note: "Another candidate" with 1%)	8%
Cygnal (R)	October 31 – November 2, 2022	1,754 (LV)	± 2.3%	47%	43%	3% (Note: "Third party candidate" with 3%)	7%
EPIC-MRA	October 28 – November 1, 2022	600 (LV)	± 4.0%	48%	42%	3% (Note: McHugh (L) with 2%; Van Sickle (UTP) with 1%)	7%
Cygnal (R)	October 27–31, 2022	1,584 (LV)	± 2.5%	47%	42%	3% (Note: "Third party candidate" with 3%)	8%
Cygnal (R)	October 25–29, 2022	1,543 (LV)	± 2.5%	47%	41%	4% (Note: "Third party candidate" with 4%)	8%
The Glengariff Group, Inc.	October 26–28, 2022	600 (LV)	± 4.0%	44%	43%	5%	8%
Cygnal (R)	October 23–27, 2022	1,822 (LV)	± 2.3%	46%	42%	4% (Note: "Third party candidate" with 4%)	8%
Cygnal (R)	October 21–25, 2022	1,378 (LV)	± 2.6%	46%	43%	4% (Note: "Third party candidate" with 4%)	7%
Cygnal (R)	October 19–23, 2022	1,459 (LV)	± 2.6%	45%	43%	3% (Note: "Third party candidate" with 3%)	8%
Cygnal (R)	October 17–21, 2022	1,904 (LV)	± 2.3%	45%	42%	4% (Note: "Third party candidate" with 4%)	9%
Mitchell Research	October 19, 2022	541 (LV)	± 4.2%	46%	43%	3% (Note: "Another candidate" with 3%)	8%
Cygnal (R)	October 15–19, 2022	1,793 (LV)	± 2.3%	45%	43%	4% (Note: "Third party candidate" with 4%)	9%
Cygnal (R) (Note: This poll was sponsored by the Michigan Association of Broadcasters.)	October 12–14, 2022	640 (LV)	± 3.9%	45%	43%	3% (Note: "Third party candidate" with 3%)	8%
EPIC-MRA	October 6–12, 2022	600 (LV)	± 4.0%	43%	39%	4% (Note: McHugh (L) with 2%; Van Sickle (UTP) with 1%)	14%
The Glengariff Group, Inc.	September 26–29, 2022	600 (LV)	± 4.0%	43%	30%	7% (Note: McHuge with 4%; "Refused to answer" and Sickle with 2%; Hogan)	18%
The Trafalgar Group (R)	September 24–28, 2022	1,075 (LV)	± 2.9%	48%	45%	3% (Note: "Other" with 3%)	4%
EPIC-MRA (Note: Poll conducted for WJRT-TV and the Detroit Free Press.)	September 15–19, 2022	600 (LV)	± 4.0%	48%	39%	–	13%
EPIC-MRA (Note: Poll conducted for MIRS, Governmental Consultant Services Inc., and the Life Insurance Association of Michigan.)	September 7–13, 2022	800 (LV)	± 3.5%	48%	40%	7% (Note: "Third party candidate" with 7%)	5%
The Trafalgar Group (R)	August 22–25, 2022	1080 (LV)	± 2.9%	49%	47%	–	4%
EPIC-MRA	August 18–23, 2022	600 (LV)	± 4.0%	43%	39%	–	18%
The Glengariff Group, Inc.	July 5–8, 2022	600 (LV)	± 4.0%	44%	38%	–	18%
Target Insyght	May 26–27, 2022	600 (RV)	± 4.0%	54%	23%	–	23%
EPIC-MRA	May 11–17, 2022	600 (LV)	± 4.0%	43%	41%	–	16%
ARW Strategies (R) (Note: Poll sponsored by DePerno's campaign)	April 18–20, 2022	600 (LV)	± 4.0%	42%	41%	–	17%
The Glengariff Group, Inc.	January 3–7, 2022	600 (LV)	± 4.0%	44%	34%	–	22%

Hypothetical polling

Dana Nessel vs. Tom Leonard

Poll source	Date(s) administered	Sample size	Margin of error	Dana Nessel (D)	Tom Leonard (R)	Undecided
The Glengariff Group, Inc.	January 3–7, 2022	600 (LV)	± 4.0%	42%	36%	23%

=== Fundraising ===
Campaign finance reports as of October 23, 2022
Candidate (party)	Total receipts	Total disbursements	Cash on hand
Matthew DePerno (R)	$1,128,796.58	$823,888.63	$304,907.95
Dana Nessel (D)	$5,437,349.35	$5,192,193.84	$166,649.18
Source: Michigan Department of State

=== Results ===
2022 Michigan attorney general election
Party	Candidate	Votes	%	±%
Democratic	Dana Nessel (incumbent)	2,329,195	53.16%	+4.12%
Republican	Matthew DePerno	1,952,408	44.56%	−1.70%
Libertarian	Joseph W. McHugh Jr.	67,846	1.55%	−0.55%
Constitution	Gerald T. Van Sickle	32,431	0.74%	−0.18%
Total votes		4,381,880	100.00%	
Democratic hold				

==== By county ====
County	Dana Nessel; Democratic		Matthew DePerno; Republican		Other votes	
County	%	#	%	#	%	#
Alcona	32.4%	1,918	65.5%	3,875	2.1%	123
Alger	44.6%	1,897	53.5%	2,277	1.9%	79
Allegan	39.3%	22,170	58.1%	32,770	2.5%	1,432
Alpena	39.4%	5,410	58.3%	8,006	2.3%	321
Antrim	41.2%	5,689	56.7%	7,840	2.1%	294
Arenac	36.2%	2,567	61.0%	4,323	2.8%	196
Baraga	36.5%	1,241	61.4%	2,086	2.1%	72
Barry	37.2%	11,260	59.9%	18,117	2.9%	942
Bay	49.2%	23,807	48.1%	23,279	2.7%	1,284
Benzie	49.02%	5,165	48.99%	5,162	2.0%	210
Berrien	44.0%	27,707	53.5%	33,726	2.5%	1,551
Branch	33.5%	5,325	63.8%	10,148	2.7%	423
Calhoun	46.9%	23,798	50.4%	25,571	2.8%	1,417
Cass	33.8%	6,783	63.9%	12,818	2.3%	463
Charlevoix	44.1%	6,389	53.6%	7,760	2.3%	339
Cheboygan	38.6%	5,073	59.1%	7,778	2.3%	304
Chippewa	41.7%	5,973	55.6%	7,963	2.7%	380
Clare	36.5%	4,753	60.6%	7,900	2.9%	378
Clinton	48.3%	19,477	49.5%	19,942	2.2%	876
Crawford	38.4%	2,468	58.5%	3,760	3.1%	198
Delta	38.6%	6,569	59.3%	10,091	2.1%	364
Dickinson	33.8%	4,000	64.1%	7,580	2.1%	243
Eaton	52.1%	27,398	45.5%	23,944	2.3%	1,234
Emmet	46.5%	8,822	51.3%	9,731	2.2%	421
Genesee	57.1%	96,490	40.5%	68,401	2.4%	3,010
Gladwin	35.4%	4,192	62.0%	7,344	2.7%	316
Gogebic	43.9%	2,781	54.1%	3,425	2.0%	129
Grand Traverse	51.0%	26,316	46.7%	24,105	2.2%	1,141
Gratiot	39.4%	5,938	57.7%	8,704	2.9%	445
Hillsdale	28.2%	5,177	69.0%	12,657	2.8%	519
Houghton	43.9%	6,679	53.9%	8,190	2.2%	329
Huron	34.7%	5,133	62.8%	9,284	2.4%	356
Ingham	67.5%	79,124	30.2%	35,455	2.3%	2,642
Ionia	39.0%	10,387	57.9%	15,417	3.1%	839
Iosco	39.6%	4,950	58.1%	7,263	2.3%	282
Iron	37.9%	2,104	60.0%	3,334	2.1%	117
Isabella	50.9%	11,959	46.5%	10,930	2.6%	616
Jackson	42.9%	27,305	54.5%	34,707	2.6%	1,666
Kalamazoo	60.5%	69,563	37.0%	42,570	2.4%	2,766
Kalkaska	32.6%	2,845	64.2%	5,607	3.2%	283
Kent	53.6%	158,286	42.9%	129,630	2.4%	6,169
Keweenaw	45.6%	624	52.2%	713	2.2%	30
Lake	38.1%	1,979	58.9%	3,057	3.0%	156
Lapeer	35.1%	15,127	62.3%	26,807	2.6%	1,109
Leelanau	54.1%	8,267	44.0%	6,725	1.8%	277
Lenawee	39.9%	16,740	57.3%	24,059	2.8%	1,177
Livingston	41.6%	44,275	56.1%	59,722	2.3%	2,455
Luce	31.2%	723	66.6%	1,542	2.2%	52
Mackinac	40.7%	2,397	57.2%	3,369	2.1%	121
Macomb	50.4%	189,717	47.4%	178,240	2.2%	8,205
Manistee	45.5%	5,683	51.6%	6,436	2.9%	359
Marquette	58.5%	18,029	39.5%	12,179	2.0%	630
Mason	41.7%	6,108	55.6%	8,133	2.7%	396
Mecosta	37.5%	6,487	59.5%	10,297	3.0%	526
Menominee	33.6%	3,189	64.0%	6,070	2.4%	229
Midland	45.5%	18,434	51.9%	21,006	2.6%	1,063
Missaukee	25.2%	1,857	72.1%	5,324	2.7%	199
Monroe	40.9%	27,471	56.7%	38,104	2.5%	1,773
Montcalm	35.7%	9,230	61.2%	15,841	3.1%	802
Montmorency	30.8%	1,560	66.6%	3,376	2.6%	134
Muskegon	52.8%	38,113	44.4%	32,017	2.8%	2,023
Newaygo	32.4%	7,297	64.2%	14,442	3.4%	759
Oakland	59.6%	368,737	38.5%	238,077	1.9%	11,610
Oceana	38.8%	4,618	57.6%	6,853	3.7%	436
Ogemaw	34.6%	3,353	63.1%	6,112	2.3%	224
Ontonagon	38.2%	1,225	59.2%	1,898	2.6%	82
Osceola	29.2%	2,997	67.6%	6,925	3.2%	327
Oscoda	31.4%	1,240	66.0%	2,604	2.5%	100
Otsego	36.6%	4,512	60.7%	7,482	2.7%	339
Ottawa	39.6%	57,068	58.1%	83,787	2.3%	3,280
Presque Isle	40.0%	2,884	57.9%	4,176	2.2%	157
Roscommon	38.4%	4,880	59.0%	7,506	2.7%	338
Saginaw	51.8%	41,468	45.9%	36,784	2.3%	1,851
Sanilac	31.0%	5,733	66.2%	12,217	2.8%	516
Schoolcraft	37.3%	1,426	60.0%	2,292	2.7%	102
Shiawassee	44.0%	14,032	53.3%	16,989	2.8%	879
St. Clair	39.0%	28,445	58.0%	42,219	3.0%	2,179
St. Joseph	36.0%	7,768	60.9%	13,117	3.1%	664
Tuscola	33.7%	7,981	63.6%	15,071	2.7%	650
Van Buren	46.9%	14,739	50.4%	15,850	2.7%	860
Washtenaw	74.4%	132,494	23.9%	42,545	1.7%	2,954
Wayne	69.5%	440,029	28.4%	179,822	2.0%	12,844
Wexford	36.0%	5,371	61.4%	9,153	2.6%	394
Totals	53.16%	2,329,195	44.56%	1,952,408	2.29%	100,277

Counties that flipped from Democratic to Republican

- Gogebic (largest city: Ironwood)

Counties that flipped from Republican to Democratic

- Benzie (largest city: Frankfort)
- Grand Traverse (largest city: Traverse City)
- Bay (largest city: Bay City)
- Eaton (largest city: Charlotte)
- Isabella (largest city: Mount Pleasant)
- Macomb (largest city: Warren)
- Saginaw (largest city: Saginaw)
- Leelanau (largest municipality: Greilickville)
- Kent (largest municipality: Grand Rapids)

==== By congressional district ====
Nessel won eight of 13 congressional districts, including one that elected a Republican.

District	Nessel	DePerno	Representative
1st	43%	55%	Jack Bergman
2nd	39%	58%	John Moolenaar
3rd	55%	43%	Peter Meijer (117th Congress)
3rd	55%	43%	Hillary Scholten (118th Congress)
4th	48%	49%	Bill Huizenga
5th	39%	58%	Tim Walberg
6th	65%	33%	Debbie Dingell
7th	53%	45%	Elissa Slotkin
8th	54%	44%	Dan Kildee
9th	39%	58%	Lisa McClain
10th	54%	44%	John James
11th	63%	35%	Haley Stevens
12th	74%	24%	Rashida Tlaib
13th	75%	22%	Shri Thanedar

== Notes ==
Partisan clients
