= Mib2 =

Mib2 or variant, may refer to:

- Men in Black II (MIIB/MiB2) 2002 American film
- Men in Black 2: The Series (video game) 2002 GBC game
- Men in Black II: Alien Escape (video game) 2002 PS2/GCN game
- MIB2 (gene), a gene encoding a ligase enzyme

== See also ==
- MIB (disambiguation)
- MIBB (Michigan Israel Business Bridge)
