= Jennifer Granholm =

American politician (born 1959)

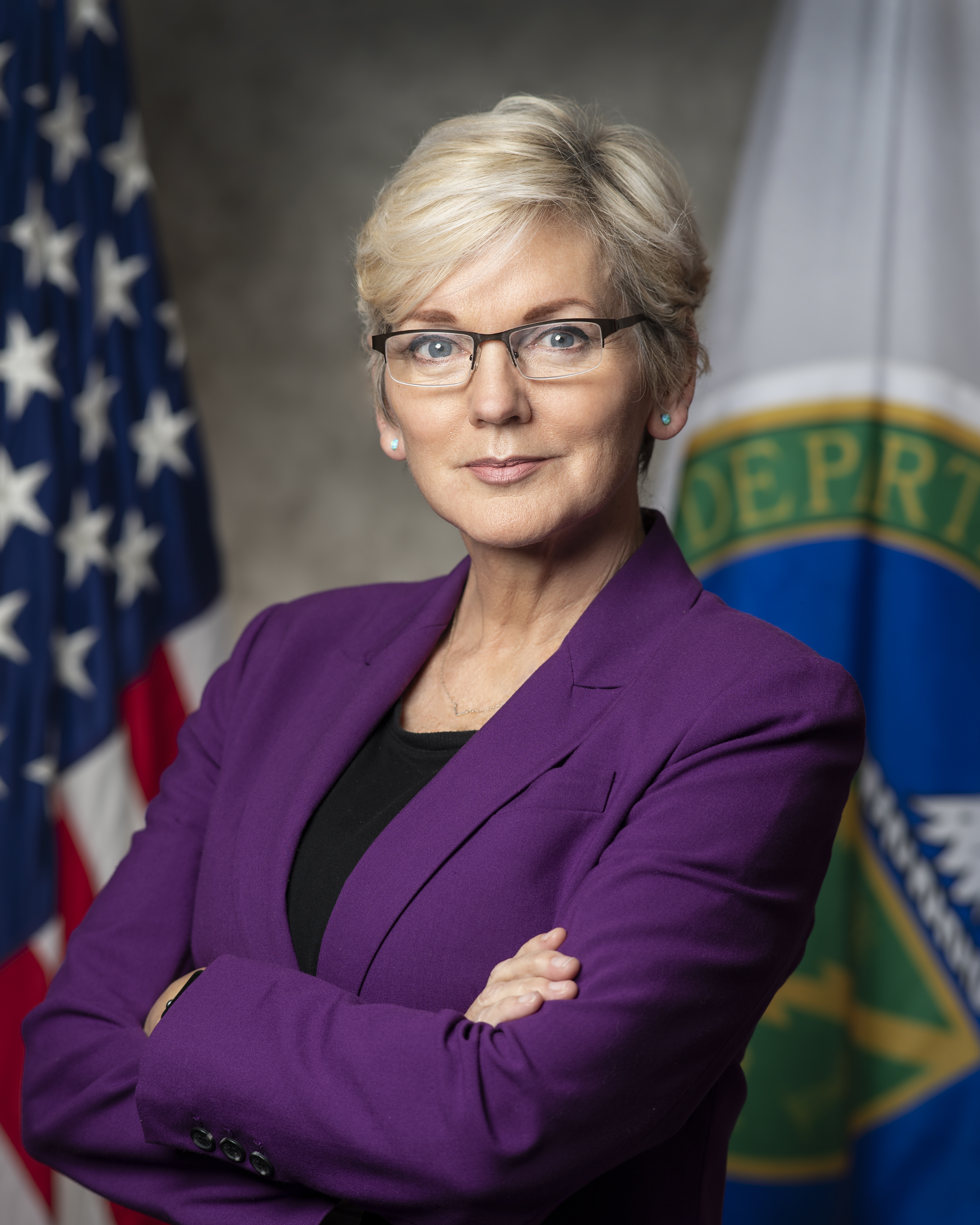
- Official portrait, 2021

16th United States Secretary of Energy
- In office February 25, 2021 – January 20, 2025
- President: Joe Biden
- Deputy: David Turk
- Preceded by: Dan Brouillette
- Succeeded by: Chris Wright

47th Governor of Michigan
- In office January 1, 2003 – January 1, 2011
- Lieutenant: John D. Cherry
- Preceded by: John Engler
- Succeeded by: Rick Snyder

51st Attorney General of Michigan
- In office January 1, 1999 – January 1, 2003
- Governor: John Engler
- Preceded by: Frank J. Kelley
- Succeeded by: Mike Cox

Personal details
- Born: February 5, 1959 (age 67) Vancouver, British Columbia, Canada
- Party: Democratic
- Spouse: Daniel Mulhern (m. 1986)
- Children: 3
- Education: University of California, Berkeley (BA); Harvard University (JD)
- Granholm's voice Granholm on U.S. nuclear infrastructure stability. Recorded June 24, 2021

Jennifer Mulhern Granholm (born February 5, 1959) is a Canadian-born American politician who was the 16th United States secretary of energy from 2021 to 2025. A member of the Democratic Party, she previously served as the 47th governor of Michigan from 2003 to 2011 and as the 51st attorney general of Michigan from 1999 to 2003, the first woman to hold either office.

Born in Vancouver, British Columbia, Canada, Granholm moved to California at age four. She obtained a Bachelor of Arts degree from the University of California, Berkeley, in 1984 and a Juris Doctor degree from Harvard Law School in 1987. She then clerked for Judge Damon Keith of the United States Court of Appeals for the Sixth Circuit, became an assistant U.S. attorney for the Eastern District of Michigan in 1991, and was appointed to the Wayne County Corporation Counsel in 1995.

In 1998, Granholm ran for attorney general of Michigan, defeating Republican nominee John Smietanka. She ran for governor of Michigan in 2002 and was elected the state's first female governor. She was re-elected in 2006.

Granholm was a member of the presidential transition team for Barack Obama before he assumed office in 2009. After leaving public office, Granholm took a position at the UC Berkeley and, with her husband Daniel Mulhern, wrote A Governor's Story: The Fight for Jobs and America's Future, released in 2011. She became host of The War Room with Jennifer Granholm. In 2017, she was hired as a CNN political contributor.

After President-elect Joe Biden announced his intention to nominate Granholm to head the United States Department of Energy in 2020, she was confirmed by the U.S. Senate in 2021. After serving a full term as secretary, she joined DGA Group.

== Early life and education ==
Granholm was born February 5, 1959, in Vancouver, British Columbia, to Shirley Alfreda (née Dowden) and Victor Ivar Granholm, both bank tellers. Granholm's maternal grandparents came from Ireland and Newfoundland, respectively. Her paternal grandfather was Hugo "Anders" Granholm, who immigrated to Penny, British Columbia, Canada, in the late 1920s from Robertsfors, Sweden, where his father was the mayor. The former Minister for Enterprise and Energy and former deputy prime minister of Sweden, Maud Olofsson, lives in Robertsfors, and when the two met in Sweden, the media revealed that Olofsson's husband is a relative of Granholm. Her paternal grandmother was Judith Olivia Henriette (Solstad) Granholm, an emigrant from Gjerstad in Southern Norway. She came with the ship SS Bergensfjord from Oslo to Halifax, and from there she took the railway to Penny, British Columbia, where her uncles and several others had established a small logging village.

Granholm's family immigrated to California when she was four years old. She grew up in Anaheim, San Jose, and San Carlos. Granholm attended Ida Price Junior High and Del Mar High School before graduating from San Carlos High School in 1977 and won the Miss San Carlos beauty pageant. As a young adult, she attempted to launch a Hollywood acting career but abandoned her efforts at age 21. In 1978, she appeared on The Dating Game, and held jobs as a tour guide at Universal Studios and in customer service at the Los Angeles Times and was the first female tour guide at Marine World/Africa USA in Redwood City, piloting boats with 25 tourists aboard.

In 1980, at age 21, she became a naturalized U.S. citizen, and worked for John B. Anderson's campaign for president of the United States as an Independent in the 1980 election. She then enrolled at the University of California, Berkeley, the first person in her family to attend college. She was elected to Phi Beta Kappa and graduated in 1984 with a B.A. in political science and French. During a year in France, she helped to smuggle clothes and medical supplies to Jewish people in the Soviet Union and became involved in the anti-apartheid movement. She then earned a Juris Doctor degree at Harvard University, also with honors, in 1987. At Harvard Law School, Granholm served as editor-in-chief of the Harvard Civil Rights-Civil Liberties Law Review.

== Early career ==
After graduating from Harvard Law School, Granholm clerked for Judge Damon Keith, a senior judge on the U.S. Court of Appeals for the Sixth Circuit, from 1987 to 1988. She also worked for the Michael Dukakis 1988 presidential campaign. After working as an attorney in the Wayne County executive office from 1989 to 1991, Granholm became an assistant U.S. attorney for the Eastern District of Michigan in 1991. She helped to prosecute drug dealers, gang members and child pornographers, sued the state and fought against credit card fraud. Of the 154 people Granholm tried, 151 were convicted. In 1995, she was appointed as Corporation Counsel for Wayne County, the youngest person to hold the position. Granholm defended the county against lawsuits, sued the state over road taxes, and fought to uphold environmental laws.

== Michigan Attorney General (1999–2003) ==
=== 1998 election ===
After thirty-seven years in office, Democratic Attorney General Frank J. Kelley chose not to run for a 10th term in 1998 and Granholm entered the race to succeed him. Unopposed for the Democratic nomination, she faced Republican John Smietanka, the 1994 nominee and former U.S. attorney for the Western District of Michigan, in the general election. The campaign began as a relatively friendly one, with both agreeing that they wanted to expand the Internet Crimes Unit, start neighborhood-based crime-fighting programmes and continue working as a consumer advocate, as Kelley had done.

However, the race turned bitter in mid-September, when Smietanka ran television ads that called Granholm an "inexperienced" and "dangerous" liberal. He also tried to link Granholm to Democratic gubernatorial nominee Geoffrey Fieger's crime plan, which called for greater emphasis on rehabilitation for non-violent criminals and shortening their prison terms. Granholm, who had disavowed Fieger's crime plan the day it was released, said the claim was "a lie, just a lie" and that as attorney general, "you are the person who is to protect the consumer from deceitful ads." Asked what separated her from Smietanka, Granholm replied, "Besides honesty?" Kelley also came to Granholm's defense, starring in an advertisement where he called Smietanka's ads "garbage" and a "con" and accused him of running a "dishonest campaign". For his part, Smietanka was angered by Democratic advertisements that referred to late child support payments he had made and claimed that he had lied about how much of his own money he donated to his campaign.

After a close race, with polls showing the two candidates with virtually identical votes, Granholm defeated Smietanka by 1,557,310 votes (52.09%) to 1,432,604 (47.91%). After Granholm was elected governor in 2002, arguments arose between Smietanka and then-Republican Governor John Engler about who was most responsible for Granholm's meteoric rise in Michigan politics. Smietanka blamed Engler for trying to force him out of the 1998 race in favor of G. Scott Romney, for dredging up the issue of his missed child support payments and for not supporting him more fully after he defeated Romney at the Republican convention. Engler countered that Smietanka was a weak candidate who should have stepped aside for Romney, who would have beaten the inexperienced Granholm; she would then not have had a launch pad for her gubernatorial campaign in 2002.

=== Tenure ===
Granholm was sworn into office on January 1, 1999, becoming the first female attorney general of Michigan. She served a single term, from 1999 to 2003. In office, she continued Kelley's work on protecting citizens and consumers' rights and established Michigan's first High Tech Crime Unit, appointing Terrence Berg as its first chief.

In April 1999, Granholm announced a lawsuit against RVP Development, builders of the Arcadia Bluffs Golf Course, alleging that poor construction of the course had led to illegal discharges of sediment into Lake Michigan from erosion following heavy storms in 1998, which had "turned a ravine into a ravaged gorge". Development company President Richard Postma refused to pay the $425,000 of state fines, saying he had made moves to stop the erosion and accused Granholm of trying to make him "a poster child for her campaign of the future". Granholm responded that his "perception of the political landscape in Michigan is as poor as his ability to construct a golf landscape". After years of negotiations and legal wrangling, the lawsuit was settled in August 2003, with RVP Development agreeing to pay a $125,000 fine.

During her tenure as Attorney General, Granholm became a harsh critic of the annual tradition at The University of Michigan called the Naked Mile. Through her efforts, the event was essentially cancelled by April 2000 never to emerge again. In July 2000, Granholm's office settled with J.C. Penney after the retailer made numerous pricing and scanning errors in stores in Michigan. The issue came to the attention of the attorney general's office after a "repeat and progressively worse error rate" that saw 33% of items sold in December 1999 being sold for more at the register than they were listed for on the shelves. J.C. Penney paid a fine and agreed to designate "pricing associates" to monitor for errors in pricing.

After the September 11 attacks in 2001, Granholm directed state agencies to work with lawmakers in keeping the fight against terrorism within the powers of the state. She also imposed a regulation on gasoline dealers to keep them from raising prices dramatically, something which occurred sporadically across Michigan immediately following the attacks. In February 2002, Granholm announced that her office was joining with the AARP Michigan State Office to help consumers fight calls from telemarketers.

== Governor of Michigan (2003–2011) ==
=== 2002 election ===
In the 2002 election, incumbent Republican governor John Engler was term-limited and not able to run for re-election to a fourth term in office. The Republicans unified around Engler's lieutenant governor, Dick Posthumus. Meanwhile, Granholm faced a competitive primary against former U.S. Ambassador to Canada and governor James Blanchard and U.S. Representative and former House Minority Whip David E. Bonior. Blanchard had been defeated for reelection by Engler in 1990 and Bonior had resigned as Democratic whip to run for governor, his House district having been redrawn to make it all but unwinnable for him.

Granholm, seen by many as a "fresh face" after the 12-year Engler administration, raised more money than Blanchard and Bonior and consistently led them in polls by large margins. Her campaign led to increased turnout among women and she comfortably won the Democratic primary with 499,129 votes (47.69%) to Bonior's 292,958 (27.99%) and Blanchard's 254,586 (24.32%).

Granholm was the heavy favorite in the general election, boasting strong support from working women, African-Americans and voters under 30 years of age. She campaigned on her record on crime and was seen as more charismatic than Posthumus. Despite the 2002 elections being a good year for Republicans nationwide, who gained control of the U.S. Senate and increased their hold on the U.S. House, Granholm defeated Posthumus by 1,633,796 votes (51.42%) to 1,506,104 (47.40%).

=== First term (2003–2007) ===
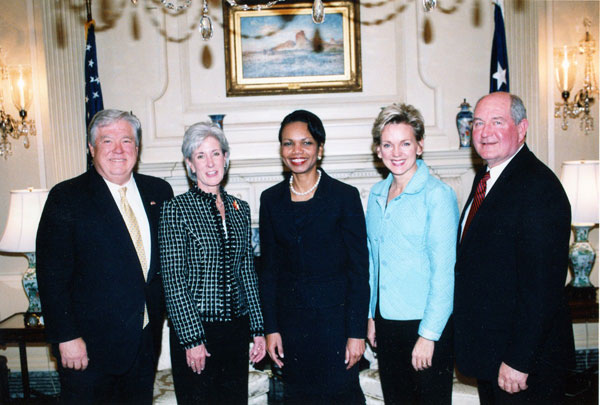
Left to right: Mississippi Governor Haley Barbour, Kansas Governor Kathleen Sebelius, U.S. Secretary of State Condoleezza Rice, Granholm and Georgia Governor Sonny Perdue (c. 2004).

Granholm was sworn in as the 47th governor of the state of Michigan on January 1, 2003. Upon her inauguration, in addition to becoming the state's first female governor, she also became its third governor who was not a natural-born citizen of the United States and its fourth who was not born within the United States. The earlier two non-natural-born citizens were Fred M. Warner, who was born in England and was the 26th governor from 1905 to 1911; and John Swainson, who was also born in Canada and was the 42nd governor from 1961 to 1963. George W. Romney, who was born in Mexico and was the 27th governor from 1963 to 1969, was a natural-born citizen by virtue of his parents' U.S. citizenship at the time of his birth.

Granholm emphasized Michigan's need to attract young people and businesses via the Cool Cities Initiative. As governor, she was a member of the National Governors Association, chairing its Health and Human Services Committee and co‑chairing its Health Care Task Force. She is also a former chair of the Midwestern Governors Association. She lived in the official Michigan Governor's Residence, located near the Capitol Building.

During Granholm's first year in office, she made a significant number of budget cuts to deal with a $1.7 billion deficit (about two percent of the annual state budget). She was upset by proposals to cut state funding to social welfare programs, such as homeless shelters and mental health agencies.

Granholm has been a proponent of education reform since the first year of her term. In her first State of the State Address in 2003, Granholm announced Project Great Start to focus on reforming education for children from birth to age five. Project Great Start has coordinated public and private efforts to encourage educating new parents and encouraging parents to read to their children.

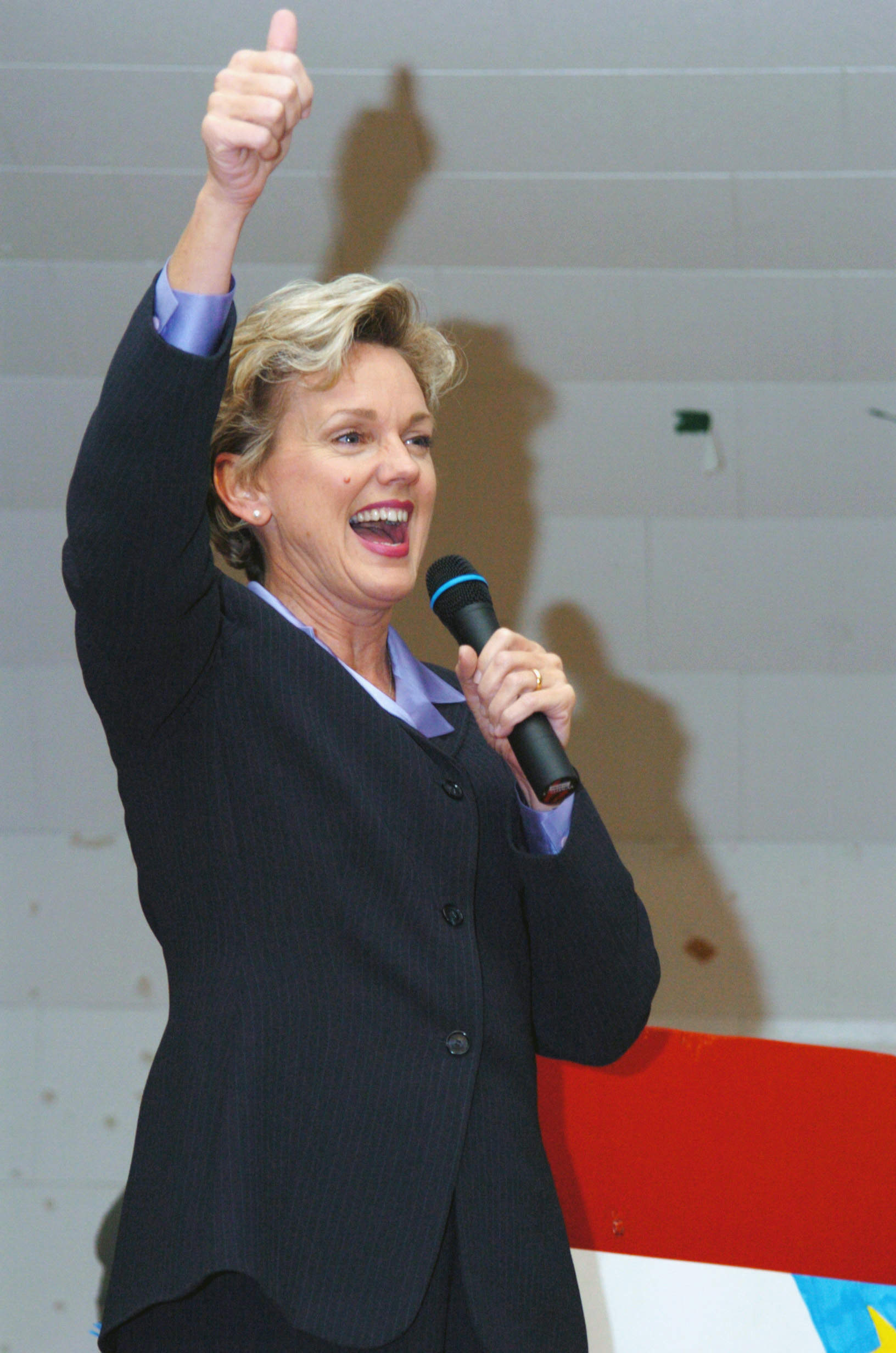
Granholm addressing troops returning to Michigan following a tour in Iraq, December 2005

Granholm emphasized post-secondary education for Michiganders following the decline in Michigan manufacturing jobs, many of which did not require a college degree. In 2004 she asked Lieutenant Governor John D. Cherry to lead the Commission on Higher Education and Economic Growth to double the number of college graduates in Michigan. Many of the commission's recommendations were enacted into law during Granholm's tenure as governor, e.g. increasing high school graduation standards (The Michigan Merit Curriculum) so that every Michigan high school student takes a college preparatory curriculum, which includes four years of math and English/language arts and three years of science and social studies, beginning with students who entered high school in the fall of 2006.

At an awards ceremony on October 28, 2004, Granholm was inducted into the "Michigan Women's Hall of Fame". She has also been the recipient of the Michigan Jaycees 1999 "Outstanding Young Michiganders" and the YWCA "Woman of the Year" awards.

During the 2004 presidential election in Michigan, Granholm campaigned hard for Democratic nominee John Kerry after early polls showed President George W. Bush with a narrow lead. She cited the economy as the main concern for Michiganders, not the Iraq War or the war on terror, which meant that with "the deficit larger; the Dow dropping; unemployment claims up, hitting an all-time high; General Motors profits below expectations, with health claims crippling profits; flu vaccine in short supply; oil prices rising" her state was badly hit.

In February 2005, Michigan's Republican-dominated legislature refused to vote on Granholm's proposed state budget, citing concerns over cuts to state funding for higher education. In the previous years of Granholm's term, many cuts to higher education had been demanded and voted in the legislature in order to balance the state budget. The year before, Republican leaders had called Granholm a "do‑nothing governor", claiming that she failed to lead, while Democrats accused legislative Republicans of being obstructionist. In January 2005, Granholm presented an early budget proposal, demanded immediate response from the Legislature, and held a press conference outlining the highlights of the proposed budget. After refusing to consider, debate, or vote on the proposed budget, Republicans stated they would prefer that the legislature have more involvement in the formation of the state budget.

Michigan's economy had been losing jobs since 2000, largely owing to the decline in the American manufacturing sector. Granholm supported diversification of Michigan's economy away from its historical reliance on automotive manufacturing. She pushed through a $2 billion 21st Century Jobs Fund to attract jobs to Michigan in the life sciences, alternative energy, advanced manufacturing, and homeland security sectors.

=== 2006 election ===
Granholm ran for a second term in the 2006 election. Her opponent was Republican businessman and politician Dick DeVos.

Both the Granholm campaign and the Michigan Democratic Party put out television commercials produced by Joe Slade White focusing on her efforts to revive Michigan's economy and accusing DeVos of cutting Michigan jobs while he was head of Amway. Granholm won re-election, defeating DeVos. The election results were 56% for Granholm, 42% for DeVos, and a little over one percent for minor-party candidates Gregory Creswell, Douglas Campbell, and Bhagwan Dashairya. Granholm's share of the vote was 4.9 percent higher than in her first gubernatorial election in 2002. Granholm's campaign was managed by Howard Edelson.

=== Second term (2007–2011) ===
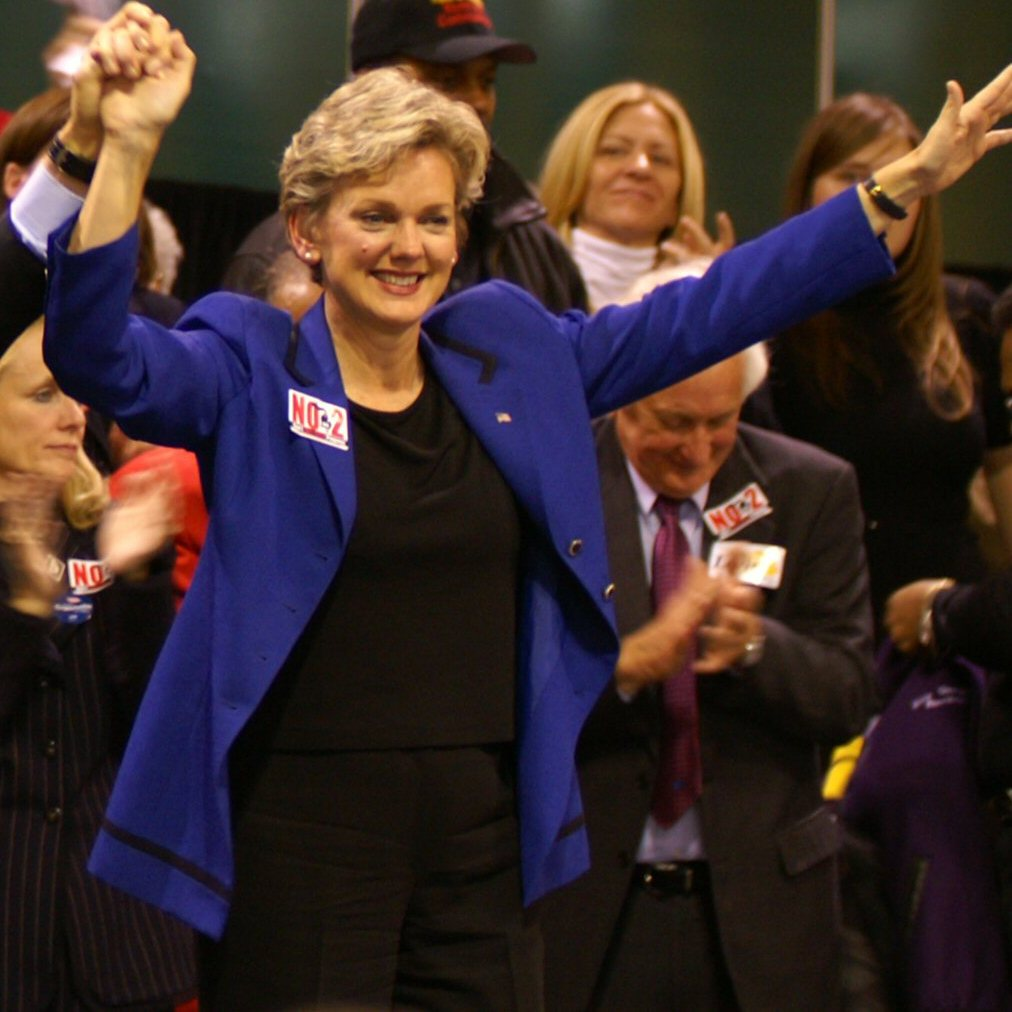
Granholm at a campaign event in November 2006

The 2006 elections saw a return to power by the Democrats in the State House of Representatives and the retention of Republican control over the State Senate. The partisan division of power in Michigan's state government led to a showdown between Granholm and lawmakers over the FY 2008 state budget that resulted in a four-hour shutdown of nonessential state services in the early morning of October 1, 2007, until a budget was passed and signed. The budget cut services, froze state spending in areas such as the arts, increased the state income tax, and created a new set of service taxes on a variety of businesses, e.g. ski lifts and interior design and landscaping companies, to address a state budget shortfall. As a result of the controversial budget, some taxpayer and business advocates called for a recall campaign against Granholm and lawmakers who voted for the tax increases.

The budget crisis eventually led Standard & Poor's to downgrade Michigan's credit rating from AA to AA−. Additionally, the crisis contributed to sinking approval ratings for Granholm, which went from 43 percent in August 2007 to a low of 32 percent in December 2007. She had one of the lowest approval ratings for any governor in the United States.

In 2007 Granholm proposed and signed into law the No Worker Left Behind Act to provide two years of free training or community college for unemployed and displaced workers. Since its launch in August 2007, more than 130,000 people have enrolled in retraining. The program caps tuition assistance at $5000 per year for two years, or $10,000 per person, and covers retraining in high-demand occupations and emerging industries.

The Department of Energy, Labor, and Economic Growth reported back in October 2009 that 62,206 people had enrolled and that of the 34,355 who had completed training, 72% had found work or retained their positions and a further 18,000 were still in long-term or short-term training. 16% of all enrollees had withdrawn or failed to complete the training. As of July 2010, more than two years after the program was launched, 65,536 people were in training or involved in on-the-job training. Dropouts had been reduced to 13.1% of enrollments.

Granholm delivered her sixth State of the State address on January 29, 2008. The speech focused mainly on creating jobs in Michigan through bringing alternative energy companies to Michigan. Through passing a renewable portfolio standard, which would require that ten percent of Michigan's energy would come from renewable sources by 2015 and twenty-five percent by 2025, Granholm expected the alternative energy industry to emerge in Michigan. Since the passage of the standard, Mariah Power, Global Wind Systems, Cascade Swift Turbine, Great Lakes Turbine, and 38 other companies have announced new projects in Michigan. The solar and wind power industries now provide more than ten thousand jobs in Michigan.

Granholm also called in the speech for an incentive package to offer tax breaks to filmmakers who shoot in Michigan and use local crews in production. A package of bills offering film industry incentives was approved by both houses of the Michigan legislature and signed into law by Granholm on April 7, 2008.

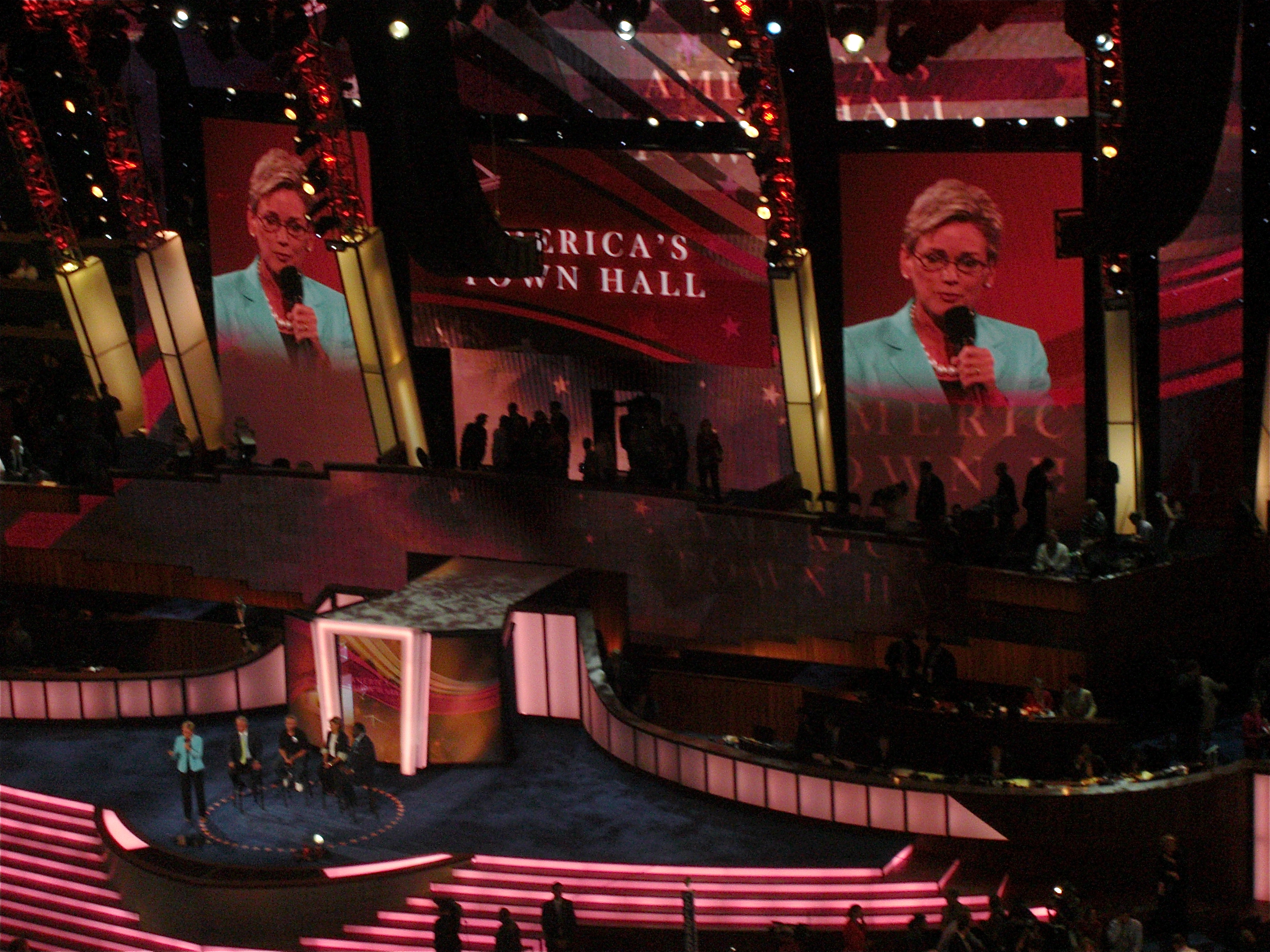
Granholm hosts a panel of advisers to Barack Obama's presidential campaign during the second day of the 2008 Democratic National Convention in Denver, Colorado.

Partly because of pressure from Granholm, Michigan's Democratic presidential primary was moved up to January 15, leading the Democratic National Committee to strip the Michigan Democratic Party of its delegates (Michigan historically had held its caucuses on February 9). Granholm has been named by some as a possible candidate for United States attorney general. She was the policy chair of the Democratic Governors Association.

On April 29, 2008, Granholm had emergency surgery to correct a health issue that stemmed from a 1993 accident. Because of the surgery, Granholm had to postpone a trip to Israel and Kuwait. She finally made the journey in November 2008 and signed a water technology partnership agreement with the Israeli government. In addition, she delivered the keynote address at an automotive event organized by the Michigan Israel Business Bridge and the Israel Export Institute.

In response to a May 14, 2008 resolution by the Detroit City Council that Granholm remove Detroit Mayor Kwame Kilpatrick from office because of eight and later ten felony counts against him, Granholm began an inquiry that culminated in a removal hearing on September 3, 2008. On September 3, Granholm outlined the legal basis for the hearings, arguments were made, and three witnesses were called. On the morning of September 4, Kilpatrick agreed to two plea deals in which he pleaded guilty to two counts of perjury and no contest one count of assaulting and obstructing a police officer in two separate cases. Both deals required his resignation. When the hearing reconvened later that day, Granholm said the hearing would be adjourned until September 22 as a result of the plea deals, and if Kilpatrick's resignation became effective before then the hearing would be cancelled.

In September 2008, Governor Granholm undertook the role of Republican vice presidential nominee Sarah Palin in a series of practice debates with Democratic vice presidential nominee Joe Biden.

With the election of Barack Obama as president, Granholm joined his economic advisory team, having had extensive experience running the Michigan economy, and there was speculation that she might join the Obama administration. On May 13, 2009, the Associated Press reported that President Obama was considering Granholm, among others, for possible appointment to the United States Supreme Court. Eventually Obama chose Sonia Sotomayor.

In 2010, Granholm was barred from seeking re-election due to Michigan's term limits law. Her governorship ended on January 1, 2011, when Republican Rick Snyder, who won the 2010 election, was sworn in.

== Subsequent career ==
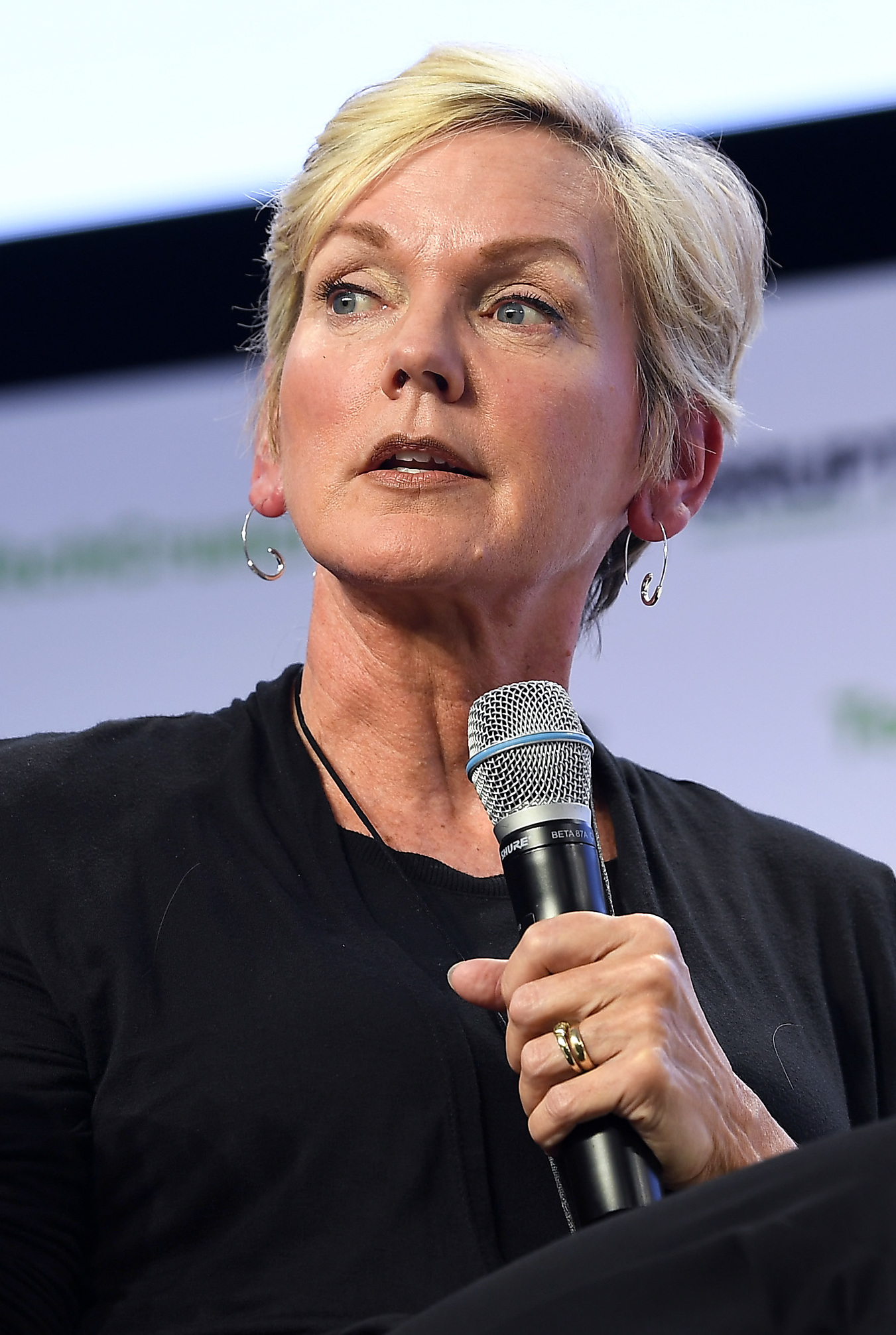
Granholm speaking at TechCrunch Disrupt 2019

Granholm is a distinguished adjunct professor of law and public policy at the UC Berkeley Goldman School of Public Policy and UC Berkeley School of Law. In the Autumn of 2011, she taught a graduate course entitled "Governing in Tough Times". She is also a senior research fellow at the Berkeley Energy and Climate Institute (BECI). As a senior advisor to The Pew Charitable Trusts' Clean Energy Program and founder of The American Jobs Project at UC Berkeley, Granholm spearheads a campaign for a national clean energy policy that promotes and funds American energy independence and home-grown manufacturing and innovation for wind, solar, and advanced battery industries across the United States. She is a regular contributor to NBC's political talk show Meet the Press, has written on U.S. energy policy and has co-authored a book with her husband, A Governor's Story: The Fight For Jobs and America's Economic Future, which was released in September 2011 and was about the lessons Michigan's experience can offer to America.

Granholm served on the board of directors of the Dow Chemical Company from March to October 2011. In May 2011, she joined the board of directors of Marinette Marine Corporation, a Wisconsin ship builder and Defense contractor. Granholm is currently serving as the sponsor of USS Marinette, a warship under construction by the company. In August 2013, she joined the board of Talmer Bancorp, a Michigan financial institution, remaining on the board until the bank was sold in September 2016. In August 2016, she joined the board of ChargePoint, a corporation which manages a network of electric vehicle charging stations. In March 2017, Granholm also joined the board of Proterra, a manufacturer of electric buses and charging stations.

In October 2011, Current TV announced that she would be joining its new political primetime lineup as host of the new program The War Room with Jennifer Granholm. In January 2013, she announced that she was leaving the network due to the sale to Al Jazeera.

In October 2012, she became a "household name" after delivering what has been described as a "hyperactive" and "sharp-tongued" speech at the 2012 Democratic National Convention in Charlotte, North Carolina, on September 6. Granholm's speech centered on the automotive industry crisis of 2008–2010; specifically, President Obama's decision to bail out General Motors and Chrysler, its beneficial effects on the U.S. economy, and Mitt Romney's opposition to the bailout.

In January 2014, she was picked to co-chair Priorities USA Action opposite Jim Messina. She has previously said Hillary Clinton "is the strongest candidate out there should she decide to raise her hand" in regard to the upcoming 2016 presidential election. Granholm previously supported Clinton over Barack Obama in the 2008 election campaign. She considered running for the United States Senate in 2014 to replace retiring Democrat Carl Levin, but decided against doing so.

In August 2015, months after Hillary Clinton's campaign announcement for the 2016 presidential election, Granholm transitioned from Priorities USA Action to Correct the Record, another Clinton-aligned political committee whose classification allows Granholm to serve as a direct "surrogate" for Hillary Clinton on the campaign trail. In August 2016, Granholm was named by Clinton to the team planning for her potential presidential transition.

=== Speculation of a return to office ===
Granholm was twice mentioned as a possible U.S. Secretary of Energy, first in December 2008 when President-elect Obama was assembling his first-term Cabinet and again in December 2010, when it was rumored that Secretary Steven Chu might resign.

Granholm was also twice considered by President Obama to be a potential Supreme Court candidate. In May 2009, she was on the shortlist of candidates to replace the retiring Associate Justice David Souter. She attended a CAFE standards meeting at the White House on May 19 and spoke with Obama, but officials would not comment on whether the two discussed a potential court appointment. Obama chose Sonia Sotomayor, who was confirmed by the Senate in August. After the retirement of Associate Justice John Paul Stevens in May 2010, Granholm was again spoken of as a potential candidate; Obama chose Elena Kagan, who was confirmed in August.

In March 2011, with Tim Kaine poised to resign as chairman of the Democratic National Committee to run for the U.S. Senate from Virginia in 2012, Granholm was mentioned as a potential successor. However, she made clear early on that she was not interested, which was reported to have "stunned" senior Democrats, who were "surprised and disappointed" that Granholm had taken herself out of the running. U.S. Representative Debbie Wasserman Schultz of Florida was elected instead.

After President Obama was re-elected in 2012, Granholm was reportedly considered for a position in Obama's second-term Cabinet, specifically to succeed Chu as secretary of energy, Ray LaHood as U.S. secretary of transportation, Hilda Solis as U.S. secretary of labor or Eric Holder as U.S attorney general. Granholm herself dampened such speculation, citing her sharp criticism of Republicans during the 2012 election and her time presenting on Current TV.

In March 2013, Michigan's senior U.S. senator, Democrat Carl Levin, announced that he would not run for a seventh term in 2014. Granholm was mentioned as a candidate to succeed him, but she announced shortly after that she would not run. She endorsed U.S. Representative Gary Peters, who defeated Republican nominee Terri Lynn Land in the general election.

In September 2014, when U.S. Attorney General Eric Holder announced his intention to step down, there was speculation that Granholm might be a potential candidate to succeed him. Loretta Lynch was ultimately nominated and confirmed for the position.

There was speculation that Granholm's increased visibility from her senior role in the Clinton campaign indicated that she would be under consideration for a position in the U.S. Cabinet or Democratic National Committee leadership if Clinton had won the 2016 election.

== Secretary of Energy (2021–2025) ==
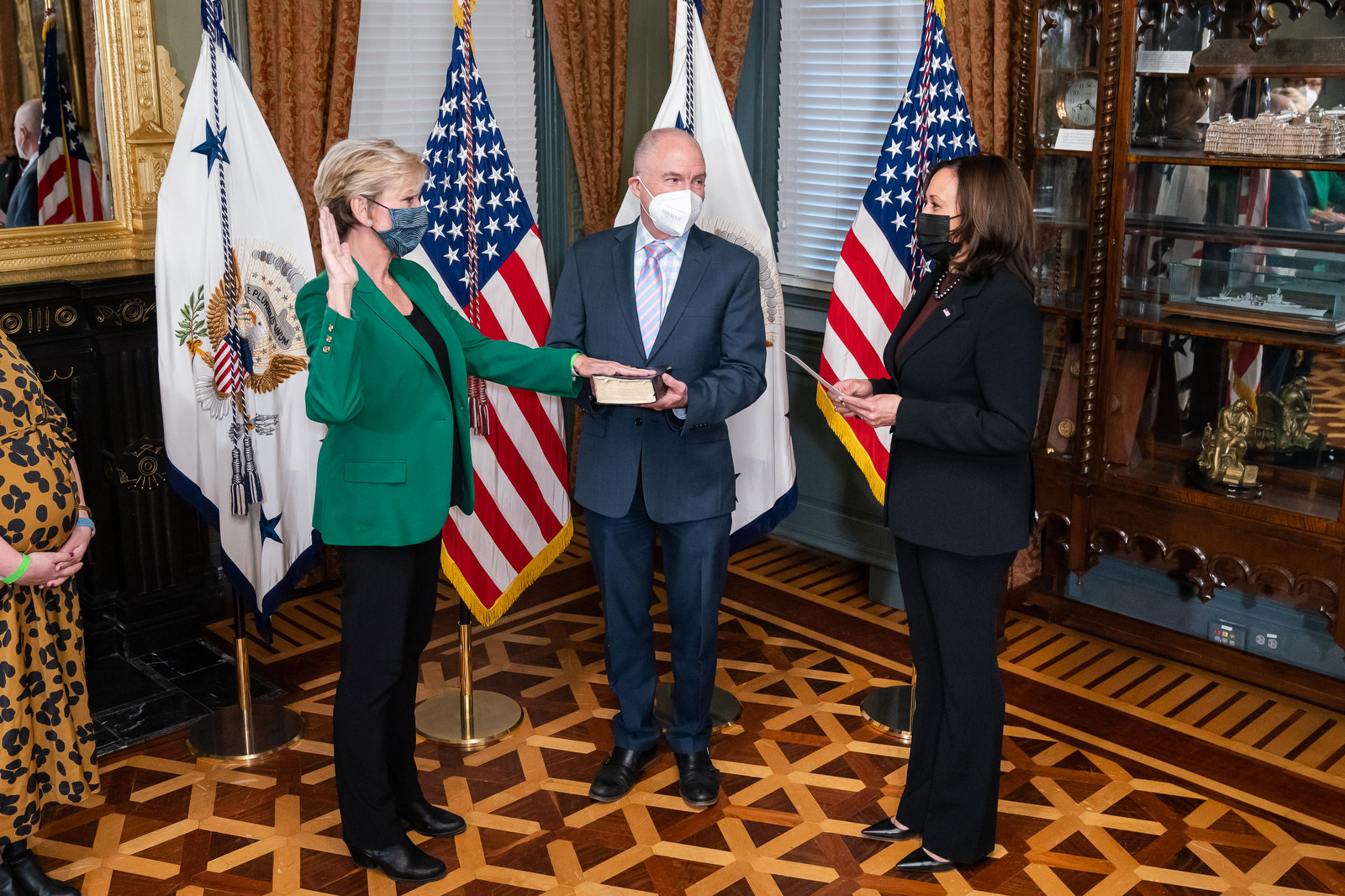
Granholm sworn in as Secretary of Energy by Vice President Kamala Harris in February 2021

=== Nomination and confirmation ===
Then-President-elect Joe Biden nominated Granholm to be the next secretary of energy. Granholm was seen as one of Biden's least controversial nominees, winning support from unions, environmental groups, and some Republicans. University of California, Berkeley professor of energy Daniel Kammen, who worked with Granholm at UC Berkeley, said she will be "phenomenal for DOE" because "she understands the technology, she understands deployment and she knows how to run a big agency." She appeared before the Senate Energy and Natural Resources Committee on January 27, 2021, and the committee voted to advance her nomination in a 13–4 vote on February 3, 2021. She was confirmed by the Senate with a 64–35 vote on February 25, 2021, and was sworn into office later that day by Vice President Kamala Harris. She is the first secretary of energy born outside the United States.

=== Tenure ===
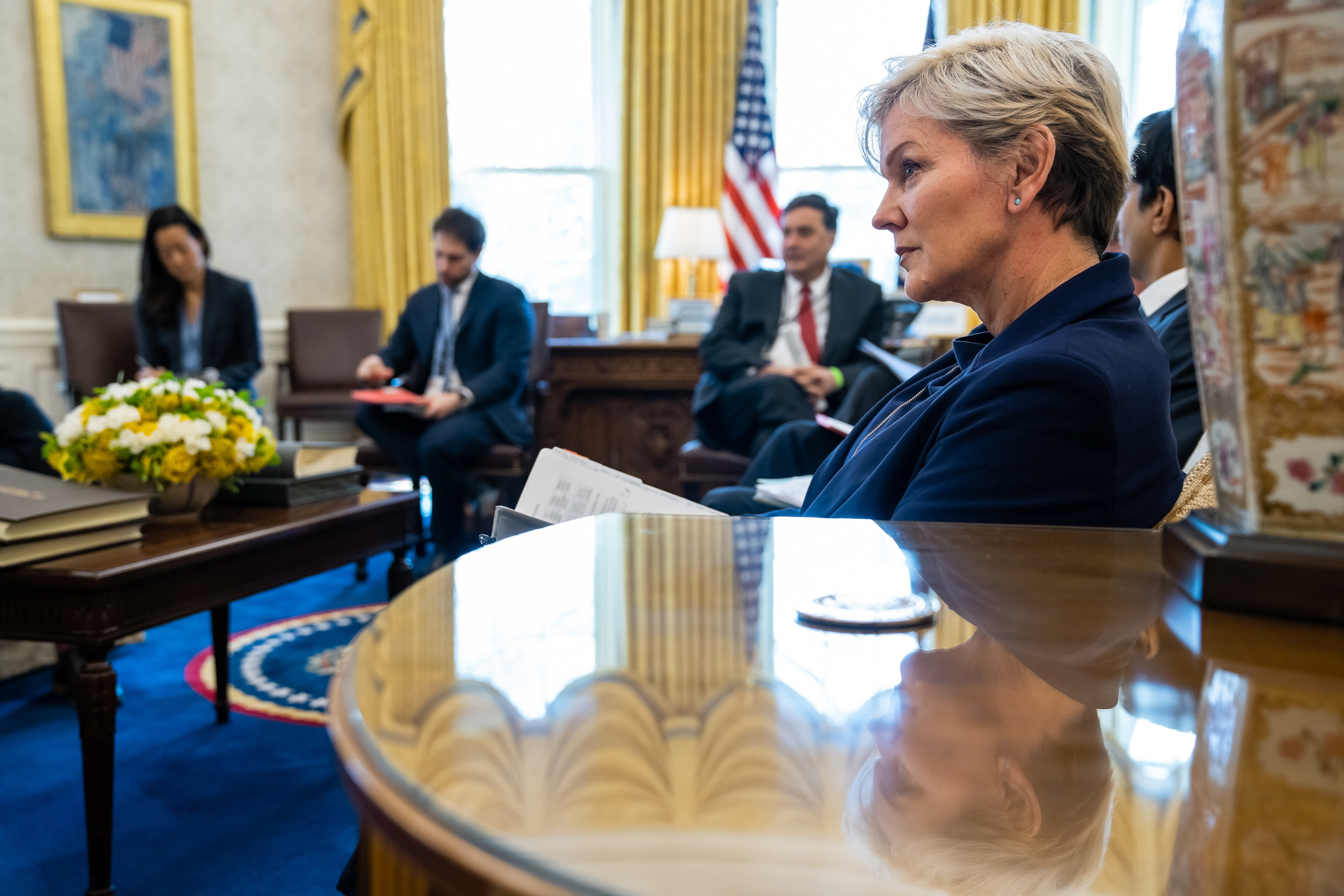
Granholm meets with President Biden in the Oval Office in March 2022.

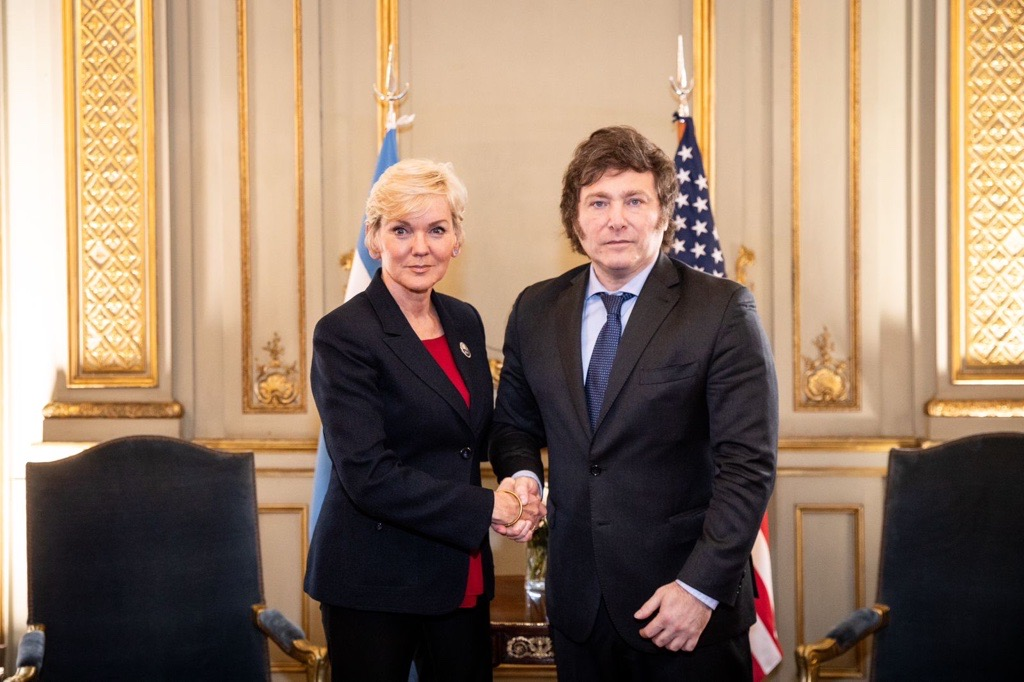
Granholm alongside Argentine President Javier Milei upon his inauguration in December 2023

In April 2021, she said President Joe Biden "has a goal of getting to net zero carbon dioxide for this country by 2050. And that means that we have got to figure out ways to clean up our fossil fuel industry." On May 19, 2022, the Department of Energy announced a $3.5 billion program funded under the Infrastructure Investment and Jobs Act to create four large-scale regional direct air capture hubs each consisting of a network of carbon dioxide removal projects.

Granholm had a call with Saudi Energy Minister Prince Abdulaziz bin Salman Al Saud. They discussed closer cooperation in the energy field. In late 2021, she blamed the OPEC oil cartel led by Saudi Arabia and the U.S. gas and petroleum industry for rising fuel prices in the United States. When asked what her plans were to increase oil production in the United States, she laughingly replied: "That is hilarious. Would that I had the magic wand on this."

Granholm signed a detailed ethics agreement for the top energy government job and has since then, violated certain provisions of the STOCK Act.

On December 16, 2022, Granholm posthumously cleared J. Robert Oppenheimer, American theoretical physicist, often credited as the "father of the atomic bomb" for his role in the Manhattan Project – the World War II undertaking that developed the first nuclear weapons, of the 1954 revocation of his security clearance due to a "flawed investigation".

== Post–Biden administration career ==
After serving a full term as Secretary of Energy, Granholm joined the lobbying firm DGA Group as a senior counselor.

In November 2025, Granholm was appointed as co-chair of New Jersey Governor–elect Mikie Sherrill's committee to review energy costs in New Jersey.

Granholm remains an active voice on energy and data center matters, which she believes are necessary for American competitiveness, provided they are required to pay for the required grid upgrades and expansions. That should not fall on local ratepayers. She also promotes battery storage for data centers as a way to take pressure off the grid. The permitting process must remain transparent and keep community concerns high on their agenda.

== Personal life ==
While Granholm was at Harvard, she met fellow law student and Michigan native Daniel Mulhern, a theology graduate from Yale University. They married in 1986 and they took each other's surname as their middle names. They have three children.

On October 21, 2010, Granholm was made a Commander of the Royal Order of the Polar Star, First Class, by the King of Sweden "for her work in fostering relations between Michigan and Sweden to promote a clean energy economy".

Granholm is Catholic. She converted to Catholicism while at Harvard Law School.

== Electoral history ==
2006 Michigan gubernatorial election
Party	Candidate	Votes	%	±%
Democratic	Jennifer Granholm (incumbent)	2,142,513	56.3	+4.9
Republican	Dick DeVos	1,608,086	42.3	−5.1
Libertarian	Greg Creswell	23,524	0.6	n/a
Green	Douglas Campbell	20,009	0.5	−0.3
Constitution	Bhagwan Dashairya	7,087	0.2	−0.3
Write-in		37	0.0	n/a
Majority		534,427	14.0	+10
Turnout		3,801,256	100	+19.6
Democratic hold		Swing		

2002 Michigan gubernatorial election
Party	Candidate	Votes	%	±%
Democratic	Jennifer Granholm	1,633,796	51.42	+13.64
Republican	Dick Posthumus	1,506,104	47.40	−14.81
Green	Douglas Campbell	25,236	0.79	
Constitution	Joseph Pilchak	12,411	0.3	
Write-in		18	0.00	
Majority		127,692	4.02	
Turnout		3,177,565		
Democratic gain from Republican				

2002 Michigan gubernatorial election – Democratic primary
Party	Candidate	Votes	%	±%
Democratic	Jennifer Granholm	499,129	47.69	
Democratic	David E. Bonior	292,958	27.99	
Democratic	James Blanchard	254,586	24.32	
Majority		206,171	19.7	

1998 Michigan Attorney General election
Party	Candidate	Votes	%	±%
Democratic	Jennifer Granholm	1,557,310	52.09	
Republican	John Smietanka	1,432,604	47.91	
Majority		124,706	4.17	
Turnout		2,989,914	100	
Democratic hold		Swing		

== See also ==
- Barack Obama Supreme Court candidates
- List of female state attorneys general in the United States
- List of female governors in the United States
- List of female United States Cabinet members
- List of foreign-born United States Cabinet members
- List of United States governors born outside the United States

Party political offices
Preceded by Frank J. Kelley	Democratic nominee for Attorney General of Michigan; 1998	Succeeded by Gary Peters
Preceded by Geoffrey Fieger	Democratic nominee for Governor of Michigan; 2002, 2006	Succeeded by Virgil Bernero
Legal offices
Preceded by Frank Kelley	Attorney General of Michigan; 1999–2003	Succeeded by Mike Cox
Political offices
Preceded by John Engler	Governor of Michigan; 2003–2011	Succeeded by Rick Snyder
Preceded by Dan Brouillette	United States Secretary of Energy; 2021–2025	Succeeded by Chris Wright
U.S. order of precedence (ceremonial)
Preceded by Denis McDonough as Former U.S. Cabinet Member	Order of precedence of the United States as Former U.S. Cabinet Member	Succeeded by Miguel Cardona as Former U.S. Cabinet Member
