= John Smietanka =

American attorney (1941–2025)

United States Attorney for the Western District of Michigan
- In office 1981–1994
- President: Ronald Reagan
- Preceded by: Robert C. Greene
- Succeeded by: Thomas J. Gezon

Personal details
- Born: June 28, 1941 Chicago, Illinois, U.S.
- Died: October 28, 2025 (aged 84) St. Joseph, Michigan, U.S.
- Party: Republican
- Education: B.A., Our Lady of the Snow, 1964; J.D., John Marshall Law School, 1968
- Profession: Attorney

John Allan Smietanka (June 28, 1941 – October 28, 2025) was an American attorney who was the prosecutor for Berrien County, Michigan, from 1974 to 1981. He was also a United States Attorney in the Western District of Michigan, appointed by Ronald Reagan, from 1981 until 1994.

== Career as a U.S. attorney ==
Notable cases that Smietanka handled in the U.S. Attorney's office include the disappearance of West German freight ship captain Fredrich Helling in Lake Michigan, an investigation into sales of diluted orange juice, and a major Chicago gang prosecution which fell apart amid accusations of inappropriate favors given to prosecution witnesses. Smiteanka also worked with Michigan Attorney General Frank J. Kelley to prosecute state representative Stephen Shepich and other people connected with fraud in the Michigan House Fiscal Agency.

The United States Attorney General's office gave him an award for outstanding service in 1989 and for distinguished service in 1993, and the John Marshall Law School (Chicago) honored him as a distinguished alumnus in 1986.

== Failed nomination to the Sixth Circuit ==
On January 24, 1992, President George H. W. Bush nominated Smietanka to be a judge of the United States Court of Appeals for the Sixth Circuit. However, with the Democrats controlling the U.S. Senate Judiciary Committee, Smietanka's nomination languished, and it lapsed with the end of Bush's presidency. President Bill Clinton did not renominate Smietanka to the Sixth Circuit.

== Run for Attorney General ==
In 1994 and 1998, Smietanka was the Republican candidate for Michigan Attorney General, but lost in both years to his opponents. In 1998 he lost to future Governor of Michigan Jennifer Granholm.

== Later work ==
Smietanka later worked in private practice as a partner in Smietanka, Buckleitner, Steffes and Gezon, a Michigan law firm. In 2005, he helped free Larry Souter, wrongfully convicted as a murderer, a case for which he was honored as Lawyer of the Year by Michigan Lawyers Weekly. He was one of the attorneys for İbrahim Parlak, a Kurd whom the United States attempted to deport. In 2007, Smietanka was one of two lawyers chosen by John McCain to co-chair Lawyers for McCain in Michigan, a coalition of Michigan attorneys, as part of his presidential campaign. Since 2001 Smietanka had been an instructor for an annual program held by the John Marshall Law School in Luhačovice, in the Czech Republic, to educate young Czech and Slovak lawyers about the American legal system.

== Death ==
Smietanka died in St. Joseph, Michigan, on October 28, 2025, at the age of 84.

== See also ==
- George H.W. Bush judicial appointment controversies

Legal offices
Preceded by Robert C. Greene	United States Attorney for the Western District of Michigan; 1981–1994	Succeeded by Thomas J. Gezon
Party political offices
Preceded by Clifford Taylor	Republican nominee for Michigan Attorney General; 1994, 1998	Succeeded by Mike Cox
