= Howard Edelson =

American political strategist, campaign manager

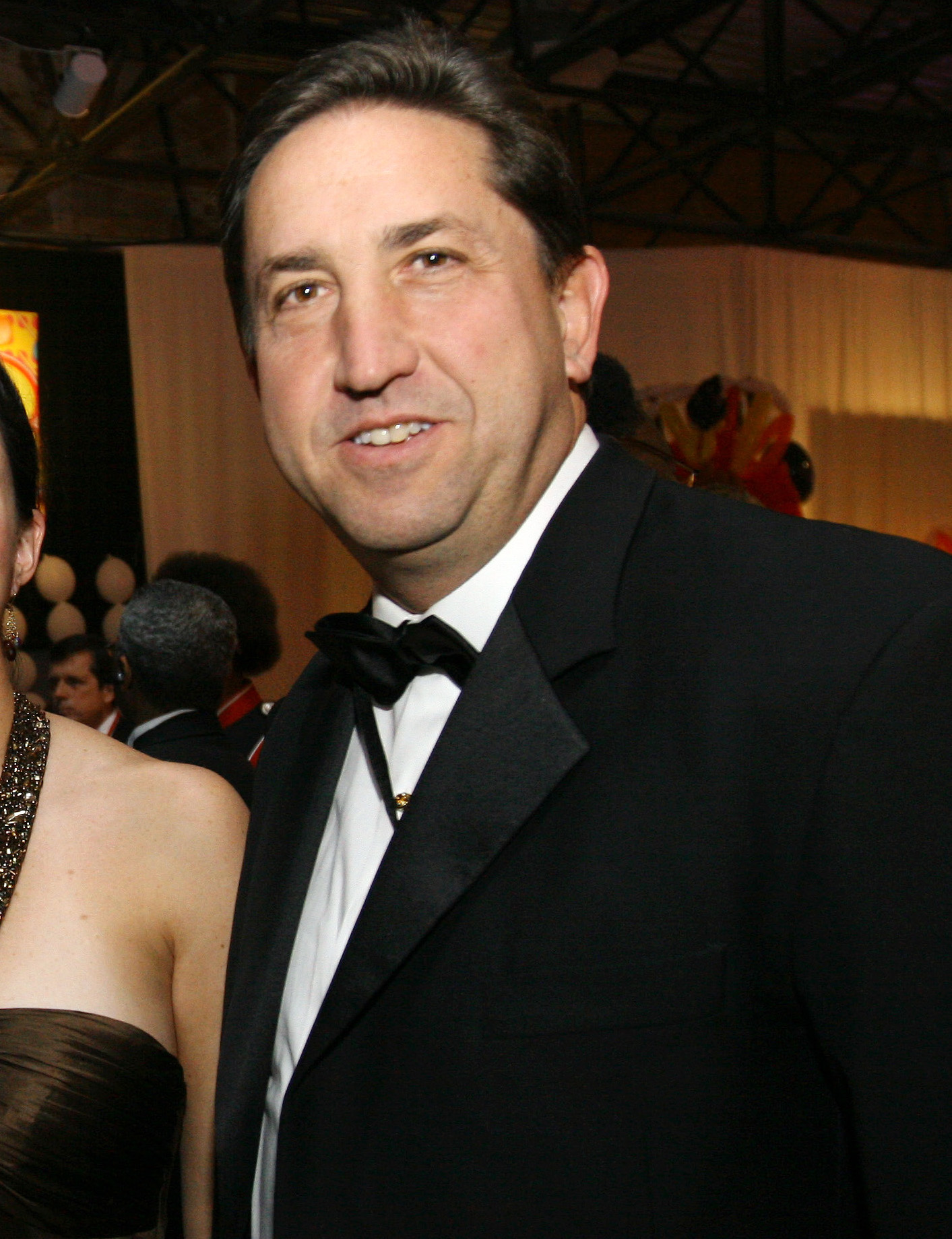
- Born: April 25, 1960 (age 66)
- Education: Michigan State University
- Occupation: Political Consultant
- Political party: Democratic Party
- Website: edelsongroup.com

Howard Edelson (born April 25, 1960) is an American political strategist, campaign manager, and regular political media commentator. Edelson is the founding partner of Michigan-based political consulting business, The Edelson Group. He was the campaign manager for former Michigan Governor Jennifer Granholm's successful 2006 re-election campaign. He has led other successful ballot measures in Michigan for affordable energy and tax reform

Edelson has also served as Chief of Staff to Congressman Milton Robert Carr and was the Head of International Business Development and Legislative Affairs at the Michigan Economic Development Corporation.

== Personal life ==
Edelson is a resident of Ann Arbor, Michigan.
