= Arcadia Bluffs Golf Course =

Golf club in Arcadia, Michigan

Arcadia Bluffs Golf Club
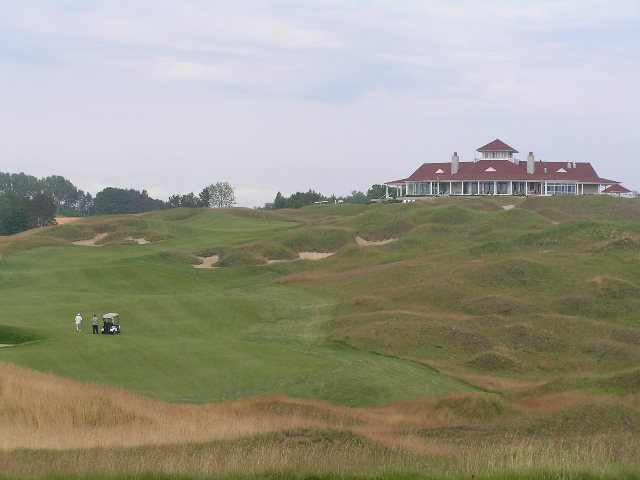
- 18th Hole and Clubhouse
- Interactive map of Arcadia Bluffs Golf Club
- 44°27′23″N 86°14′34″W

Club information
- Established: 1999
- Type: Public
- Tota holes: 36
- Website: http://www.arcadiabluffs.com

Arcadia Bluffs
- Designed by: Warren Henderson, Rick Smith
- Par: 72
- Length: 7,300 yds
- Course rating: 75.7
- Slope rating: 146

South Course
- Designed by: Dana Fry, Jason Straka
- Par: 72
- Length: 7,412 yds
- Course rating: 75.6
- Slope rating: 132

Arcadia Bluffs Golf Club, designed by Warren Henderson and Rick Smith, was founded in 1999 in Arcadia, Michigan. The course is built on the bluffs above the shore of Lake Michigan on approximately 245 acres (99 ha). The course drops 225 feet (69 m) from its highest point down to the bluff, 180 feet (55 m) above lake level and has 3,100 feet (940 m) of lake frontage. The golf course was designed to resemble seaside Irish links, with rolling terrain and windswept natural fescues throughout.

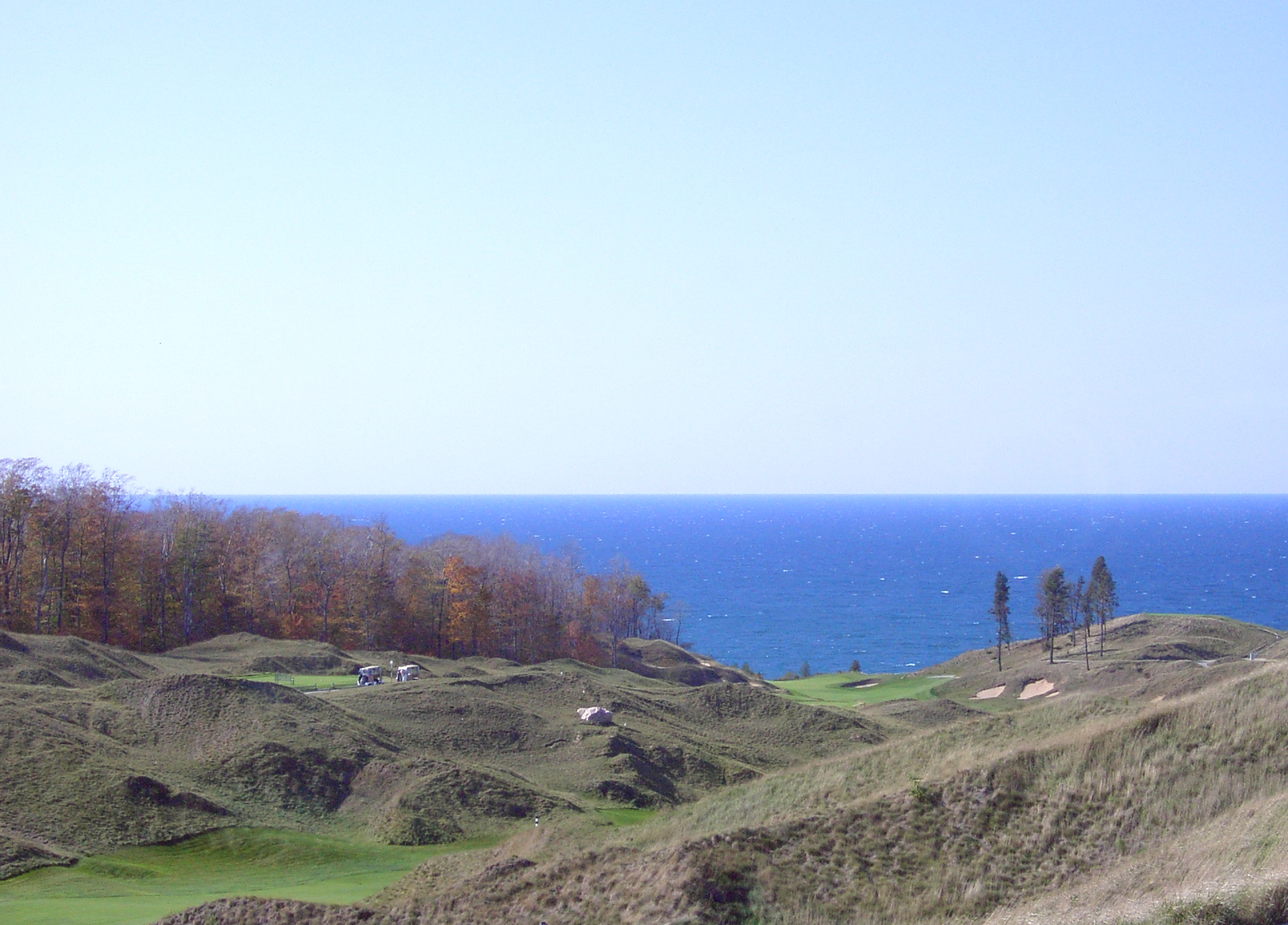
View from the clubhouse of the 10th and 11th holes overlooking Lake Michigan.

In 2018, golf architects Dana Fry and Jason Straka built the club's second course, the South Course, taking inspirations in their design from Charles Blair Macdonald and Seth Raynor.

Arcadia Bluffs
Tee	Rating/Slope	1	2	3	4	5	6	7	8	9	Out	10	11	12	13	14	15	16	17	18	In	Total
Championship	75.4 / 147	519	189	530	415	583	195	472	449	203	3555	481	633	431	240	340	519	486	176	439	3745	7300
Black	72.8 / 137	498	154	502	367	583	160	429	389	176	3258	424	594	431	190	340	464	459	167	375	3444	6702
Middle	70.3 / 129	459	144	467	311	557	149	409	352	162	3010	399	563	378	160	304	464	441	150	375	3234	6244
Forward	70.1 / 121	355	124	372	279	439	80	350	295	134	2428	359	477	293	135	245	358	376	129	307	2679	5107
Par		5	3	5	4	5	3	4	4	3	36	4	5	4	3	4	5	4	3	4	36	72
SI		15	17	7	13	3	9	1	5	11		2	12	10	8	14	18	4	16	6
