= 1998 Michigan Attorney General election =

- November 3, 1998
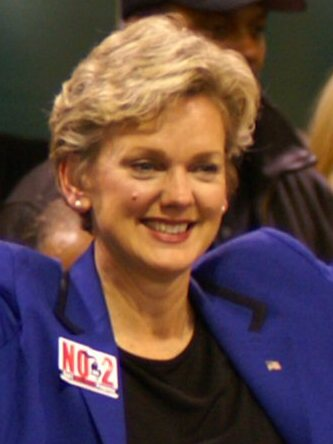

Nominee	Jennifer Granholm	John Smietanka
Party	Democratic	Republican
Popular vote	1,557,310	1,432,604
Percentage	52.09%	47.91%
- County results Granholm: 50–60% 60–70% Smietanka: 50-60% 60-70% 70-80%
Attorney General before election
Frank J. Kelley
Democratic
Elected Attorney General
Jennifer Granholm
Democratic

The 1998 Michigan Attorney General election was held on November 3, 1998. Democratic nominee Jennifer Granholm defeated Republican nominee John Smietanka with 52.09% of the vote.

== General election ==
=== Candidates ===
Major party candidates

- Jennifer Granholm, Democratic
- John Smietanka, Republican

=== Results ===
Michigan Attorney General election, 1998
Party	Candidate	Votes	%
Democratic	Jennifer Granholm	1,557,310	52.09
Republican	John Smietanka	1,432,604	47.91
Total votes		2,989,914	100
Democratic hold			
