= 1994 Michigan Attorney General election =

- November 8, 1994
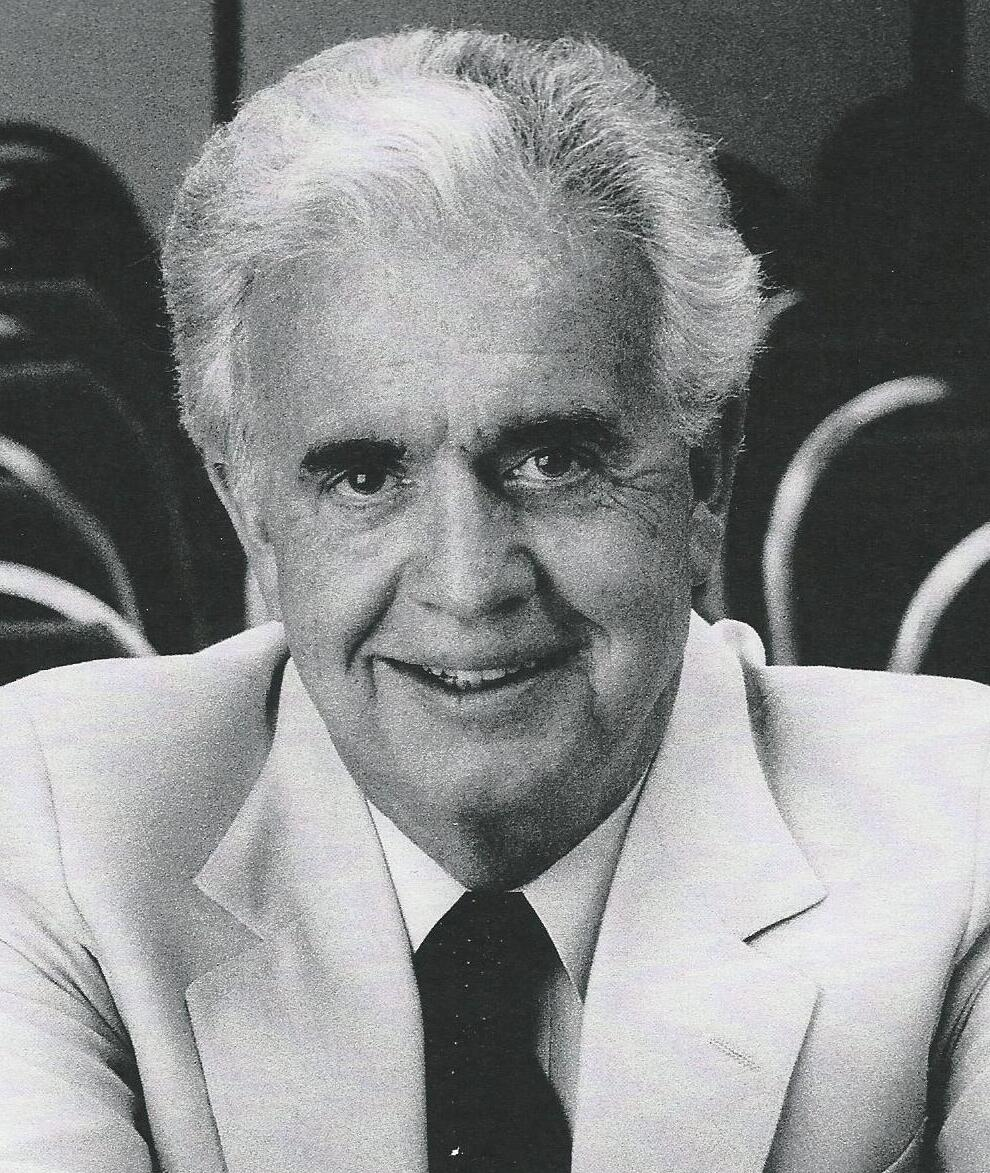

| Nominee | Frank J. Kelley | John Smietanka |
| Party | Democratic | Republican |
| Popular vote | 1,717,591 | 1,273,330 |
| Percentage | 57.41% | 42.56% |
- County results Kelley: 50–60% 60–70% 70–80% Smietanka: 50–60% 60–70% Tie: 50%
Attorney General before election
Frank J. Kelley
Democratic
Elected Attorney General
Frank J. Kelley
Democratic

The 1994 Michigan Attorney General election was held on November 8, 1994. Incumbent Democrat Frank J. Kelley defeated Republican nominee John Smietanka with 57.41% of the vote. Coinciding with Governor John Engler’s landslide re-election victory, Kelley’s margin of victory decreased from the previous election.

== General election ==
=== Candidates ===
Major party candidates

- Frank J. Kelley, Democratic
- John Smietanka, Republican

=== Results ===
Michigan Attorney General election, 1994
| Party | Candidate | Votes | % |
|---|---|---|---|
| Democratic | Frank J. Kelley (incumbent) | 1,717,591 | 57.41 |
| Republican | John Smietanka | 1,273,330 | 42.56 |
| Write-ins | | 799 | 0.03 |
| Total votes | | 2,991,720 | 100 |
| Democratic hold | | | |
