= Michigan Israel Business Accelerator =

US-Israeli economic organization

- Founded: MIBB 2007; 19 years ago / MIBA 2017
- Type: 501(c)(3) organization
- Tax ID no.: 26-1530156
- Location: Detroit, Michigan
- Region served: Michigan; Israel
- Method: Trade missions
- Website: michiganisrael.com
- Formerly called: Michigan Israel Business Bridge

The Michigan Israel Business Accelerator (MIBA) is an independent nonprofit economic development organization based in Detroit, Michigan.

It was founded in 2007 as the Michigan Israel Business Bridge (MIBB), which focused on strengthening business relationships between Michigan and Israel through convening, networking, and trade engagement.

In 2017, the MIBB transitioned into MIBA, reflecting an expanded focus on economic development, business growth, technology transfer, and helping Israeli companies enter the U.S. market through Michigan.

According to the organization, MIBA has generated more than $90 million in economic impact for Michigan since 2021, connected more than 5,000 business leaders between Michigan and Israel, and facilitated the exchange of more than 300 delegates. Since 2018, the Michigan Economic Development Corporation has provided $5.1 million to MIBA.

== History ==
The Michigan Israel Business Bridge (MIBB) was co-founded by Charles (Chuck) Newman and Susan Herman in 2007. Newman and Herman assisted a Michigan State University student's efforts to launch an exhibition featuring Israeli business and technology. The success of that event and others like it in Lansing and Grand Rapids compelled Newman to create MIBB. Haifa native Hannan Lis, CEO of Lis Ventures LLC and former president of the American Technion Society, is a third co-founder. Ron Perry of Ann Arbor, formerly with Medtronic, was taken on as executive director in 2008. Pamela Lippitt, formerly with the Zionist Organization of America, was named executive director in 2010.

In the years that followed, Michigan’s engagement with Israel expanded as state leaders placed greater emphasis on innovation, technology partnerships, and international economic collaboration. This broader shift contributed to MIBB’s later transition into the Michigan Israel Business Accelerator, reflecting a greater focus on business development, technology commercialization, and supporting Israeli companies entering the U.S. market through Michigan.

=== 2026 US-Israel Innovation Exchange Summit ===
On October 12 to 14, 2026, MIBA held the first US-Israel Innovation Exchange Summit at Huntington National Bank’s headquarters in Detroit in collaboration with the Paul E. Singer Foundation to deepen commercial and economic ties with Israel. The summit was attended by Elad Strohmayer, consul general of Israel to the Midwest, along with Chaim Martin, Israel's Minister of Economic Affairs to the United States.

On October 15, 2026, the summit ended with the signing of a Memorandum of Understanding (MoU) to establish "a national gateway for market intelligence, investment missions, Israeli business delegations, and joint technology pilots," along with the announcement of the US-Israel Innovation Exchange (USIIE).

== Programs and Activities ==
Governor Jennifer M. Granholm addressed the second annual Michigan Israel Business Bridge automotive partnership conference in Israel in 2008. In 2009, MIBB partnered with the Michigan Economic Development Corporation, the Israel Export and International Cooperation Institute and Automation Alley bringing together local Michigan executives and representatives from thirteen Israeli companies to discuss global economic challenges in Troy. Wayne State University and MIBB partnered in 2011 to launch the Michigan Israel Business Bridge internship program.

As of the 2020s, the organization’s work has expanded to include structured trade missions, targeted business matchmaking, and support for Israeli companies establishing a presence in Michigan through its soft-landing program, The Elevator. In 2026, MIBA served as Michigan’s representative to the BIRD Foundation and supported early collaboration with Israeli government partners on a soft-landing framework.

== Criticism ==
MIBA has been criticized for being taxpayer-funded through the Michigan Strategic Fund and Michigan Economic Development Corporation, and for facilitating the allocation of Michigan taxpayer funding to Israeli businesses. A campaign called "MI Money Out Of MIBA" was organized in advance of the US-Israel Innovation Exchange Summit, with protests against the conference over MIBA's receipt of public funds and the association's connections to the defense industry. The campaign is supported by Representative Rashida Tlaib, who wrote in October 2026 that Governor Whitmer can find funding for Israeli businesses that make bombs, but not local small businesses in Michigan.

== See also ==
- BIRD Foundation
- Economy of Michigan
- Economy of Israel
- Start-up Nation
- U.S.–Israel relations
