= 1981 in Michigan =

- Decades: 1960s; 1970s; 1980s; 1990s; 2000s
- See also: History of Michigan; Historical outline of Michigan; List of years in Michigan; 1981 in the United States

Events from the year 1981 in Michigan.

The Associated Press (AP) selected the state's top sports stories as follows:

1. The first championship boxing match between Thomas Hearns boxing match with Sugar Ray Leonard on September 16 and billed as "The Showdown";
2. Eric Hipple's taking over as the Detroit Lions' quarterback after an injury to Gary Danielson;
3. Michigan's victory over Washington in the 1981 Rose Bowl;
4. The Detroit Pistons' selection of Isiah Thomas and Kelly Tripucka with the second and twelfth picks in the first round of the 1981 NBA draft;
5. The Detroit Tigers' November 27 trade of Steve Kemp to the Chicago White Sox in exchange for Chet Lemon;
6. The development of Kirk Gibson as a Major League Baseball player, compiling a .328 batting average for the Detroit Tigers;
7. The death of University of Michigan football broadcaster Bob Ufer;
8. The inaugural Michigan 500 automobile race at the Michigan International Speedway;
9. The Detroit Red Wings' December 2 trade of Dale McCourt, Mike Foligno, and Brent Peterson to the Buffalo Sabres in exchange for Danny Gare, Jim Schoenfeld, and Derek Smith; and
10. The induction of Ernie Harwell into the Baseball Hall of Fame.

== Office holders ==
=== State office holders ===
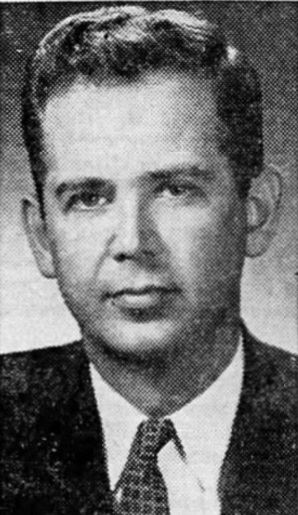
Gov. Milliken

- Governor of Michigan: William Milliken (Republican)
- Lieutenant Governor of Michigan: James H. Brickley (Republican)
- Michigan Attorney General: Frank J. Kelley (Democrat)
- Michigan Secretary of State: Richard H. Austin (Democrat)
- Speaker of the Michigan House of Representatives: Bobby Crim (Democrat)
- Majority Leader of the Michigan Senate: William Faust (Democrat)
- Chief Justice, Michigan Supreme Court: Mary S. Coleman

=== Mayors of major cities ===
- Mayor of Detroit: Coleman Young
- Mayor of Grand Rapids: Abe L. Drasin
- Mayor of Warren, Michigan: Ted Bates/James R. Randlett
- Mayor of Sterling Heights, Michigan: Anthony Dobry
- Mayor of Flint: James W. Rutherford
- Mayor of Dearborn: John O'Reilly, Sr.
- Mayor of Lansing: Gerald W. Graves/Terry John McKane
- Mayor of Ann Arbor: Louis Belcher (Republican)
- Mayor of Saginaw: Paul P. Prudhomme/Ronald M. Bushey

=== Federal office holders ===
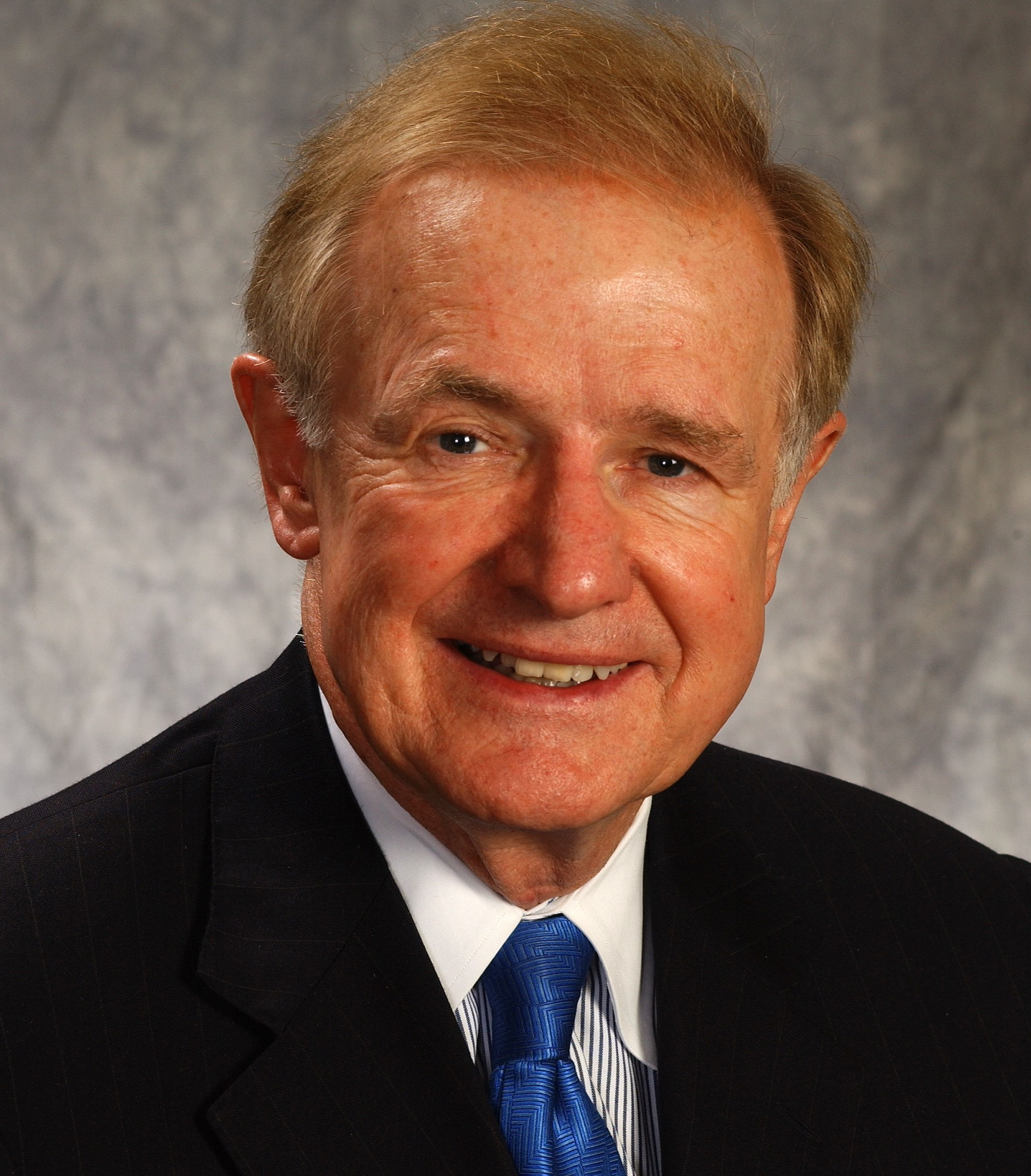
Sen. Riegle

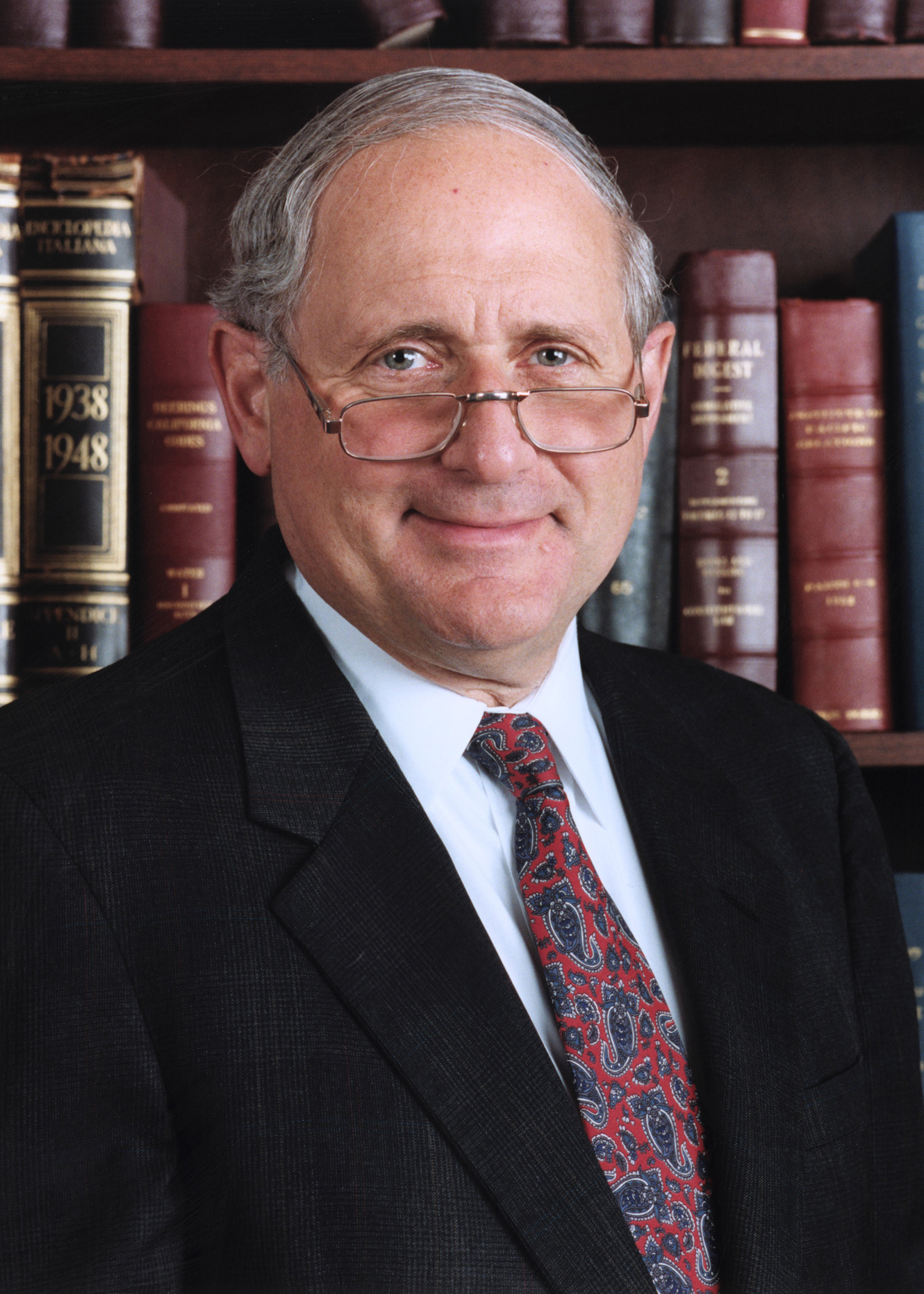
Sen. Levin

- U.S. Senator from Michigan: Donald W. Riegle Jr. (Democrat)
- U.S. Senator from Michigan: Carl Levin (Democrat)
- House District 1: John Conyers (Democrat)
- House District 2: Carl Pursell (Republican)
- House District 3: Howard Wolpe (Republican)
- House District 4: David Stockman (Republican)/Mark D. Siljander (Republican)
- House District 5: Harold S. Sawyer (Republican)
- House District 6: Jim Dunn (Republican)
- House District 7: Dale Kildee (Democrat)
- House District 8: J. Bob Traxler (Democrat)
- House District 9: Guy Vander Jagt (Republican)
- House District 10: Donald J. Albosta (Democrat)
- House District 11: Robert William Davis (Republican)
- House District 12: David Bonior (Democrat)
- House District 13: George Crockett Jr. (Democrat)
- House District 14: Dennis M. Hertel (Democrat)
- House District 15: William D. Ford (Democrat)
- House District 16: John Dingell (Democrat)
- House District 17: William M. Brodhead (Democrat)
- House District 18: James Blanchard (Democrat)
- House District 19: William Broomfield (Republican)

== Population ==
In the 1980 United States census, Michigan was recorded as having a population of 9,259,000 persons, ranking as the eighth most populous state in the country. By 1990, the state's population had grown only marginally by 0.4% to 9,259,000 persons.

=== Cities ===
The following is a list of cities in Michigan with a population of at least 50,000 based on 1980 U.S. Census data. Historic census data from 1970 and 1990 is included to reflect trends in population increases or decreases. Cities that are part of the Detroit metropolitan area are shaded in tan.

1980 Rank	City	County	1970 Pop.	1980 Pop.	1990 Pop.	Change 1980-90
1	Detroit	Wayne	1,514,063	1,203,368	1,027,974	−14.6% ▼
2	Grand Rapids	Kent	197,649	181,843	189,126	4.0% ▲
3	Warren	Macomb	179,260	161,134	144,864	−10.1% ▼
4	Flint	Genesee	193,317	159,611	140,761	−11.8% ▼
5	Lansing	Ingham	131,403	130,414	127,321	−2.4% ▼
6	Sterling Heights	Macomb	61,365	108,999	117,810	8.1% ▲
7	Ann Arbor	Washtenaw	100,035	107,969	109,592	1.5% ▲
8	Livonia	Wayne	110,109	104,814	100,850	−3.8% ▼
9	Dearborn	Wayne	104,199	90,660	89,286	−1.5%▼
10	Westland	Wayne	86,749	84,603	84,724	0.1% ▲
11	Kalamazoo	Kalamazoo	85,555	79,722	80,277	0.7% ▲
12	Taylor	Wayne	70,020	77,568	70,811	−8.7% ▼
13	Saginaw	Saginaw	91,849	77,508	69,512	−10.3% ▼
14	Pontiac	Oakland	85,279	76,715	71,166	−7.2% ▼
15	St. Clair Shores	Macomb	88,093	76,210	68,107	−10.6% ▼
16	Southfield	Oakland	69,298	75,608	75,745	0.2% ▲
17	Royal Oak	Oakland	86,238	70,893	65,410	−7.7% ▼
18	Dearborn Heights	Wayne	80,069	67,706	60,838	−10.1% ▼
19	Troy	Oakland	39,419	67,102	72,884	8.6% ▲
20	Wyoming	Kent	56,560	59,616	63,891	7.2% ▲
21	Farmington Hills	Oakland	--	58,056	74,611	28.5% ▲
22	Roseville	Macomb	60,529	54,311	51,412	−5.3% ▼
23	East Lansing	Ingham	47,540	51,392	50,677	−1.4% ▼

=== Counties ===
The following is a list of counties in Michigan with populations of at least 100,000 based on 1980 U.S. Census data. Historic census data from 1970 and 1990 are included to reflect trends in population increases or decreases. Counties that are part of the Detroit metropolitan area are shaded in tan.

1980 Rank	County	Largest city	1970 Pop.	1980 Pop.	1990 Pop.	Change 1980-90
1	Wayne	Detroit	2,666,751	2,337,891	2,111,687	−9.7% ▼
2	Oakland	Pontiac	907,871	1,011,793	1,083,592	7.1% ▲
3	Macomb	Warren	625,309	694,600	717,400	3.3% ▲
4	Genesee	Flint	444,341	450,449	430,459	−4.4% ▼
5	Kent	Grand Rapids	411,044	444,506	500,631	12.6% ▲
6	Ingham	Lansing	261,039	275,520	281,912	2.3% ▲
7	Washtenaw	Ann Arbor	234,103	264,748	282,937	6.9% ▲
8	Saginaw	Saginaw	219,743	228,059	211,946	−7.1% ▼
9	Kalamazoo	Kalamazoo	201,550	212,378	223,411	5.2% ▲
10	Berrien	Benton Harbor	163,875	171,276	161,378	−5.8% ▼
11	Muskegon	Muskegon	157,426	157,589	158,983	0.9% ▲
12	Ottawa	Holland	128,181	157,174	187,768	19.5% ▲
13	Jackson	Jackson	143,274	151,495	149,756	−1.1% ▼
14	Calhoun	Battle Creek	141,963	141,557	135,982	−3.9% ▼
15	St. Clair	Port Huron	120,175	138,802	145,607	4.9% ▲
16	Monroe	Monroe	118,479	134,659	133,600	−0.8% ▼
17	Bay	Bay City	117,339	119,881	111,723	−6.8% ▼
18	Livingston	Howell	58,967	100,289	115,645	15.3% ▲

== Sports ==
=== Baseball ===
- 1981 Detroit Tigers season – Under manager Sparky Anderson, the Tigers compiled an 84-78 record and finished fourth in the American League East. The team's statistical leaders included Alan Trammell with a .300 batting average, Lance Parrish with 24 home runs, Steve Kemp with 101 RBIs, Jack Morris with 16 wins, and Pat Underwood with a 3.59 earned run average (ERA).

=== American football ===
- 1981 Detroit Lions season – The Lions, under head coach Monte Clark, compiled an 8–8 record and finished second in the NFC Central Division. The team's statistical leaders included Eric Hipple with 2,358 passing yards, Billy Sims with 1,437 rushing yards, Freddie Scott with 1,022 receiving yards, and Eddie Murray with 121 points scored.
- 1981 Michigan Wolverines football team – Under head coach Bo Schembechler, the Wolverines compiled a 9–3 record and were ranked No. 12 in the final AP Poll. The team's statistical leaders included Steve Smith with 1,661 passing yards and 72 points scored, Butch Woolfolk with 1,459 rushing yards, and Anthony Carter with 932 receiving yards.
- 1981 Michigan State Spartans football team – Under head coach Muddy Waters, the Spartans compiled a 5–6 record. The team's statistical leaders included Bryan Clark with 1,521 passing yards, Aaron Roberts with 461 rushing yards, and Daryl Turner with 653 receiving yards.

=== Basketball ===
- 1980–81 Detroit Pistons season – Under head coach Scotty Robertson, the Pistons compiled a 21–61 record and finished sixth in the NBA's Central Division. The team's statistical leaders included Phil Hubbard with 1,161 points and 586 rebounds and Ron Lee with 362 assists.
- 1980–81 Michigan Wolverines men's basketball team – Under head coach Bill Frieder, the Wolverines compiled a 19–11 record. The team's statistical leaders include Mike McGee with 732 points, Thad Garner with 167 rebounds, and John Johnson with 105 assists.
- 1980–81 Michigan State Spartans men's basketball team – Under head coach Jud Heathcote, the Spartans compiled a 13–14 record. The Spartans' statistical leaders included Jay Vincent with 609 points and 229 rebounds and Kevin Smith with 130 assists.
- 1980–81 Detroit Titans men's basketball team – The Titans compiled a 9–18 record under head coach Willie McCarter.

=== Ice hockey ===
- 1980–81 Detroit Red Wings season – Under head coaches Ted Lindsay and Wayne Maxner, the Red Wings compiled a 19–43–18 record and finished fifth in the National Hockey League's Norris Division. The team's statistical leaders included John Ogrodnick with 35 goals and 73 points and Dale McCourt with 56 assists and 86 points. The team's regular goaltenders were Gilles Gilbert and Larry Lozinski.

== Births ==
- January 20 - Jason Richardson, basketball player, in Saginaw
- February 17 - T. J. Duckett, football running back, in Kalamazoo
- March 13 - Mozella, singer and songwriter, in Detroit
- March 25 - Daniel Vosovic, fashion designer, in Grand Rapids
- April 20 - Tom Leonard, 73rd Speaker of the Michigan House of Representatives (2017-2019)
- May 23 - Charles Rogers, football wide receiver, in Saginaw
- July 28 - Willie Green, basketball player and coach, in Detroit

== Deaths ==
- February 9 - Bill Haley, rock and roll pioneer and Highland Park native, at age 55 in Texas
- March 20 - Gee Walker, outfielder for Detroit Tigers (1931–37), at age 73 in Jackson, Mississippi
- March 20 - Sonny Red, jazz saxophonist, at age 48 in Detroit
- April 12 - Joe Louis, boxer and heavyweight champion, at age 66 in Nevada
- May 6 - Frank Fitzsimmons, president of the Teamsters 1967-81, at age 72 in San Diego
- October 18 - Bill Muncey, hydroplane racer, at age 52 in Acapulco, Mexico
- October 26 - Bob Ufer, track and field athlete and radio announcer, at age 61 in Ann Arbor
- November 22 - Corrado Parducci, architectural sculptor, at age 81

=== Gallery of 1981 deaths ===
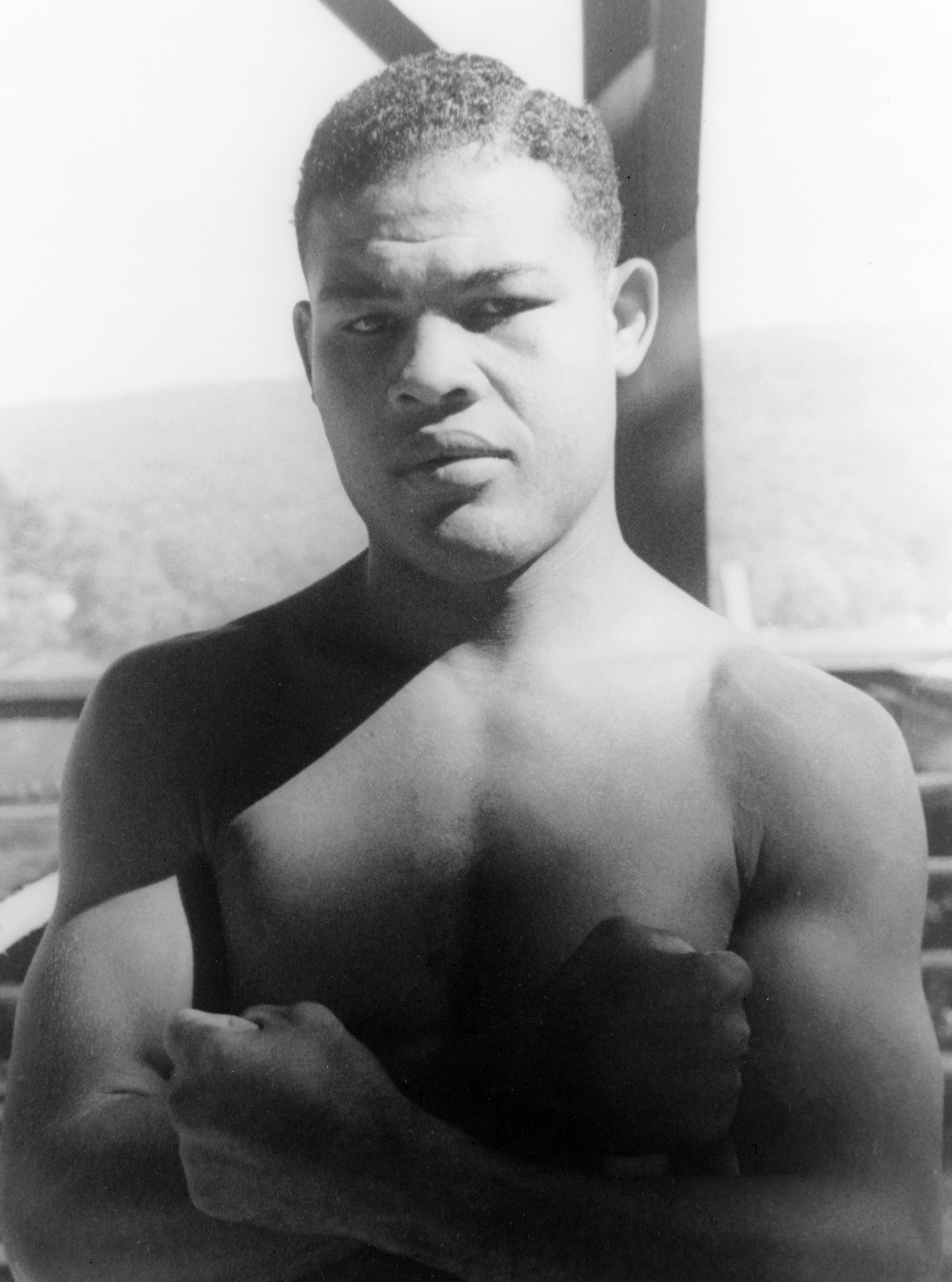
Joe Louis

== See also ==
- History of Michigan
- History of Detroit
