= 1979 in Michigan =

- Decades: 1950s; 1960s; 1970s; 1980s; 1990s
- See also: History of Michigan; Historical outline of Michigan; List of years in Michigan; 1979 in the United States

Events from the year 1979 in Michigan.

The Associated Press (AP) selected the top Michigan news stories of 1979 as follows:

1. Chrysler Corporation's financial troubles, including a loss for 1979 estimated to exceed $1 billion, a federal loan guarantee program of $1.5 billion approved at the end of the year, and $462 million in concessions from workers;
2. A 22% decline in U.S. automobile sales and the indefinite layoffs of 141,000 workers in the automobile industry;
3. New collective bargaining agreements between the United Auto Workers and the Big Three reached without a strike for the first time since prior to 1964;
4. (tie) Teacher strikes in Detroit and other communities that impacted hundreds of thousands of students in the fall;
5. (tie) The selection of Detroit as the host city for the 1980 Republican National Convention;
6. Toxic chemical dumping sites in need of cleanup;
7. An $18 million budget deficit for Wayne County;
8. Blockades by striking independent truck drivers during the summer;
9. A court dispute over Indian fishing rights, including the use of gill nets, in Lake Michigan; and
10. A record-setting $450,000 fine imposed the Nuclear Regulatory Commission on Consumers Power for safety violations at the Palisades Nuclear Generating Station on Lake Michigan.

== Office holders ==
=== State office holders ===
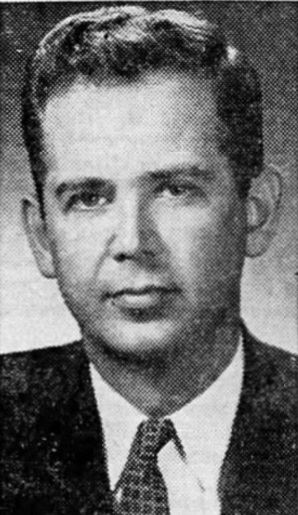
Gov. Milliken

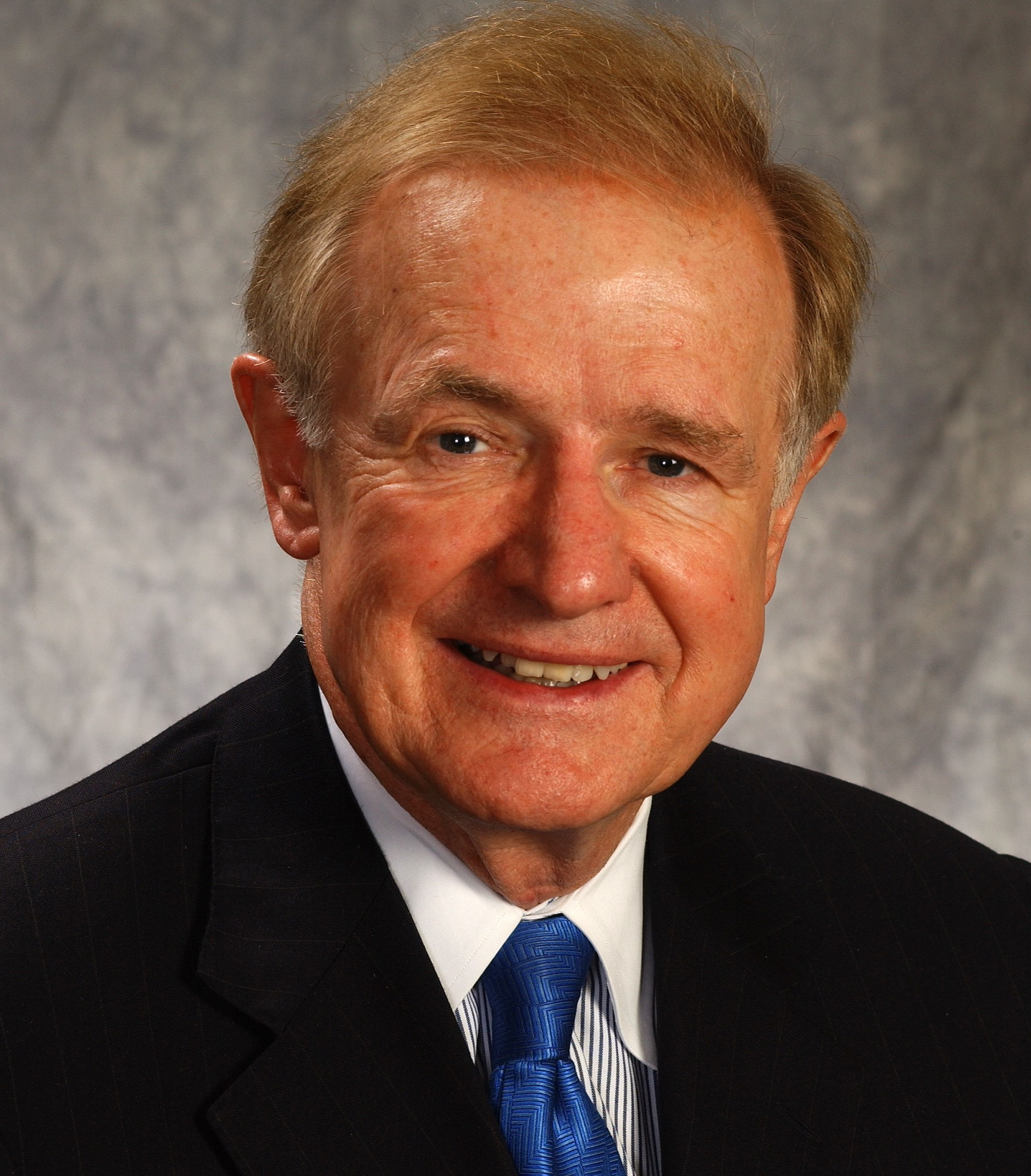
Sen. Riegle

- Governor of Michigan: William Milliken (Republican)
- Lieutenant Governor of Michigan: James Damman (Republican)/James H. Brickley (Republican)
- Michigan Attorney General: Frank J. Kelley (Democrat)
- Michigan Secretary of State: Richard H. Austin (Democrat)
- Speaker of the Michigan House of Representatives: Bobby Crim (Democrat)
- Majority Leader of the Michigan Senate: William Faust (Democrat)
- Chief Justice, Michigan Supreme Court: Thomas G. Kavanagh/Mary S. Coleman

=== Mayors of major cities ===
- Mayor of Detroit: Coleman Young
- Mayor of Grand Rapids: Abe L. Drasin
- Mayor of Warren, Michigan: Ted Bates
- Mayor of Sterling Heights, Michigan: Anthony Dobry
- Mayor of Flint: James W. Rutherford
- Mayor of Dearborn: John O'Reilly, Sr.
- Mayor of Lansing: Gerald W. Graves
- Mayor of Ann Arbor: Louis Belcher (Republican)
- Mayor of Saginaw: Joe Stephens/Vacant/Paul P. Prudhomme

=== Federal office holders ===
- United States Senator from Michigan: Donald W. Riegle Jr. (Democrat)
- United States Senator from Michigan: Carl Levin (Democrat)
- United States Representative, District 1: John Conyers (Democrat)
- United States Representative, District 2: Carl Pursell (Republican)
- United States Representative, District 3: Howard Wolpe (Democrat)
- United States Representative, District 4: David Stockman (Republican)
- United States Representative, District 5: Harold S. Sawyer (Republican)
- United States Representative, District 6: Bob Carr (Democrat)
- United States Representative, District 7: Dale Kildee (Democrat)
- United States Representative, District 8: J. Bob Traxler (Democrat)
- United States Representative, District 9: Guy Vander Jagt (Republican)
- United States Representative, District 10: Donald J. Albosta (Democrat)
- United States Representative, District 11: Robert William Davis (Republican)
- United States Representative, District 12: David Bonior (Democrat)
- United States Representative, District 13: Charles Diggs (Democrat)
- United States Representative, District 14: Lucien N. Nedzi (Democrat)
- United States Representative, District 15: William D. Ford (Democrat)
- United States Representative, District 16: John Dingell (Democrat)
- United States Representative, District 17: William M. Brodhead (Democrat)
- United States Representative, District 18: James Blanchard (Democrat)
- United States Representative, District 19: William Broomfield (Republican)

== Population ==
In the 1970 United States census, Michigan was recorded as having a population of 8,875,083 persons, ranking as the seventh most populous state in the country. By 1980, the state's population had grown 4.4% to 9,262,078 persons.

=== Cities ===
The following is a list of cities in Michigan with a population of at least 70,000 based on 1970 U.S. Census data. Historic census data from 1960 and 1980 is included to reflect trends in population increases or decreases. Cities that are part of the Detroit metropolitan area are shaded in tan.

1970 Rank	City	County	1960 Pop.	1970 Pop.	1980 Pop.	Change 1970-80
1	Detroit	Wayne	1,670,144	1,514,063	1,203,368	−20.5% ▼
2	Grand Rapids	Kent	177,313	197,649	181,843	−8.0% ▼
3	Flint	Genesee	196,940	193,317	159,611	−17.4% ▼
4	Warren	Macomb	89,246	179,260	161,134	−10.1% ▼
5	Lansing	Ingham	107,807	131,403	130,414	−0.8% ▼
6	Livonia	Wayne	66,702	110,109	104,814	−4.8% ▼
7	Dearborn	Wayne	112,007	104,199	90,660	−13.0% ▼
8	Ann Arbor	Washtenaw	67,340	100,035	107,969	7.9% ▲
9	Saginaw	Saginaw	98,265	91,849	77,508	−15.6% ▼
10	St. Clair Shores	Macomb	76,657	88,093	76,210	−13.5% ▼
11	Westland	Wayne	60,743	86,749	84,603	−2.5% ▼
12	Royal Oak	Oakland	80,612	86,238	70,893	−17.8% ▼
13	Kalamazoo	Kalamazoo	82,089	85,555	79,722	−6.8% ▼
14	Pontiac	Oakland	82,233	85,279	76,715	−10.0% ▼
15	Dearborn Heights	Wayne	61,118	80,069	67,706	−15.4% ▼
16	Taylor	Wayne	na	70,020	77,568	10.8% ▲

=== Counties ===
The following is a list of counties in Michigan with populations of at least 120,000 based on 1970 U.S. Census data. Historic census data from 1960 and 1980 are included to reflect trends in population increases or decreases. Counties that are part of the Detroit metropolitan area are shaded in tan.

1970 Rank	County	Largest city	1960 Pop.	1970 Pop.	1980 Pop.	Change 1970-80
1	Wayne	Detroit	2,666,297	2,666,751	2,337,891	−12.3% ▼
2	Oakland	Pontiac	690,259	907,871	1,011,793	11.4% ▲
3	Macomb	Warren	405,804	625,309	694,600	11.1% ▲
4	Genesee	Flint	374,313	444,341	450,449	1.4% ▲
5	Kent	Grand Rapids	363,187	411,044	444,506	8.1% ▲
6	Ingham	Lansing	211,296	261,039	275,520	5.5% ▲
7	Washtenaw	Ann Arbor	172,440	234,103	264,748	13.1% ▲
8	Saginaw	Saginaw	190,752	219,743	228,059	3.8% ▲
9	Kalamazoo	Kalamazoo	169,712	201,550	212,378	5.4% ▲
10	Berrien	Benton Harbor	149,865	163,875	171,276	4.5% ▲
11	Muskegon	Muskegon	129,943	157,426	157,589	0.1% ▲
12	Jackson	Jackson	131,994	143,274	151,495	5.7% ▲
13	Calhoun	Battle Creek	138,858	141,963	141,557	−0.3% ▼
14	Ottawa	Holland	98,719	128,181	157,174	22.6% ▲
15	St. Clair	Port Huron	107,201	120,175	138,802	15.5% ▲
16	Monroe	Monroe	101,120	118,479	134,659	13.7% ▲
17	Bay	Bay City	107,042	117,339	119,881	2.2% ▲

== Sports ==
=== Baseball ===
- 1979 Detroit Tigers season – Under managers Les Moss, Dick Tracewski, and Sparky Anderson, the Tigers compiled an 85–76 record and finished fifth in the American League East. The team's statistical leaders included Steve Kemp with a .318 batting average, 26 home runs, and 105 RBIs, Jack Morris with 17 wins, and Aurelio Lopez with a 2.41 earned run average (ERA).

=== American football ===
- 1979 Detroit Lions season – The Lions, under head coach Monte Clark, compiled a 2–14 record. The team's statistical leaders included Jeff Komlo with 2,238 passing yards, Dexter Bussey with 625 rushing yards, Freddie Scott with 929 receiving yards, and Benny Ricardo with 55 points scored.
- 1979 Michigan Wolverines football team – Under head coach Bo Schembechler, the Wolverines compiled an 8–4 record and were ranked No. 18 in the final AP Poll. The team's statistical leaders included John Wangler with 1,431 passing yards, Butch Woolfolk with 990 rushing yards and 78 points scored, and Doug Marsh with 612 receiving yards.
- 1979 Michigan State Spartans football team – Under head coach Darryl Rogers, the Spartans compiled a 5–6 record. The team's statistical leaders included Bryan Clark with 800 passing yards, Steve Smith with 972 rushing yards, and Eugene Byrd with 559 receiving yards.

=== Basketball ===
- 1978–79 Detroit Pistons season – Under head coach Dick Vitale, the Pistons compiled a 30–52 record and finished fourth in the NBA's Central Division. The team's statistical leaders included M. L. Carr with 1,497 points, Leon Douglas with 664 rebounds and Kevin Porter with 1,099 assists. The team moved from Cobo Hall to the Pontiac Silverdome starting with the 1978–79 season.
- 1978–79 Michigan State Spartans men's basketball team – Under head coach Jud Heathcote, the Spartans compiled a 26–7 record and won both the Big Ten Conference championship and the 1979 NCAA Division I Basketball Tournament in a finals matching Magic Johnson's Spartans against Larry Byrd's Indiana State Sycamores. The Spartans' statistical leaders included Greg Kelser with 602 points and 278 rebounds and Magic Johnson with 269 assists.
- 1978–79 Detroit Titans men's basketball team – The Titans compiled a 22–6 record under head coach Smokey Gaines.
- 1978–79 Michigan Wolverines men's basketball team – Under head coach Johnny Orr, the Wolverines compiled a 15–12 record. The team's statistical leaders include Mike McGee with 511 points, Phil Hubbard with 238 rebounds, and Marty Bodnar with 61 assists.

=== Ice hockey ===
- 1978–79 Detroit Red Wings season – Under head coach Bobby Kromm, the Red Wings compiled a 23–41–16 record and finished fifth in the National Hockey League's Norris Division. The team's statistical leaders included Vaclav Nedomansky with 38 goals and 73 points and Reed Larson with 49 assists. The team's regular goaltenders were Jim Rutherford and Rogie Vachon.

== Music ==
Albums and singles by Michigan artists or centered on Michigan topics that were released or became hits in 1979 include the following:

- "My Sharona", written by Oak Park native Doug Fieger, was released in April 1979 and became the year's No. 1 hit as reflected on the Billboard Year-End Hot 100 singles of 1979.
- "Old Time Rock and Roll" by Detroit's Bob Seger was released as a single in March 1979. It has since become a standard in popular music and was ranked number two on the Amusement & Music Operators Association's survey of the Top 40 Jukebox Singles of All Time in 1996.
- "We've Got Tonite" by Bob Seger was released in 1978 and became a hit in 1979; it reached No. 13 on the Billboard Hot 100 and was ranked No. 94 on the Billboard Year-End Hot 100 singles of 1979.
- "Heartache Tonight", co-written by Detroit natives Glenn Frey, Bob Seger and JD Souther (along with Don Henley), was released by The Eagles in September 1979 and reached No. 1 on the Billboard Hot 100. Glenn Frey sang the lead vocals.
- "Stumblin' In" by Detroit native Suzi Quatro (duet with Chris Norman) was released in the US in January 1979 and reached No. 4 on the Billboard Hot 100.
- Journey Through "The Secret Life of Plants", a studio album by Detroit native Stevie Wonder, was released in October. The album included the single "Send One Your Love"; it reached No. 1 on the Adult Contemporary chart and No. 4 on the Billboard Hot 100.
- The Boss, a studio album by Detroit native Diana Ross, was released in May and was certified gold. The single of the same name was ranked No. 97 on the Billboard Year-End Hot 100 singles of 1979.
- "How You Gonna See Me Now", a single by Detroit native Alice Cooper, was released in late 1978, reached No. 12 on the Billboard Hot 100 and was ranked No. 87 on the Billboard Year-End Hot 100 singles of 1979.
- State of Shock, the fifth solo studio album by Redford native Ted Nugent, was released in May and reached No. 18 on the Billboard album chart.
- New Values, a studio album by Michigan native Iggy Pop, was released in April 1979. The album included the song "Don't Look Down", later recorded by David Bowie.
- La Diva, an album by Aretha Franklin, was released in September 1979 and sold less than 75,000 copies in the US -- the poorest selling album in Franklin's Atlantic catalogue.

== Births ==
- January 31 - Robert Saleh, American football coach currently defensive coordinator of the San Francisco 49ers, in Dearborn, Michigan
- July 20 - Ed Swiderski, winner on season 5 of the reality TV show The Bachelorette, in Monroe, Michigan
- November 28 - Daniel Henney, actor (My Father, Shanghai Calling, Criminal Minds: Beyond Borders), in Carson City, Michigan
- December 28 - Marvin Winans Jr., singer and producer, in Detroit
- December 30 - Tommy Clufetos, drummer for Ted Nugent, Alice Cooper, Rob Zombie, Ozzy Osbourne, and Black Sabbath, in Detroit

=== Gallery of 1979 births ===
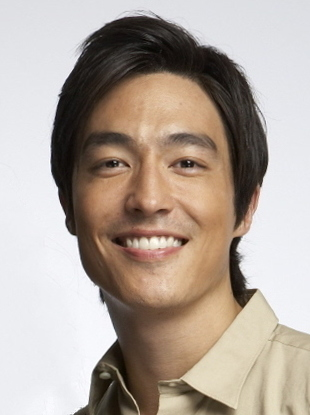
Daniel Henney

== Deaths ==
- September 4 - Turkey Stearnes, Negro leagues player inducted into Baseball Hall of Fame, at age 78 in Detroit
- October 27 - Charles Coughlin, Roman Catholic priest who had up to 30 million listeners to his weekly radio broadcast in the 1930s, at age 88 in Bloomfield Hills, Michigan
- November 23 - Charles E. Potter, U.S. Congressman (1947-1952) and Senator (1952-1959) from Michigan, at age 63 in Washington, D.C.
- November 27 - Jerome Cavanagh, Mayor of Detroit (1962-1970), at age 51 in Lexington, Kentucky

=== Gallery of 1979 deaths ===
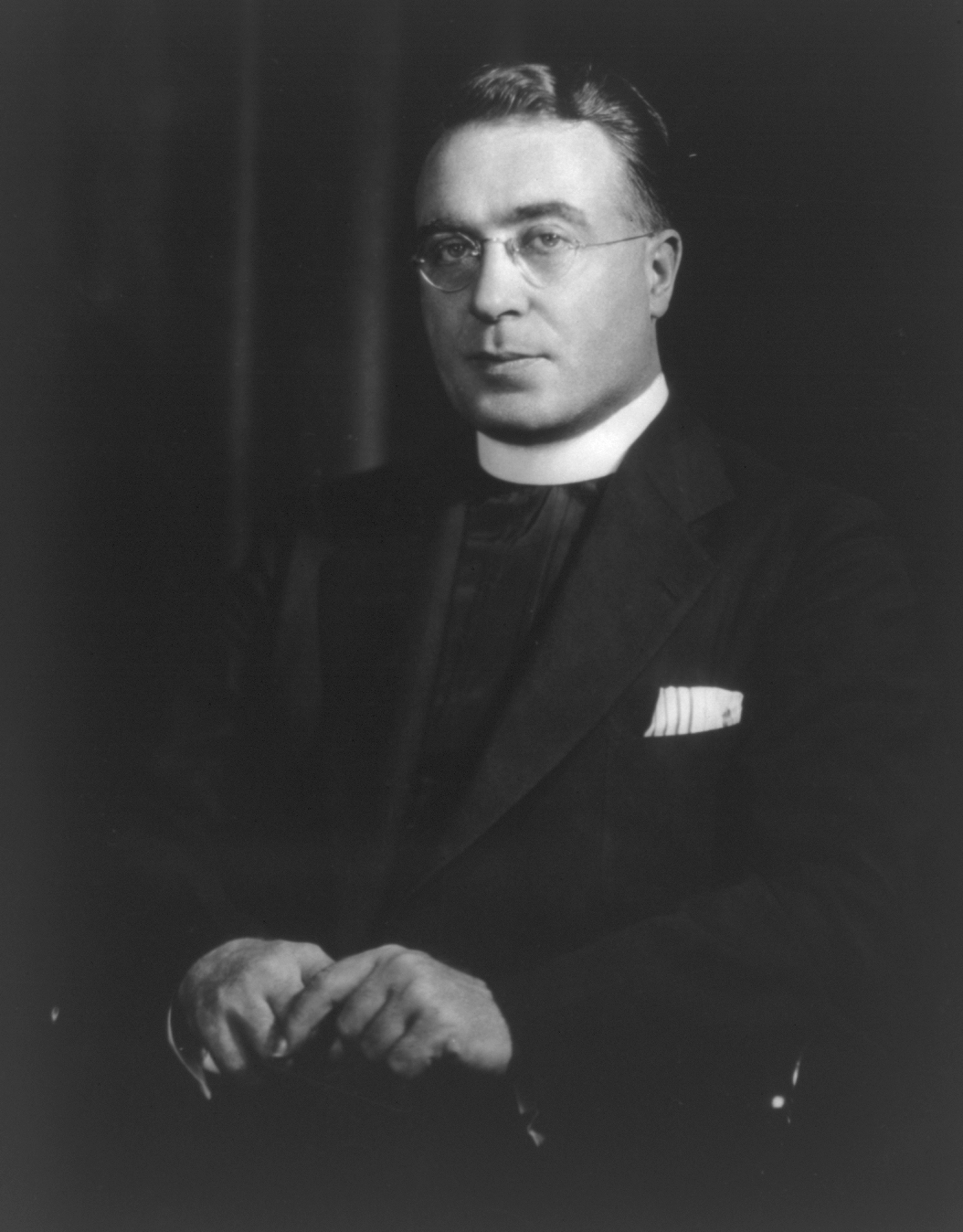
Charles Coughlin

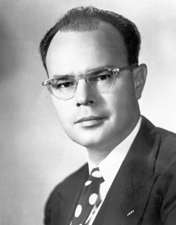
Charles E. Potter

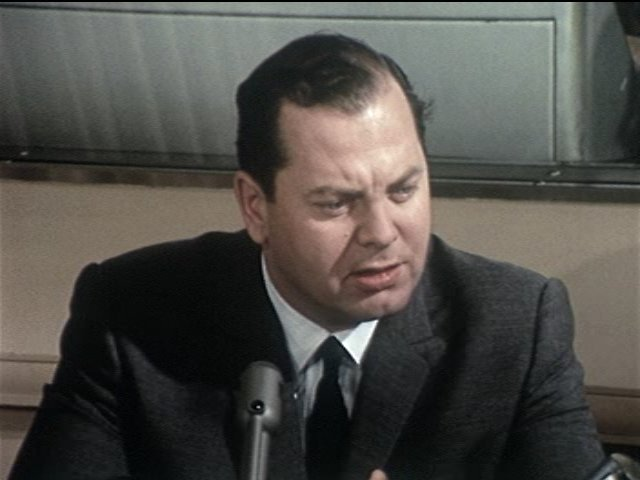
Jerome Cavanagh
