= 1982 in Michigan =

- Decades: 1960s; 1970s; 1980s; 1990s; 2000s
- See also: History of Michigan; Historical outline of Michigan; List of years in Michigan; 1982 in the United States

Events from the year 1982 in Michigan.

The Associated Press (AP) selected the state's top news stories as follows:

1. The election of James Blanchard as Governor, the first Democrat elected to the office in 20 years;
2. Unemployment in Michigan with 732,000 Michiganders out of work and a record unemployment rate of 17.2%;
3. Mass homicides, including the Rock Road massacre, the murder of a five members of the Paulson family near Allendale on March 13, and the murder of Bette Giuliani and her four adopted daughters in St. Clair County on April 7;
4. Four rounds of cuts in the state budget totaling $778 million and resulting from the state's economic tailspin;
5. New contracts between the United Auto Workers and the major automobile manufacturers;
6. A continued slump in sales of American automobiles;
7. Richard Headlee's nomination as the Republican candidate for Governor, defeating Gov. Milliken's chosen successor, James H. Brickley with Headlee losing to Blanchard in the general election as Milliken remained on the sidelines;
8. Cold weather and heavy snow through the winter of 1982;
9. Fraud charges brought by the Canadian government against Amway and four of its executives for allegedly using dummy invoices showing lower values to reduce customs duties paid for goods shipped to Canada;
10. (tie for 10th) The February birth of a baby to a 12-year-old rape victim in Kalamazoo who was denied an abortion after an unsuccessful court battle; and
11. (tie for 10th) Super Bowl XVI between the Cincinnati Bengals and San Francisco 49ers held at the Pontiac Silverdome, the first Super Bowl held in the snow belt.

== Office holders ==
=== State office holders ===
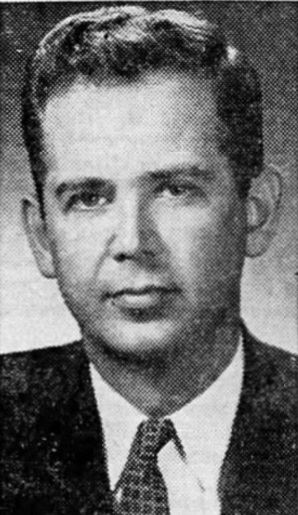
Gov. Milliken

- Governor of Michigan: William Milliken (Republican)
- Lieutenant Governor of Michigan: James H. Brickley (Republican)
- Michigan Attorney General: Frank J. Kelley (Democrat)
- Michigan Secretary of State: Richard H. Austin (Democrat)
- Speaker of the Michigan House of Representatives: Bobby Crim (Democrat)
- Majority Leader of the Michigan Senate: William Faust (Democrat)
- Chief Justice, Michigan Supreme Court: Mary S. Coleman/John W. Fitzgerald

=== Mayors of major cities ===
- Mayor of Detroit: Coleman Young
- Mayor of Grand Rapids: Abe L. Drasin
- Mayor of Warren, Michigan: James R. Randlett
- Mayor of Flint: James W. Rutherford
- Mayor of Dearborn: John O'Reilly, Sr.
- Mayor of Lansing: Terry John McKane
- Mayor of Sterling Heights, Michigan: Jerry Mann
- Mayor of Ann Arbor: Louis Belcher (Republican)
- Mayor of Saginaw: Ronald M. Bushey

=== Federal office holders ===
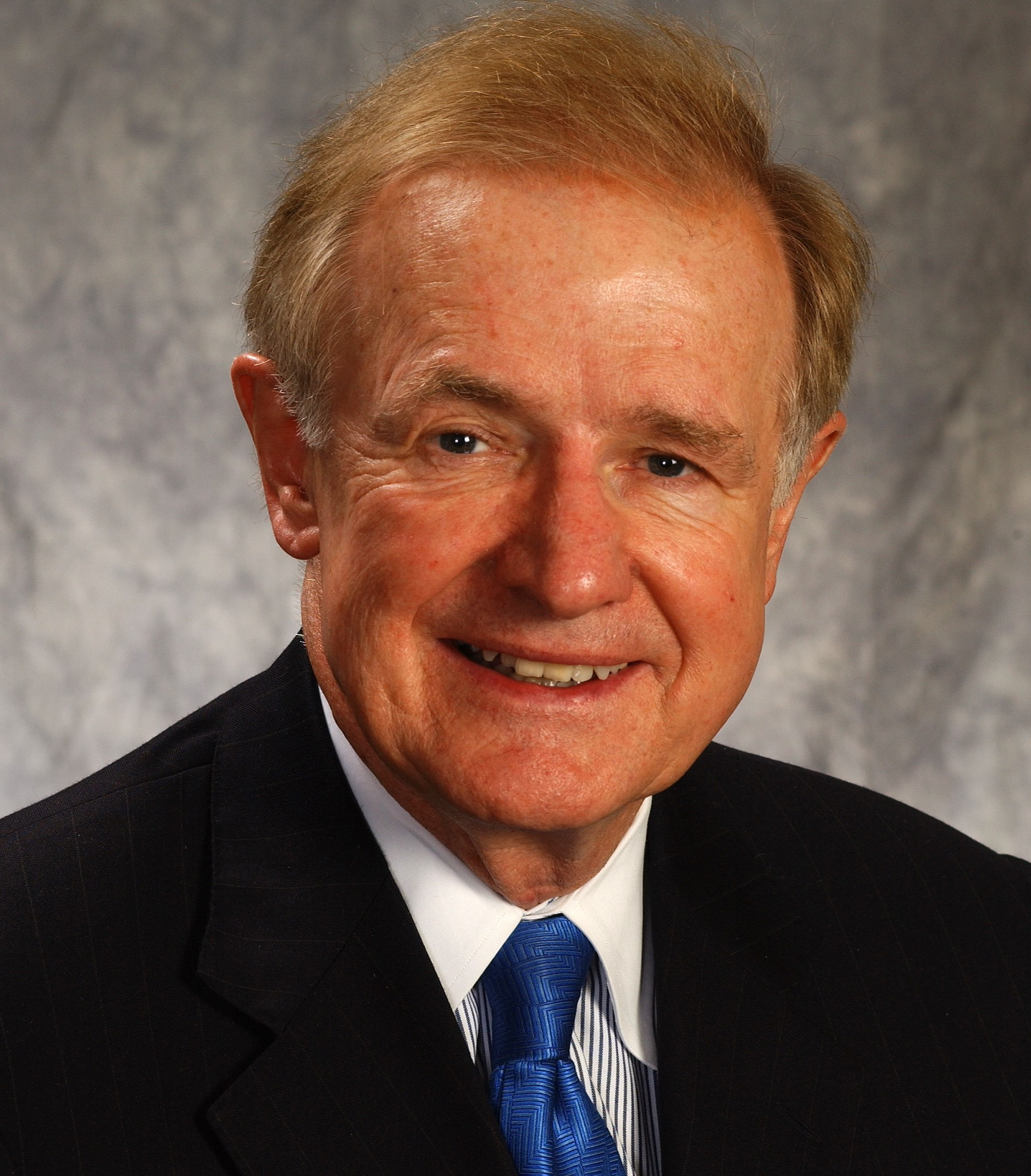
Sen. Riegle

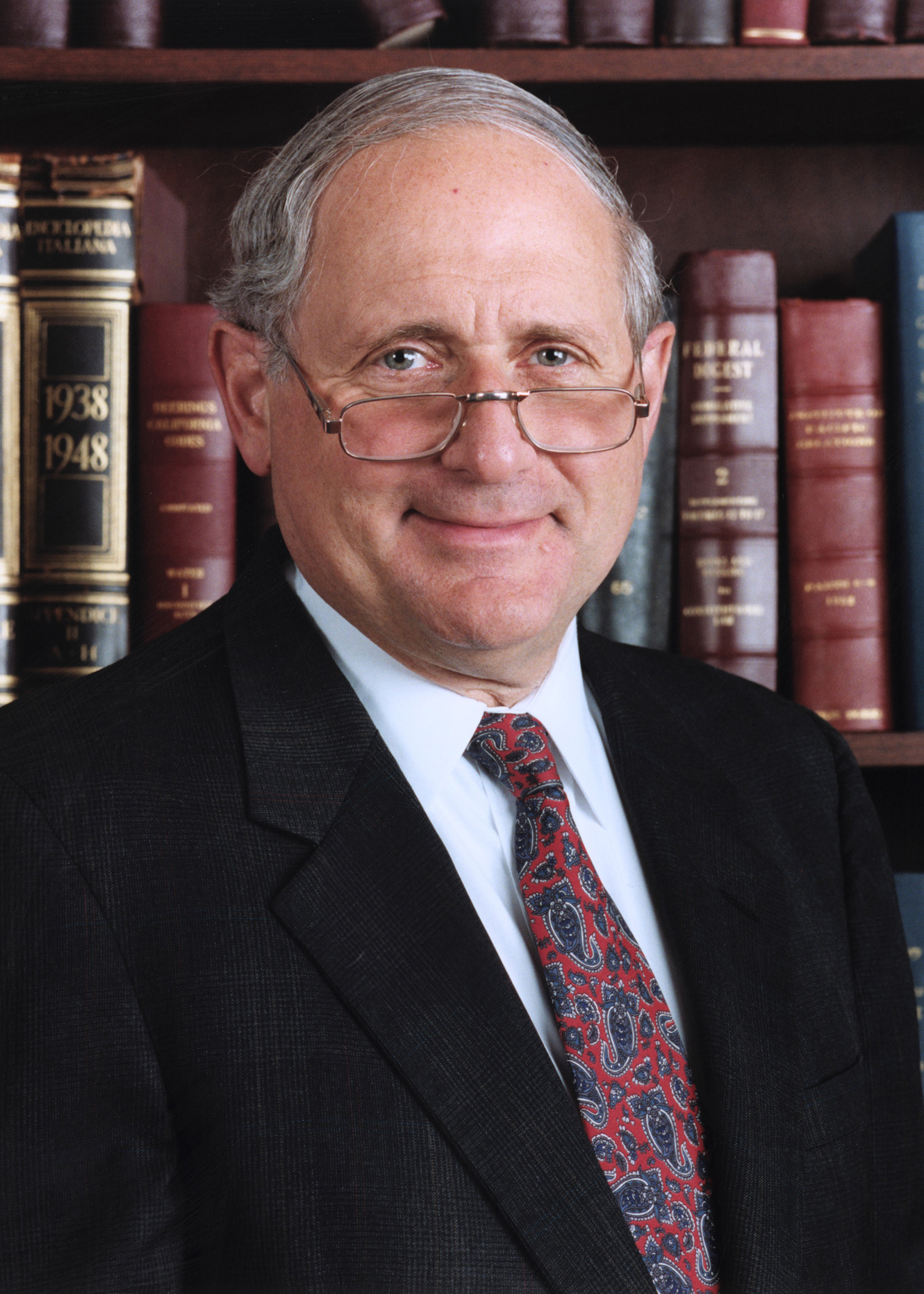
Sen. Levin

- U.S. Senator from Michigan: Donald W. Riegle Jr. (Democrat)
- U.S. Senator from Michigan: Carl Levin (Democrat)
- House District 1: John Conyers (Democrat)
- House District 2: Carl Pursell (Republican)
- House District 3: Howard Wolpe (Republican)
- House District 4: Mark D. Siljander (Republican)
- House District 5: Harold S. Sawyer (Republican)
- House District 6: Jim Dunn (Republican)
- House District 7: Dale Kildee (Democrat)
- House District 8: J. Bob Traxler (Democrat)
- House District 9: Guy Vander Jagt (Republican)
- House District 10: Donald J. Albosta (Democrat)
- House District 11: Robert William Davis (Republican)
- House District 12: David Bonior (Democrat)
- House District 13: George Crockett Jr. (Democrat)
- House District 14: Dennis M. Hertel (Democrat)
- House District 15: William D. Ford (Democrat)
- House District 16: John Dingell (Democrat)
- House District 17: William M. Brodhead (Democrat)
- House District 18: James Blanchard (Democrat)
- House District 19: William Broomfield (Republican)

== Population ==
In the 1980 United States census, Michigan was recorded as having a population of 9,259,000 persons, ranking as the eighth most populous state in the country. By 1990, the state's population had grown only marginally by 0.4% to 9,259,000 persons.

=== Cities ===
The following is a list of cities in Michigan with a population of at least 50,000 based on 1980 U.S. Census data. Historic census data from 1970 and 1990 is included to reflect trends in population increases or decreases. Cities that are part of the Detroit metropolitan area are shaded in tan.

1980 Rank	City	County	1970 Pop.	1980 Pop.	1990 Pop.	Change 1980-90
1	Detroit	Wayne	1,514,063	1,203,368	1,027,974	−14.6% ▼
2	Grand Rapids	Kent	197,649	181,843	189,126	4.0% ▲
3	Warren	Macomb	179,260	161,134	144,864	−10.1% ▼
4	Flint	Genesee	193,317	159,611	140,761	−11.8% ▼
5	Lansing	Ingham	131,403	130,414	127,321	−2.4% ▼
6	Sterling Heights	Macomb	61,365	108,999	117,810	8.1% ▲
7	Ann Arbor	Washtenaw	100,035	107,969	109,592	1.5% ▲
8	Livonia	Wayne	110,109	104,814	100,850	−3.8% ▼
9	Dearborn	Wayne	104,199	90,660	89,286	−1.5%▼
10	Westland	Wayne	86,749	84,603	84,724	0.1% ▲
11	Kalamazoo	Kalamazoo	85,555	79,722	80,277	0.7% ▲
12	Taylor	Wayne	70,020	77,568	70,811	−8.7% ▼
13	Saginaw	Saginaw	91,849	77,508	69,512	−10.3% ▼
14	Pontiac	Oakland	85,279	76,715	71,166	−7.2% ▼
15	St. Clair Shores	Macomb	88,093	76,210	68,107	−10.6% ▼
16	Southfield	Oakland	69,298	75,608	75,745	0.2% ▲
17	Royal Oak	Oakland	86,238	70,893	65,410	−7.7% ▼
18	Dearborn Heights	Wayne	80,069	67,706	60,838	−10.1% ▼
19	Troy	Oakland	39,419	67,102	72,884	8.6% ▲
20	Wyoming	Kent	56,560	59,616	63,891	7.2% ▲
21	Farmington Hills	Oakland	--	58,056	74,611	28.5% ▲
22	Roseville	Macomb	60,529	54,311	51,412	−5.3% ▼
23	East Lansing	Ingham	47,540	51,392	50,677	−1.4% ▼

=== Counties ===
The following is a list of counties in Michigan with populations of at least 100,000 based on 1980 U.S. Census data. Historic census data from 1970 and 1990 are included to reflect trends in population increases or decreases. Counties that are part of the Detroit metropolitan area are shaded in tan.

1980 Rank	County	Largest city	1970 Pop.	1980 Pop.	1990 Pop.	Change 1980-90
1	Wayne	Detroit	2,666,751	2,337,891	2,111,687	−9.7% ▼
2	Oakland	Pontiac	907,871	1,011,793	1,083,592	7.1% ▲
3	Macomb	Warren	625,309	694,600	717,400	3.3% ▲
4	Genesee	Flint	444,341	450,449	430,459	−4.4% ▼
5	Kent	Grand Rapids	411,044	444,506	500,631	12.6% ▲
6	Ingham	Lansing	261,039	275,520	281,912	2.3% ▲
7	Washtenaw	Ann Arbor	234,103	264,748	282,937	6.9% ▲
8	Saginaw	Saginaw	219,743	228,059	211,946	−7.1% ▼
9	Kalamazoo	Kalamazoo	201,550	212,378	223,411	5.2% ▲
10	Berrien	Benton Harbor	163,875	171,276	161,378	−5.8% ▼
11	Muskegon	Muskegon	157,426	157,589	158,983	0.9% ▲
12	Ottawa	Holland	128,181	157,174	187,768	19.5% ▲
13	Jackson	Jackson	143,274	151,495	149,756	−1.1% ▼
14	Calhoun	Battle Creek	141,963	141,557	135,982	−3.9% ▼
15	St. Clair	Port Huron	120,175	138,802	145,607	4.9% ▲
16	Monroe	Monroe	118,479	134,659	133,600	−0.8% ▼
17	Bay	Bay City	117,339	119,881	111,723	−6.8% ▼
18	Livingston	Howell	58,967	100,289	115,645	15.3% ▲

== Sports ==
=== Baseball ===
- 1982 Detroit Tigers season – Under manager Sparky Anderson, the Tigers compiled an 83–79 record and finished fourth in the American League East. The team's statistical leaders included Larry Herndon with a .292 batting average and 88 RBIs, Lance Parrish with 32 home runs, Jack Morris with 17 wins, and Dan Petry with a 3.22 earned run average (ERA).

=== American football ===
- 1982 Detroit Lions season – The Lions, under head coach Monte Clark, compiled a 4–5 record and finished fourth in the NFC Central Division. The team's statistical leaders included Gary Danielson with 1,343 passing yards, Billy Sims with 639 rushing yards and 342 receiving yards, and Eddie Murray with 49 points scored.
- 1982 Michigan Wolverines football team – Under head coach Bo Schembechler, the Wolverines compiled an 8–4 record. The team's statistical leaders included Steve Smith with 1,735 passing yards and 72 points scored, Lawrence Ricks with 1,388 rushing yards, and Anthony Carter with 844 receiving yards.

=== Basketball ===
- 1981–82 Detroit Pistons season – Under head coach Scotty Robertson, the Pistons compiled a 39–43 record and finished third in the NBA's Central Division. The team's statistical leaders included Kelly Tripucka with 1,772 points, Kent Benson with 653 rebounds and Isiah Thomas with 565 assists.

=== Ice hockey ===
- 1981–82 Detroit Red Wings season – Under head coaches Wayne Maxner and Billy Dea, the Red Wings compiled a 21–47–12 record and finished sixth in the National Hockey League's Norris Division. The team's statistical leaders included Mark Osborne with 41 assists and 67 points and John Ogrodnick with 28 goals. The team's regular goaltenders were Bob Sauve, Gilles Gilbert and Corrado Micalef.

== Music and culture ==
Michigan acts performed five of the songs ranked on the Billboard Year-End Hot 100 singles of 1982, as follows:

- "Ebony and Ivory" by Stevie Wonder and Paul McCartney (No. 4);
- "That Girl" by Stevie Wonder (No. 43);
- "Why Do Fools Fall in Love" by Diana Ross (No. 54);
- "Mirror Mirror" by Diana Ross (No. 86); and
- "Do I Do by Stevie Wonder (No. 95)

Notable albums released in 1982 by Michigan acts included the following:

- Stevie Wonder's Original Musiquarium I, an album by Stevie Wonder, was released in May 1982. It reached No. 4 on the Billboard album chart.
- The Distance, an album by Bob Seger, was released in December 1982. It reached No. 5 on the Billboard album chart. The single "Shame on the Moon" reached No. 1 on the adult contemporary chart and No. 2 on the Billboard Hot 100.
- Silk Electric, an album by Diana Ross, was released in September 1982.
- Jump to It, an album released by Aretha Franklin, was released in July 1982.
- Zombie Birdhouse, an album by Iggy Pop, was released in September 1982.
- Nugent, an album by Ted Nugent, was released in August 1982.
- Yes It's You Lady, an album by Smokey Robinson, was released.

In October 1982, Madonna's first single "Everybody" was released. It reached No. 13 on the Billboard dance chart.

== Chronology of events ==
=== January ===
- January 24 - Super Bowl played at the Pontiac Silverdome

== Births ==
- September 25 - Garlin Gilchrist, 64th Lieutenant Governor of Michigan, in Detroit

=== Gallery of 1982 births ===
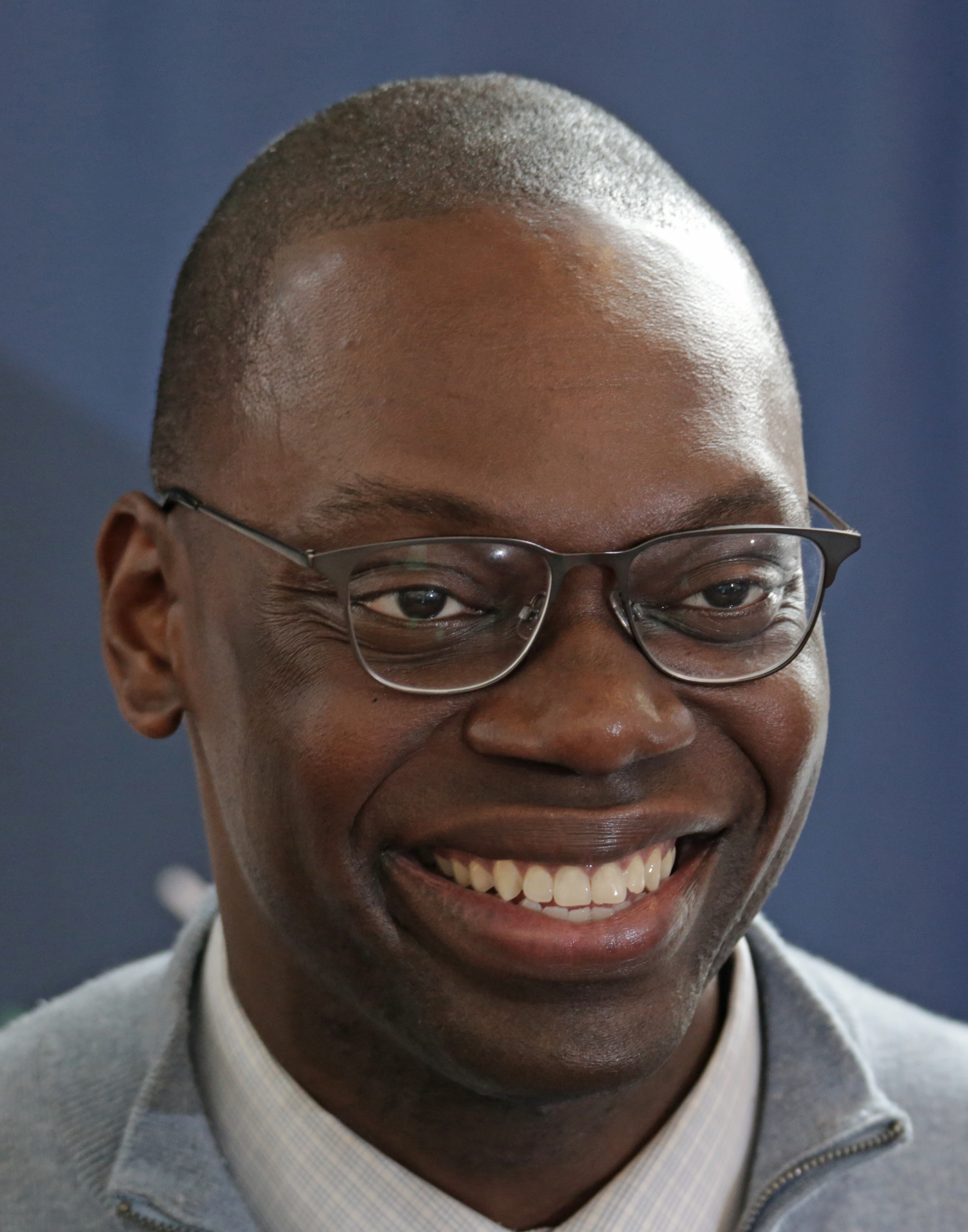
Garlin Gilchrist

== Deaths ==
- March 10 - Charles N. Agree, Detroit architect, at age 84
- August 19 - Fritz Crisler, University of Michigan football coach (1938-1947) and athletic director (1941-1968), at age 83 in Ann Arbor, Michigan
- November 3 - Ray Fisher, Michigan Wolverines baseball coach (1920-1958), at age 95 in Ann Arbor
- November 23 - Benny Friedman, Michigan Wolverines football quarterback (1924-1926) and Pro and College Football Hall of Fame inductee, at age 77 in New York City
- December 16 - Orville L. Hubbard, Mayor of Dearborn (1942-1978) known as the most outspoken segregationist north of the Mason-Dixon line, at age 79
- December 17 - Homer S. Ferguson, U.S. Senator from Michigan (1943-1955), at age 93 in Grosse Pointe, Michigan

=== Gallery of 1982 deaths ===
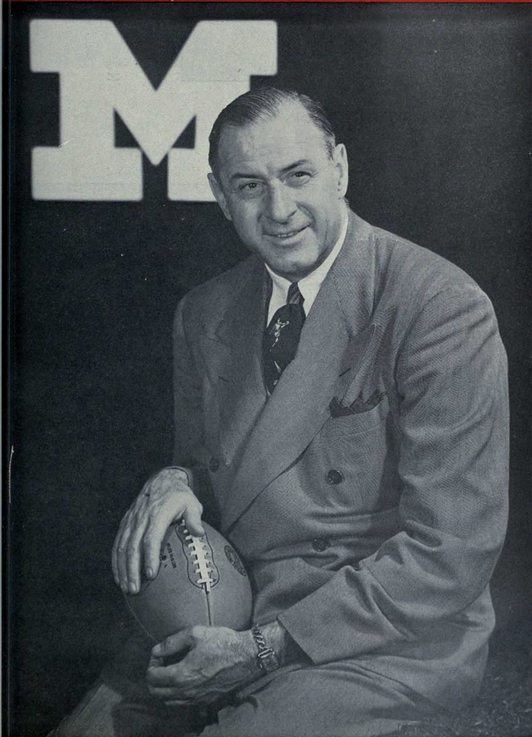
Fritz Crisler

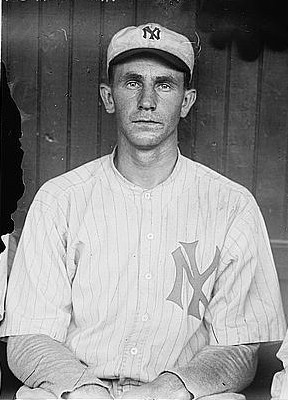
Ray Fisher

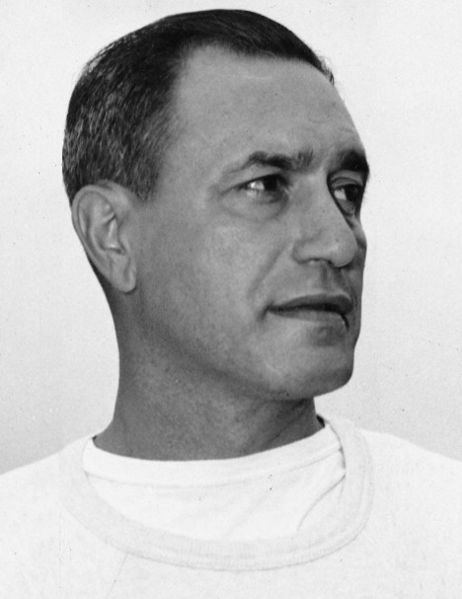
Benny Friedman

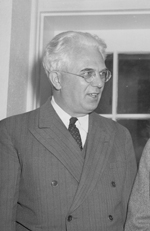
Homer S. Ferguson

== See also ==
- History of Michigan
- History of Detroit
