= 1983 in Michigan =

- Decades: 1960s; 1970s; 1980s; 1990s; 2000s
- See also: History of Michigan; Historical outline of Michigan; List of years in Michigan; 1983 in the United States

Events from the year 1983 in Michigan.

The Associated Press (AP) selected the state's top news stories as follows:

1. A 38% increase in Michigan's income tax led to recall campaigns against state legislators;
2. Dioxins were discovered in Michigan's waterways and fish;
3. Chrysler Corporation returned to financial health;
4. Agnes Mary Mansour, a Roman Catholic nun and director of the Michigan Department of Social Services, quit her order in defiance of a directive from the Vatican that she quit her government job which required her to oversee the use of public funds for abortions;
5. Toxic waste near Swartz Creek, Michigan, required evacuation of locals pending cleanup;
6. The case of Judy Stiver triggers a controversy over her surrogate mother arrangements;
7. Amway and a Canadian subsidiary pled guilty to fraud charges brought by the Canadian government for allegedly using dummy invoices showing lower values to reduce customs duties paid for goods shipped to Canada;
8. In continuing fallout from the Michigan PBB contamination scandal, a bankruptcy court approved the reorganization of the Farm Services Bureau;
9. (tie) Construction began on the Project ELF military antenna; and
10. (tie) The racially motivated Murder of Vincent Chin, a Chinese American, as a result of being beaten with a baseball bat by a Chrysler plant superintendent Ronald Ebens and his stepson.

== Office holders ==
=== State office holders ===
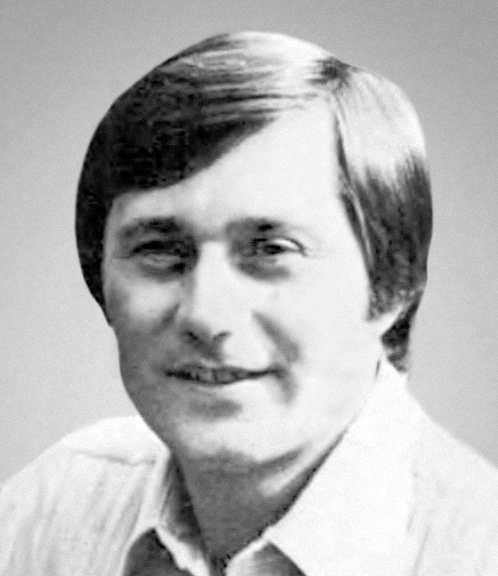
Gov. Blanchard

- Governor of Michigan: James Blanchard (Democrat)
- Lieutenant Governor of Michigan: Martha Griffiths (Democrat)
- Michigan Attorney General: Frank J. Kelley (Democrat)
- Michigan Secretary of State: Richard H. Austin (Democrat)
- Speaker of the Michigan House of Representatives: Gary Owen (Democrat)
- Majority Leader of the Michigan Senate: William Faust (Democrat)
- Chief Justice, Michigan Supreme Court: G. Mennen Williams

=== Mayors of major cities ===
- Mayor of Detroit: Coleman Young
- Mayor of Grand Rapids: Abe L. Drasin
- Mayor of Warren, Michigan: James R. Randlett
- Mayor of Sterling Heights, Michigan: Jerry Mann
- Mayor of Flint: James W. Rutherford/James A. Sharp, Jr.
- Mayor of Dearborn: John O'Reilly, Sr.
- Mayor of Lansing: Terry John McKane
- Mayor of Ann Arbor: Louis Belcher (Republican)
- Mayor of Saginaw: Ronald M. Bushey/Lawrence D. Crawford

=== Federal office holders ===
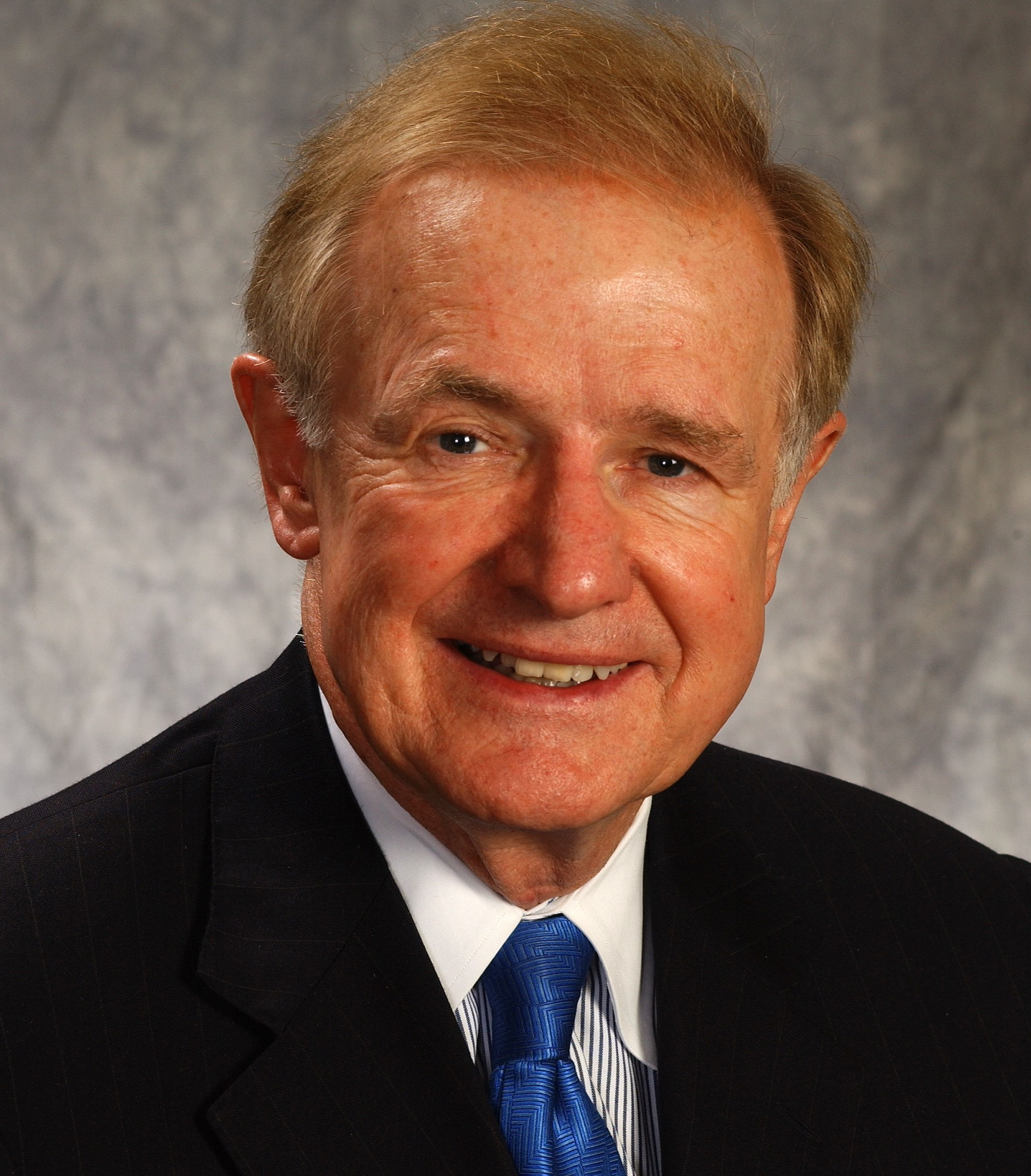
Sen. Riegle

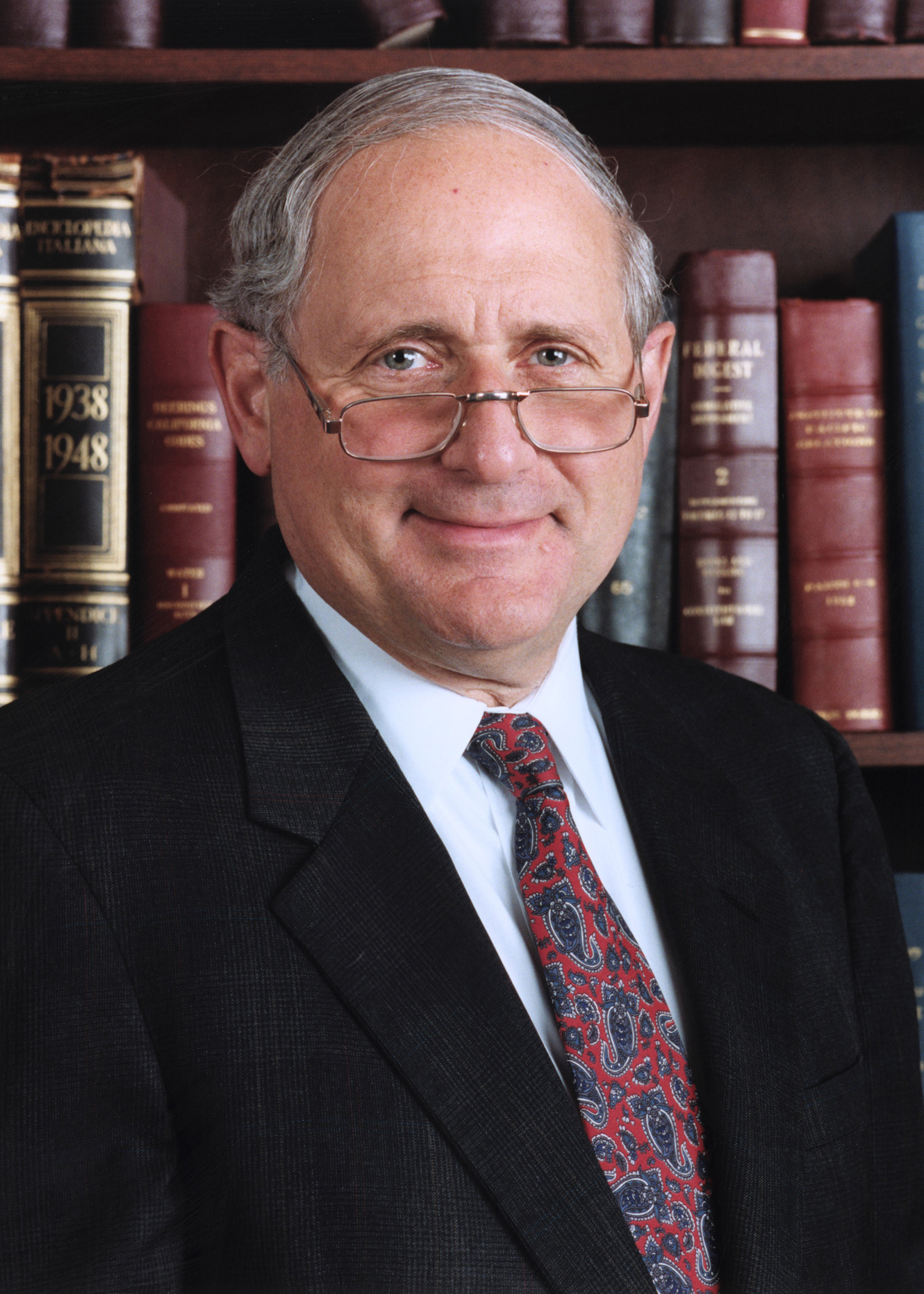
Sen. Levin

- U.S. Senator from Michigan: Donald W. Riegle Jr. (Democrat)
- U.S. Senator from Michigan: Carl Levin (Democrat)
- House District 1: John Conyers (Democrat)
- House District 2: Carl Pursell (Republican)
- House District 3: Howard Wolpe (Republican)
- House District 4: Mark D. Siljander (Republican)
- House District 5: Harold S. Sawyer (Republican)
- House District 6: Bob Dunn (Democrat)
- House District 7: Dale Kildee (Democrat)
- House District 8: J. Bob Traxler (Democrat)
- House District 9: Guy Vander Jagt (Republican)
- House District 10: Donald J. Albosta (Democrat)
- House District 11: Robert William Davis (Republican)
- House District 12: David Bonior (Democrat)
- House District 13: George Crockett Jr. (Democrat)
- House District 14: Dennis M. Hertel (Democrat)
- House District 15: William D. Ford (Democrat)
- House District 16: John Dingell (Democrat)
- House District 17: Sander Levin (Democrat)
- House District 18: William Broomfield (Republican)
- House District 19: Seat lost after 1980 U.S. Census

== Population ==
In the 1980 United States census, Michigan was recorded as having a population of 9,259,000 persons, ranking as the eighth most populous state in the country. By 1990, the state's population had grown only marginally by 0.4% to 9,259,000 persons.

=== Cities ===
The following is a list of cities in Michigan with a population of at least 50,000 based on 1980 U.S. Census data. Historic census data from 1970 and 1990 is included to reflect trends in population increases or decreases. Cities that are part of the Detroit metropolitan area are shaded in tan.

1980 Rank	City	County	1970 Pop.	1980 Pop.	1990 Pop.	Change 1980-90
1	Detroit	Wayne	1,514,063	1,203,368	1,027,974	−14.6% ▼
2	Grand Rapids	Kent	197,649	181,843	189,126	4.0% ▲
3	Warren	Macomb	179,260	161,134	144,864	−10.1% ▼
4	Flint	Genesee	193,317	159,611	140,761	−11.8% ▼
5	Lansing	Ingham	131,403	130,414	127,321	−2.4% ▼
6	Sterling Heights	Macomb	61,365	108,999	117,810	8.1% ▲
7	Ann Arbor	Washtenaw	100,035	107,969	109,592	1.5% ▲
8	Livonia	Wayne	110,109	104,814	100,850	−3.8% ▼
9	Dearborn	Wayne	104,199	90,660	89,286	−1.5%▼
10	Westland	Wayne	86,749	84,603	84,724	0.1% ▲
11	Kalamazoo	Kalamazoo	85,555	79,722	80,277	0.7% ▲
12	Taylor	Wayne	70,020	77,568	70,811	−8.7% ▼
13	Saginaw	Saginaw	91,849	77,508	69,512	−10.3% ▼
14	Pontiac	Oakland	85,279	76,715	71,166	−7.2% ▼
15	St. Clair Shores	Macomb	88,093	76,210	68,107	−10.6% ▼
16	Southfield	Oakland	69,298	75,608	75,745	0.2% ▲
17	Royal Oak	Oakland	86,238	70,893	65,410	−7.7% ▼
18	Dearborn Heights	Wayne	80,069	67,706	60,838	−10.1% ▼
19	Troy	Oakland	39,419	67,102	72,884	8.6% ▲
20	Wyoming	Kent	56,560	59,616	63,891	7.2% ▲
21	Farmington Hills	Oakland	--	58,056	74,611	28.5% ▲
22	Roseville	Macomb	60,529	54,311	51,412	−5.3% ▼
23	East Lansing	Ingham	47,540	51,392	50,677	−1.4% ▼

=== Counties ===
The following is a list of counties in Michigan with populations of at least 100,000 based on 1980 U.S. Census data. Historic census data from 1970 and 1990 are included to reflect trends in population increases or decreases. Counties that are part of the Detroit metropolitan area are shaded in tan.

1980 Rank	County	Largest city	1970 Pop.	1980 Pop.	1990 Pop.	Change 1980-90
1	Wayne	Detroit	2,666,751	2,337,891	2,111,687	−9.7% ▼
2	Oakland	Pontiac	907,871	1,011,793	1,083,592	7.1% ▲
3	Macomb	Warren	625,309	694,600	717,400	3.3% ▲
4	Genesee	Flint	444,341	450,449	430,459	−4.4% ▼
5	Kent	Grand Rapids	411,044	444,506	500,631	12.6% ▲
6	Ingham	Lansing	261,039	275,520	281,912	2.3% ▲
7	Washtenaw	Ann Arbor	234,103	264,748	282,937	6.9% ▲
8	Saginaw	Saginaw	219,743	228,059	211,946	−7.1% ▼
9	Kalamazoo	Kalamazoo	201,550	212,378	223,411	5.2% ▲
10	Berrien	Benton Harbor	163,875	171,276	161,378	−5.8% ▼
11	Muskegon	Muskegon	157,426	157,589	158,983	0.9% ▲
12	Ottawa	Holland	128,181	157,174	187,768	19.5% ▲
13	Jackson	Jackson	143,274	151,495	149,756	−1.1% ▼
14	Calhoun	Battle Creek	141,963	141,557	135,982	−3.9% ▼
15	St. Clair	Port Huron	120,175	138,802	145,607	4.9% ▲
16	Monroe	Monroe	118,479	134,659	133,600	−0.8% ▼
17	Bay	Bay City	117,339	119,881	111,723	−6.8% ▼
18	Livingston	Howell	58,967	100,289	115,645	15.3% ▲

== Sports ==
=== Baseball ===
- 1983 Detroit Tigers season – Under manager Sparky Anderson, the Tigers compiled a 92-70 record and finished second in the American League East. The team's statistical leaders included Lou Whitaker with a .320 batting average, Lance Parrish with 27 home runs and 114 RBIs, Jack Morris with 20 wins, and Aurelio Lopez with a 2.81 earned run average (ERA).

=== American football ===
- 1983 Detroit Lions season – The Lions, under head coach Monte Clark, compiled a 9–7 record and finished first in the NFC Central Division. The team's statistical leaders included Eric Hipple with 2,577 passing yards, Billy Sims with 1,040 rushing yards, Leonard Thompson with 752 receiving yards, and Eddie Murray with 113 points scored.
- 1983 Michigan Wolverines football team – Under head coach Bo Schembechler, the Wolverines compiled a 9–3 record. The team's statistical leaders included Steve Smith with 1,420 passing yards, Rick Rogers with 1,002 rushing yards, Sim Nelson with 494 receiving yards, and Bob Bergeron with 76 points scored.

=== Basketball ===
- 1982–83 Detroit Pistons season – Under head coach Scotty Robertson, the Pistons compiled a 37–45 record and finished third in the NBA's Central Division. The team's statistical leaders included Isiah Thomas with 1,854 points and 634 assists and Bill Laimbeer with 993 rebounds.

=== Ice hockey ===
- 1982–83 Detroit Red Wings season – Under head coach Nick Polano, the Red Wings compiled a 21–44–15 record and finished sixth in the National Hockey League's Norris Division. The team's statistical leaders included John Ogrodnick with 41 assists and 85 points and Reed Larson with 52 assists. The team's regular goaltenders were Corrado Micalef, Greg Stefan, and Gilles Gilbert.

== Music and culture ==
- Madonna, the debut album from Madonna, was released in July 1983. It included the hit singles "Holiday", "Lucky Star", and "Borderline".
- "Old Time Rock and Roll" by Bob Seger, originally released in 1979, appeared in the film Risky Business starring Tom Cruise, released in August 1983, and became a hit.

== Births ==
- January 13 - Alan Webb, runner set US record in mile, in Ann Arbor, Michigan
- January 29 - Tim Gleason, hockey player, in Clawson, Michigan
- February 21 - Braylon Edwards, American football wide receiver, in Detroit
- March 30 - Zach Gowen, one-legged professional wrestler, in Ypsilanti, Michigan
- April 10 - Andrew Dost, musician and singer (Fun), in Cass City, Michigan
- April 16 - Jon Horst, general manager of Milwaukee Bucks, in Sandusky, Michigan
- April 29 - Megan Boone, actress, in Petoskey, Michigan
- June 23 - Brandi Rhodes, model, wrestler, TV personality, in Canton, Michigan
- June 24 Haley Stevens, U.S. House of Representatives, in Rochester Hills, Michigan
- August 14 - Black Milk, rapper and producer, in Detroit
- September 1 - Dan Gheesling, reality TV personality, in Dearborn, Michigan
- September 21 - Greg Jennings, NFL wide receiver (2006-2015), in Kalamazoo, Michigan
- September 23 - Carly Piper, swimmer and Olympic gold medalist, n Grosse Pointe, Michigan
- December 2 - Jana Kramer, country music singer and actress (One Tree Hill), in Rochester Hills, Michigan
- December 14 - Charleston Hughes, defensive end in CFL (2008-22), in Saginaw, Michigan
- December 23 - Chris Conner, hockey player, in Westland, Michigan

=== Gallery of 1983 births ===
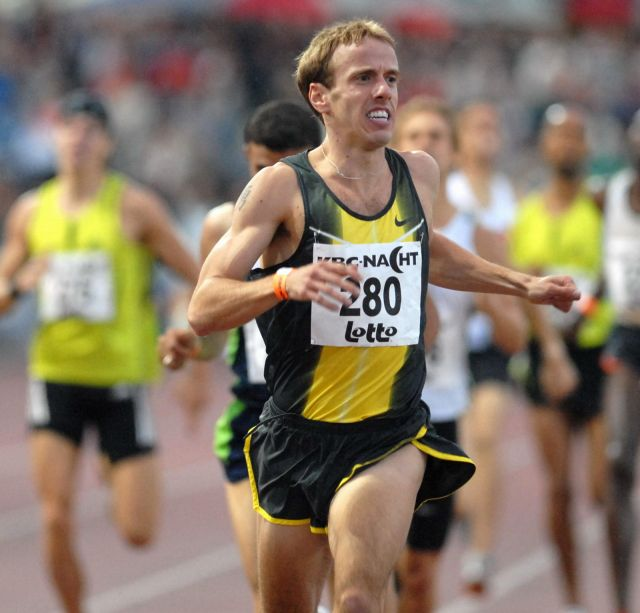
Alan Webb

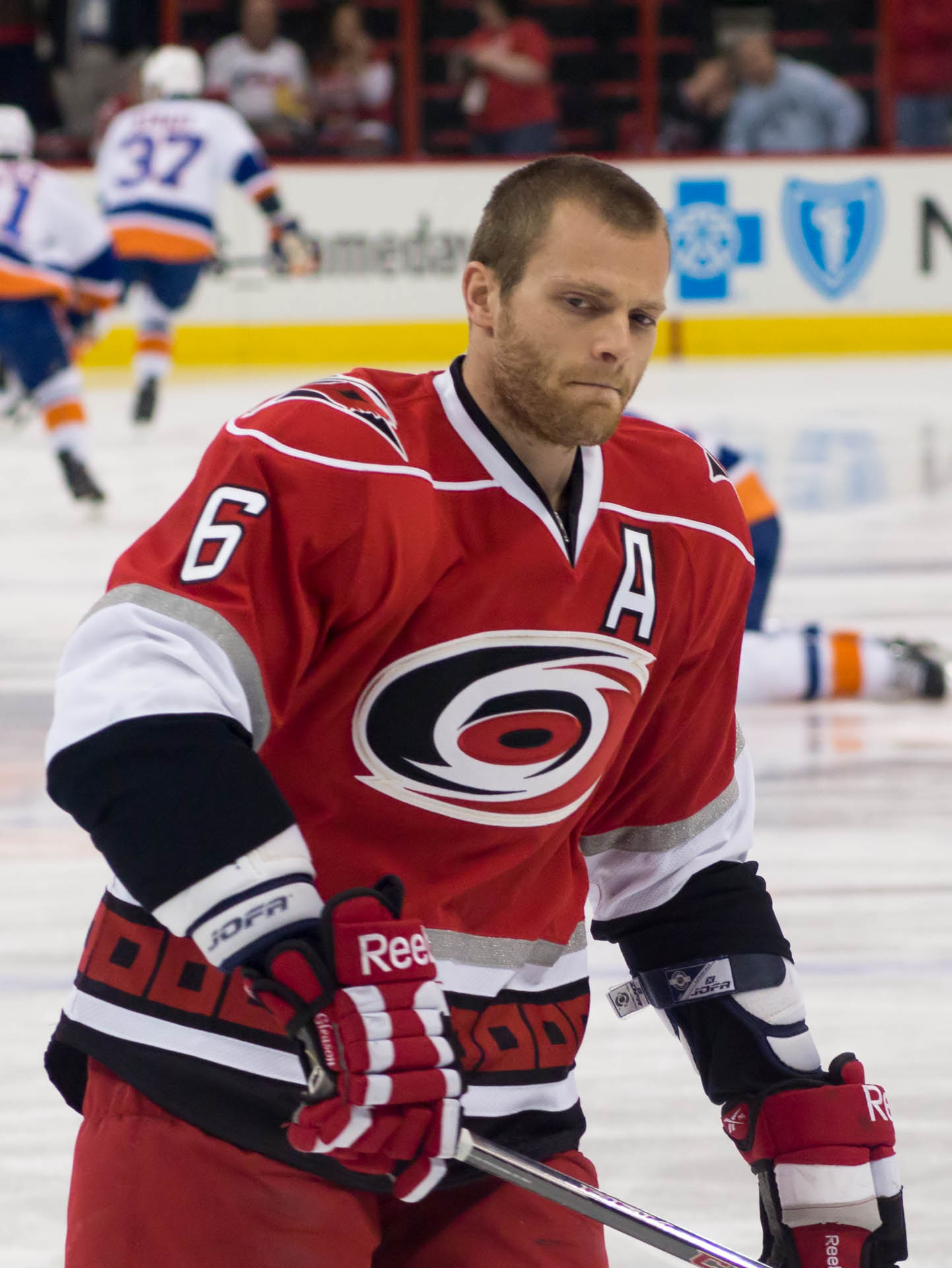
Tim Gleason

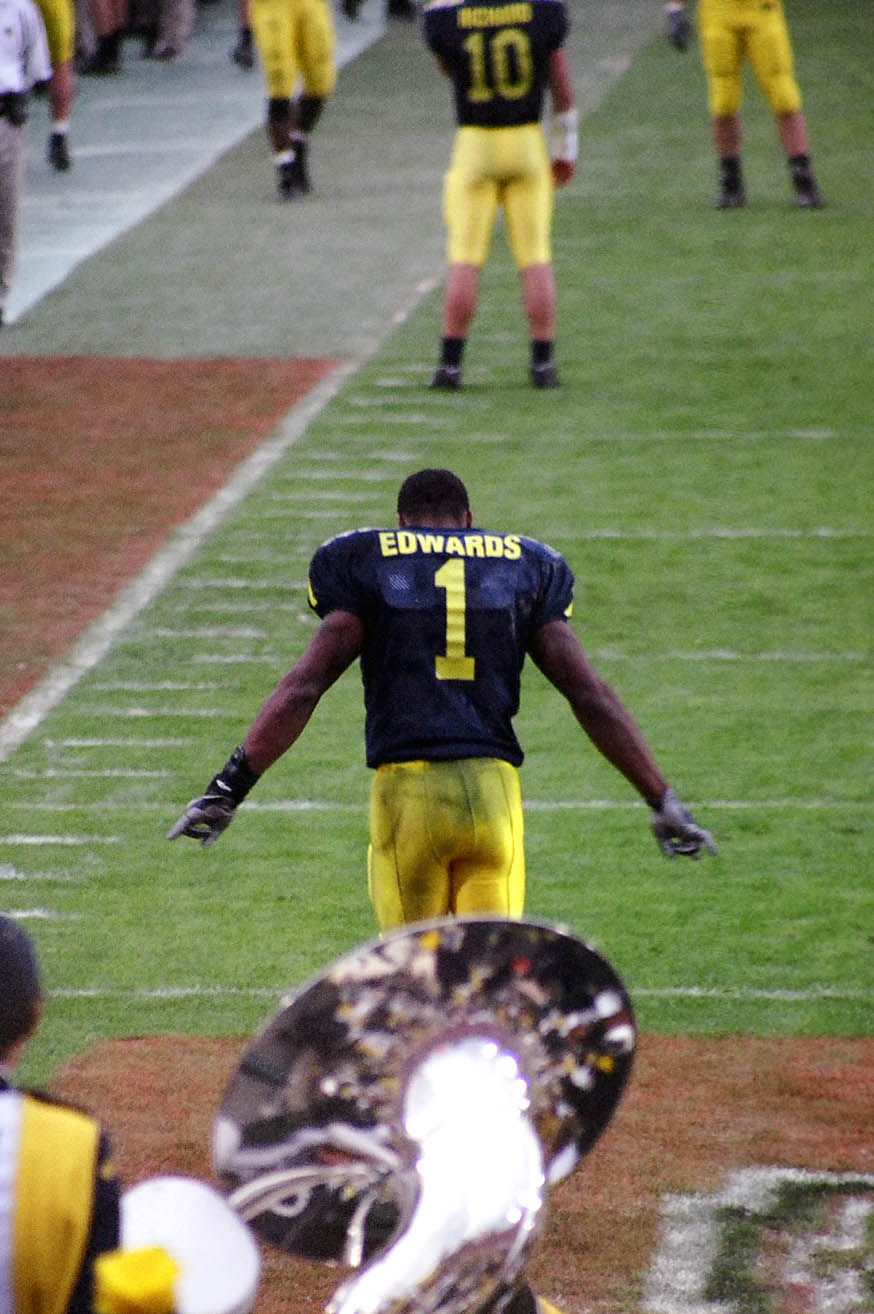
Braylon Edwards

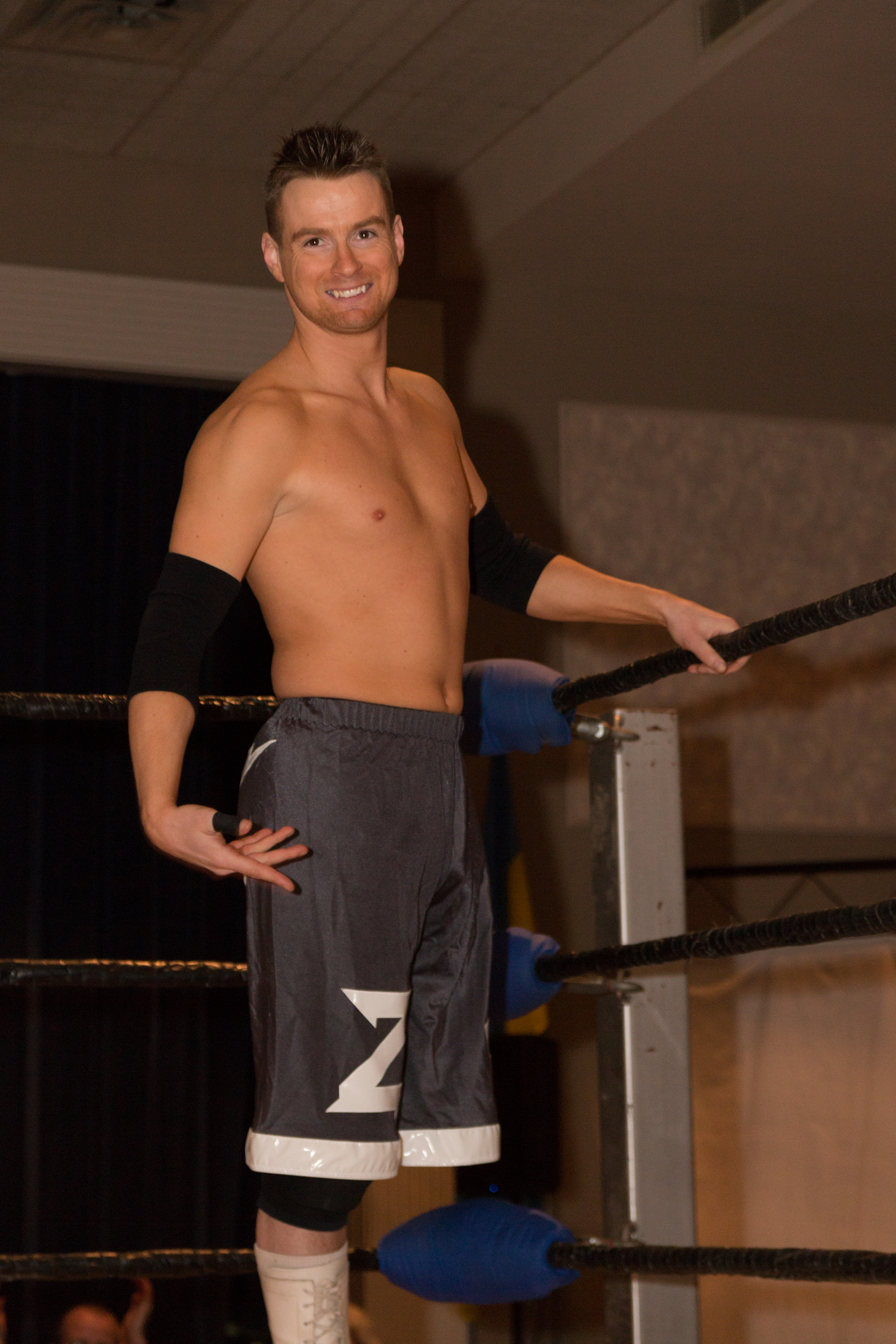
Zach Gowen

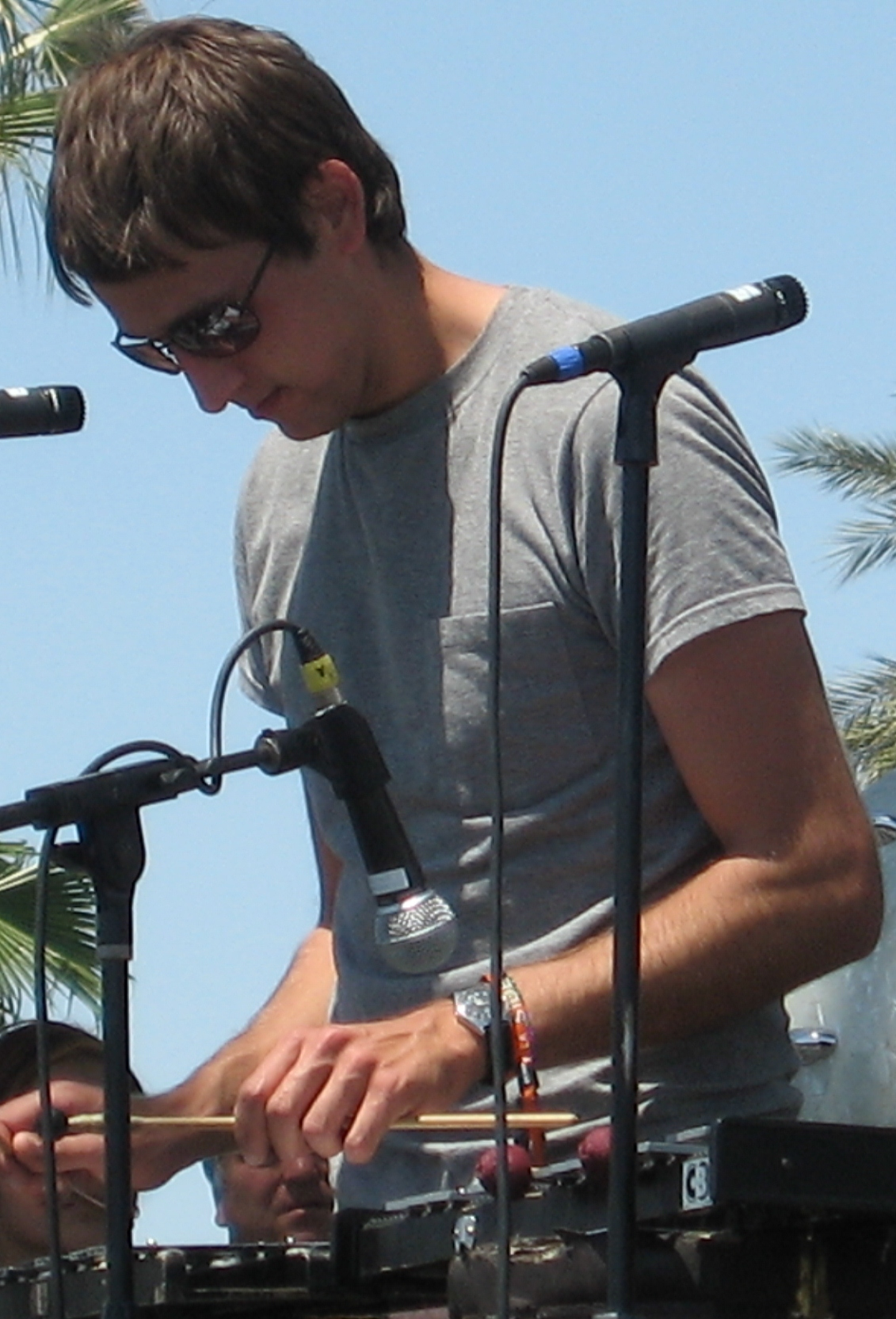
Andrew Dost

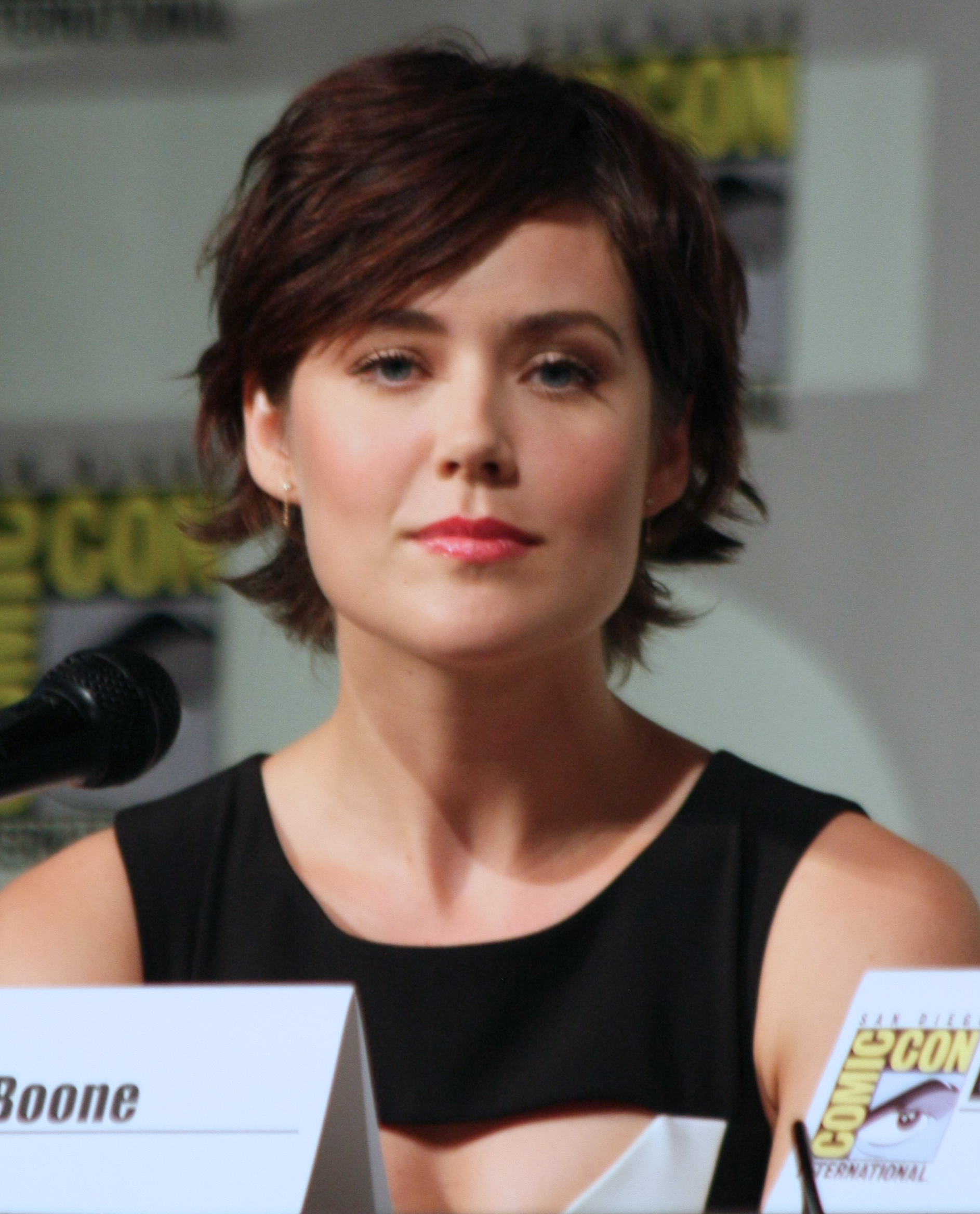
Megan Boone

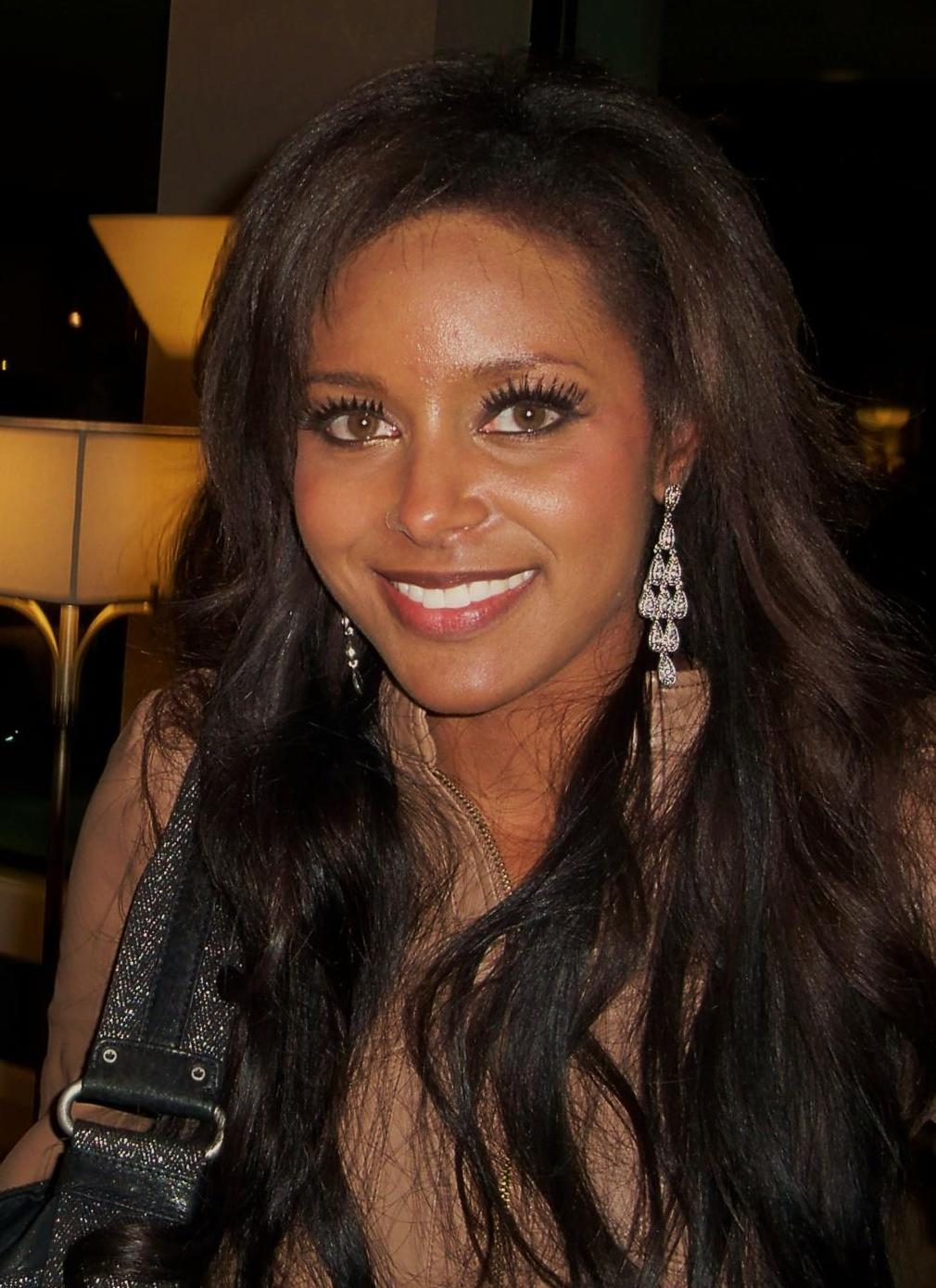
Brandi Rhodes

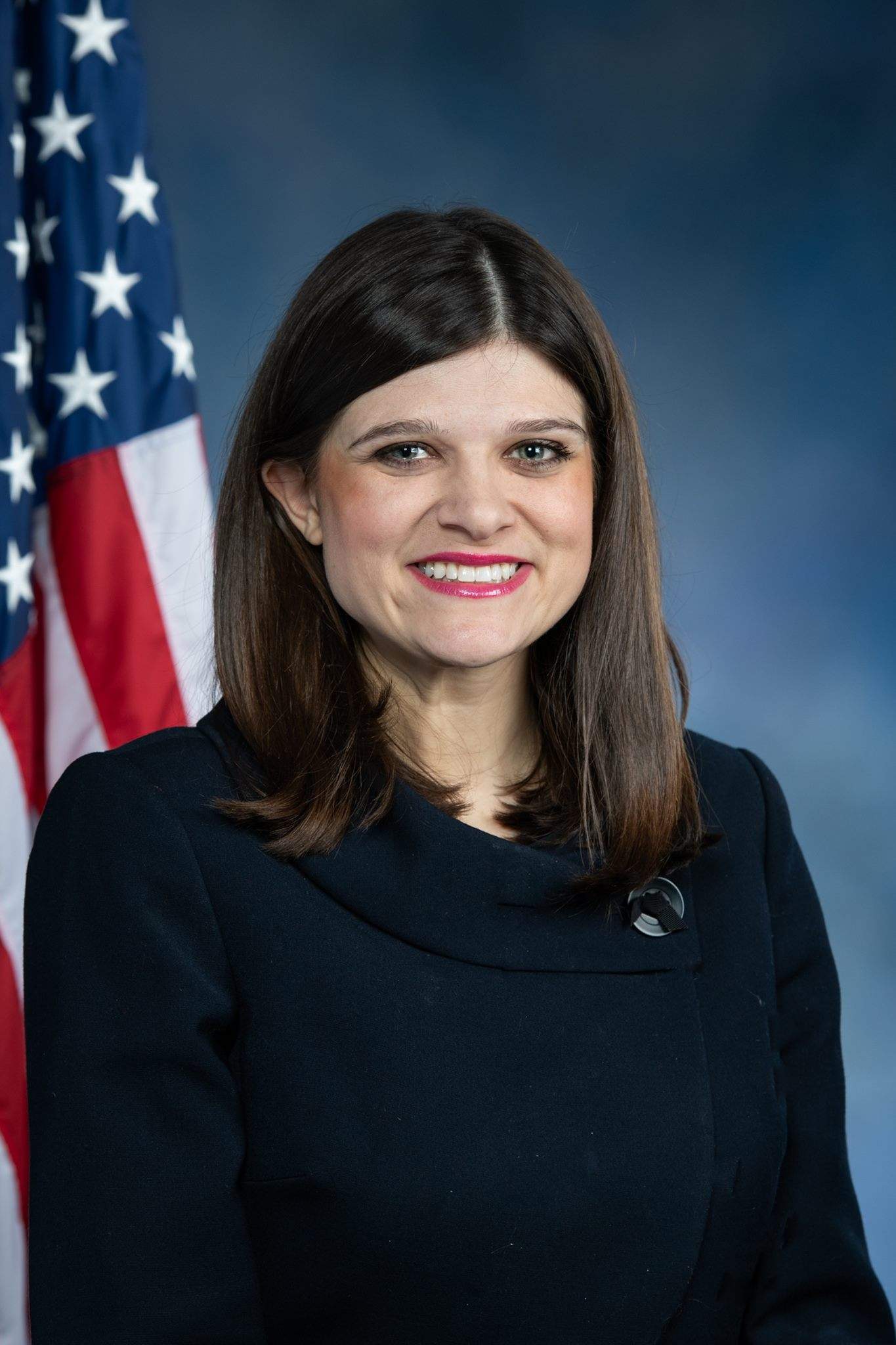
Haley Stevens

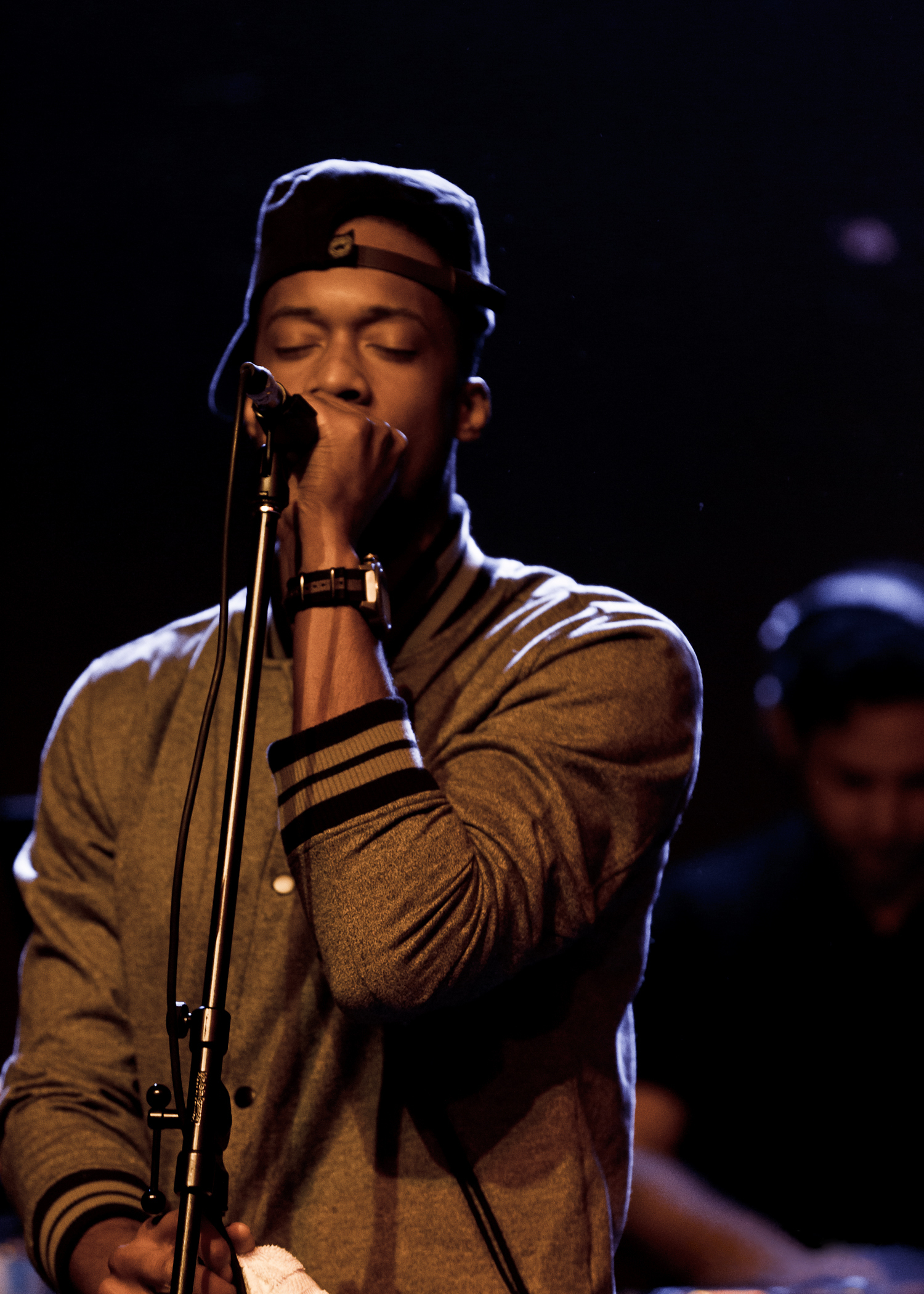
Black Milk

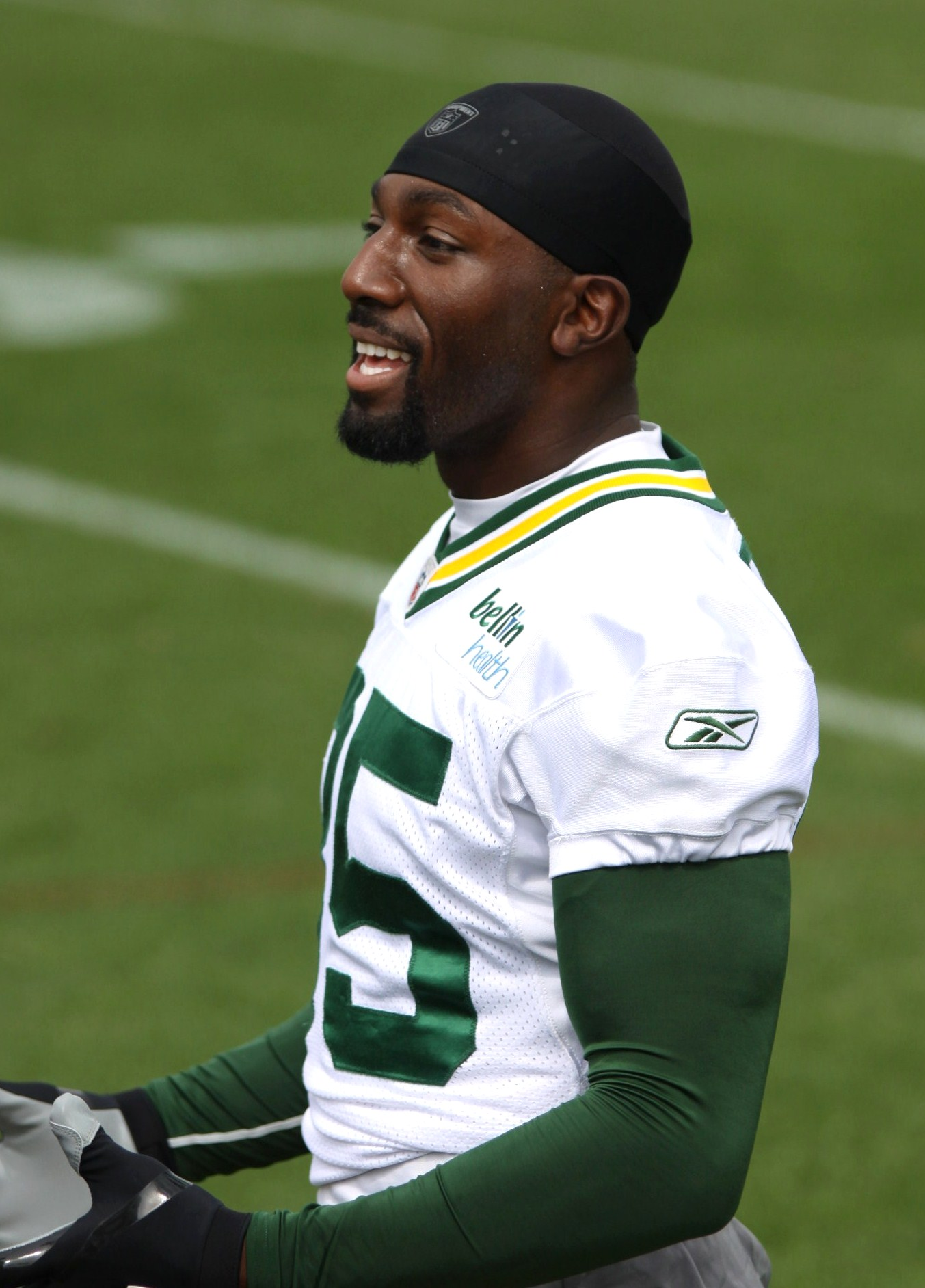
Greg Jennings

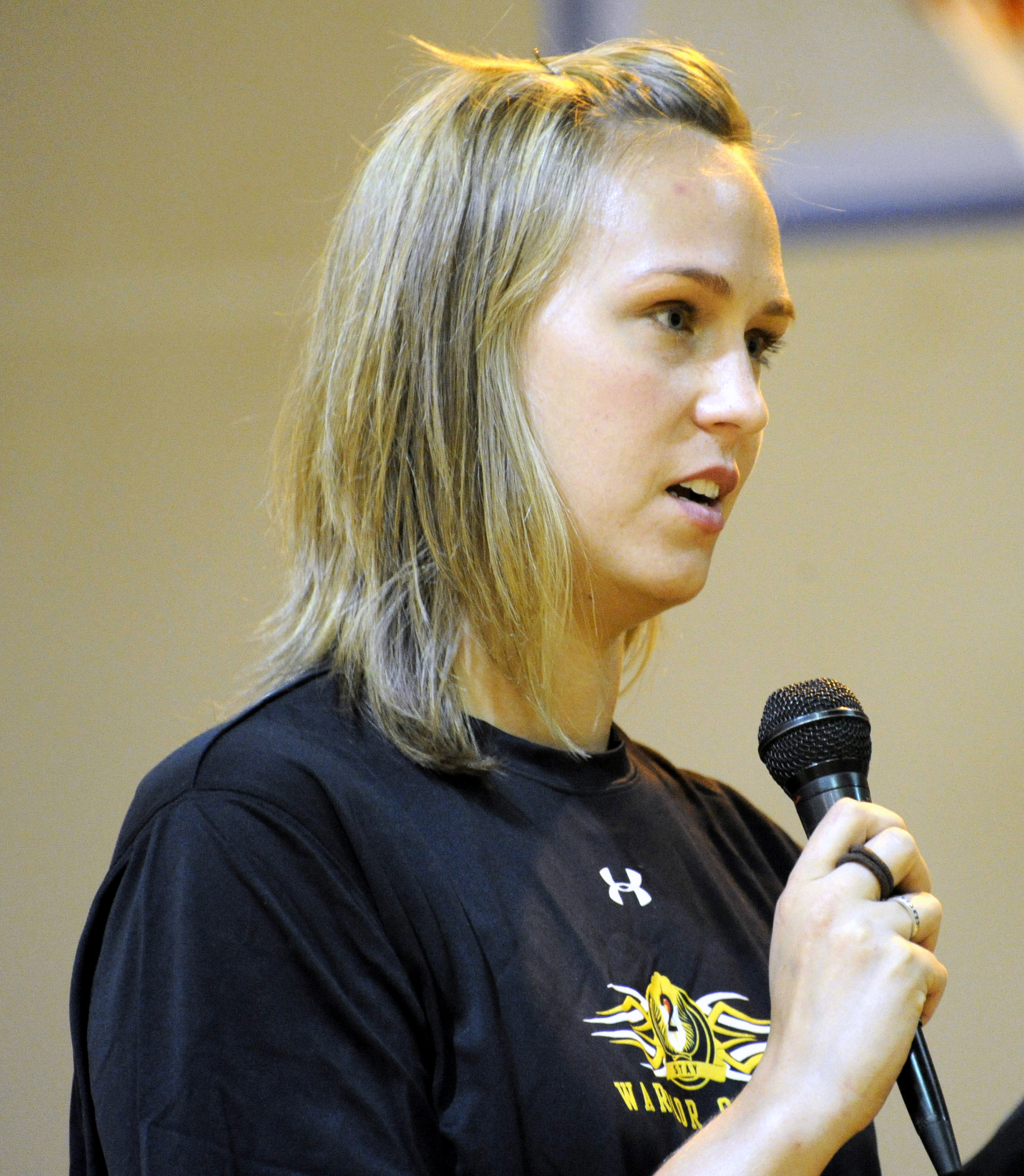
Carly Piper

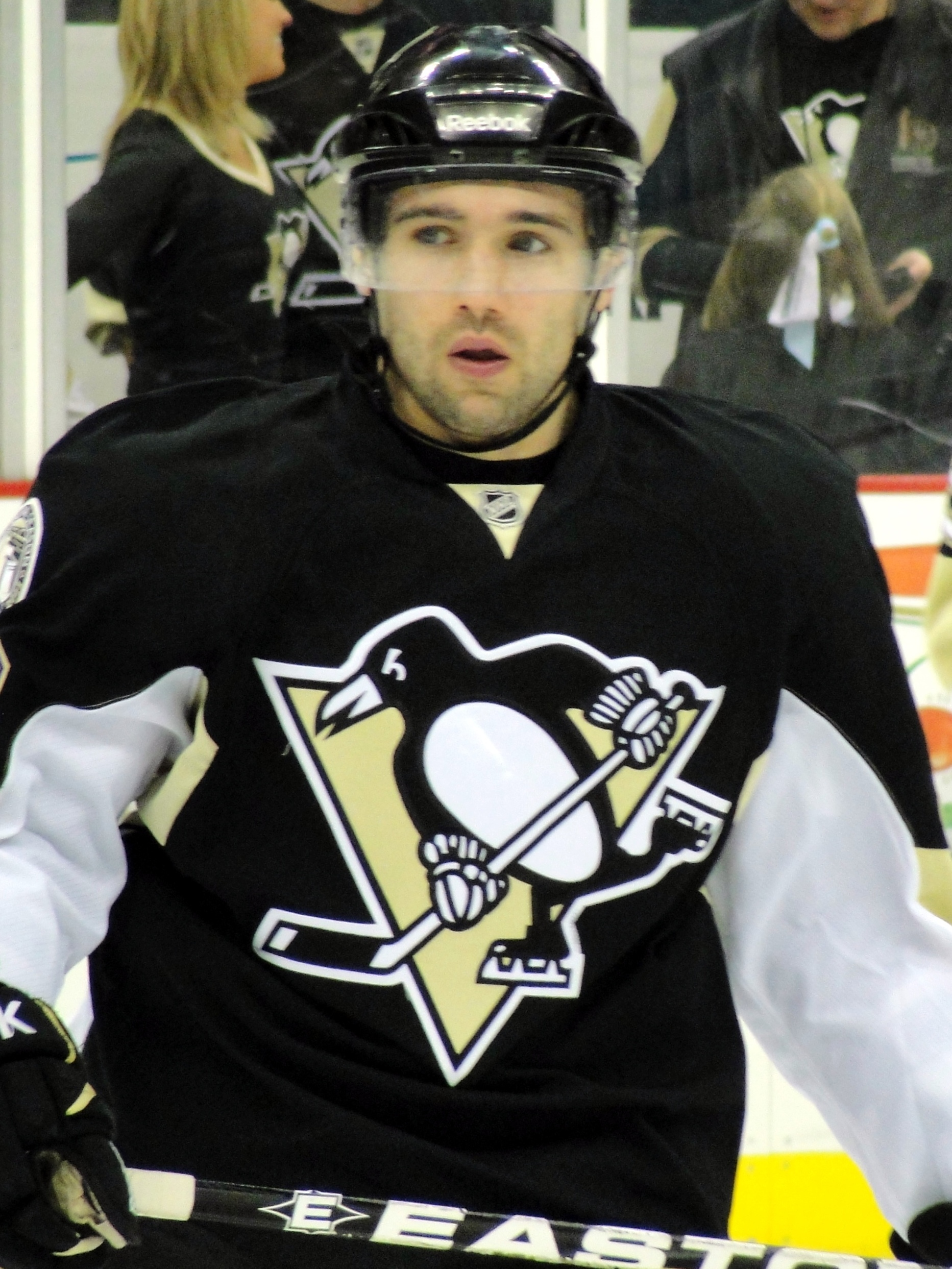
Chris Conner

== Deaths ==
- March 4 - Jim Pace, running back at Michigan and Big Ten MVP (1957), at age 47 in Culver City, California
- March 6 - John MacInnes, hockey coach at Michigan Tech (1956-1982) and 3x NCAA champion, at age 57 in Houghton, Michigan
- May - Ernie McCoy
- May 10 - Harold F. Youngblood, US Congressman (1947-1949), at age 75 in Tucson, Arizona
- June 15 - Elmer Mitchell
- July 8 - Vic Wertz, baseball player, at age 58 in Detroit
- July 28 - Elizabeth C. Crosby
- August 20 - Alden B. Dow, architect, at age 79 in Midland, Michigan
- September 1 - Arthur Herzog Jr., songwriter ("God Bless the Child" and "Don't Explain", at age 82 in Detroit
- December 30 - Willis Ward, football player and track star at Michigan, Big Ten athlete of the year in 1933, at age 71 in Detroit

=== Gallery of 1983 deaths ===
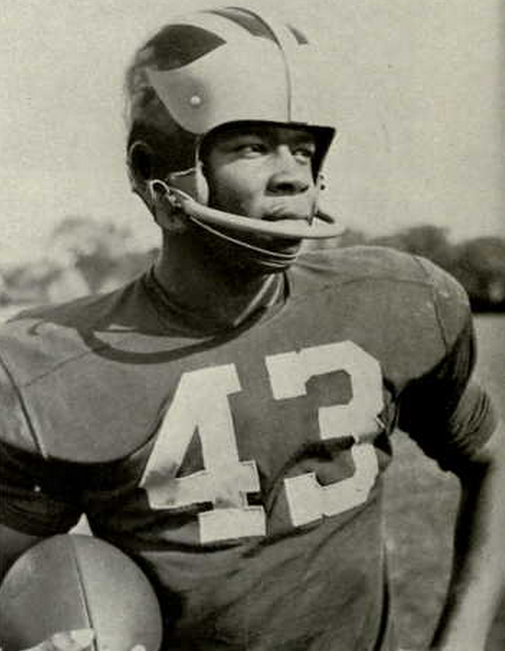
Jim Pace

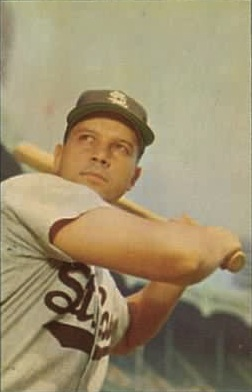
Vic Wertz

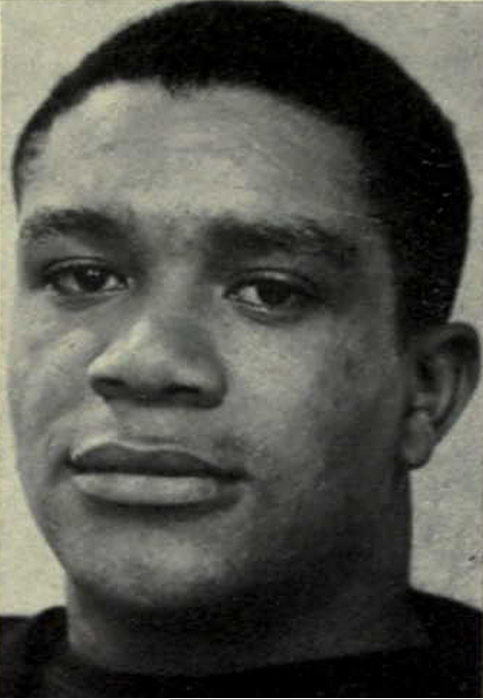
Willis Ward

== See also ==
- History of Michigan
- History of Detroit
