= Albert Wheeler =

American politician

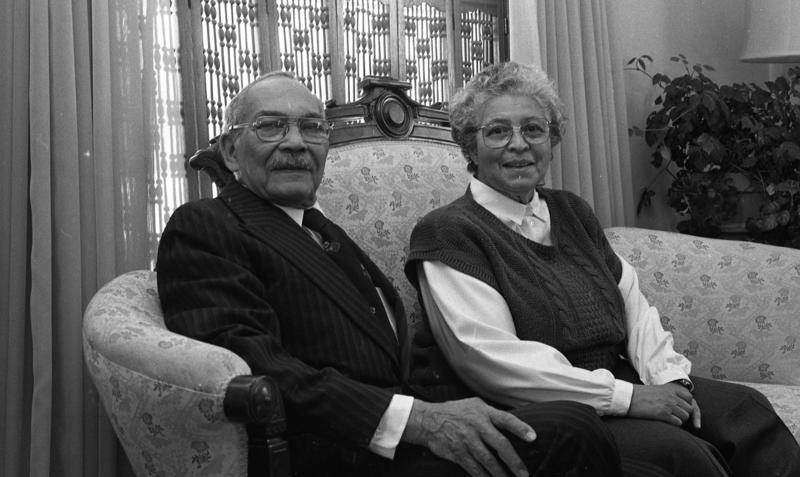
Former Ann Arbor, Michigan, Mayor Albert Wheeler and wife, Emma Wheeler, at home

Albert H. Wheeler (Dec. 11, 1915 – April 4, 1994) was an American life-sciences professor and politician in Ann Arbor, Michigan. He became the city's first African-American mayor, serving in the office from 1975 to 1978.

== Early career ==
Wheeler was born and raised raised in St. Louis, Missouri, to parents Harold and Elizabeth née Massey Wheeler and attended Lincoln University in Pennsylvania, majoring in biology. He then studied for his master's in microbiology at Iowa State University in Iowa. He moved to Ann Arbor to continue his studies, working toward a Ph.D. at the University of Michigan School of Public Health. After completing the doctoral degree, Wheeler took a job as a research associate at the university.

In 1952, he became an assistant professor of microbiology and immunology at the University of Michigan, and eventually became the university's first tenured African-American professor. Influenced by experiences of discrimination at the university and in attempting to secure a home mortgage in Ann Arbor, Wheeler also worked as a civil-rights activist on campus and in the city. He co-founded the Ann Arbor Civic Forum, which was conceived of and founded by Thomas S. Harrison, Jr., and which later became the city's NAACP chapter, and served as president of that body 1956-1957. His wife, Emma née Monteith, served in that role for the following 16 years. Wheeler, who was a Catholic, took leave from the university in the early 1970s to serve in the Archdiocese of Detroit.

== 1975 mayoral election ==
Wheeler first made a bid for the office of Ann Arbor mayor in April 1975. Running as a Democrat, he unseated the Republican incumbent mayor, James E. Stephenson. That election used the instant-runoff voting system, and it represented the first-ever use of IRV in a U.S. mayoral contest.

During the early and mid-1970s, the local, left-wing Human Rights Party (HRP) had gained a strong foothold in Ann Arbor municipal politics, electing several candidates to the city council. With the introduction of a strong third party in Ann Arbor, concerns grew among Democrats and HRP supporters that the city's progressive vote would be split, thus allowing Republicans to win offices on pluralities. Stephenson had won in just such a scenario in 1973, taking only 47% of the vote. To head off a repeat of this result, the HRP spearheaded a petition campaign to place the IRV system on the city ballot in spring 1974. Most Democratic and HRP voters supported the proposal, which passed with 52% approval.

During the April 1975 mayoral race, the only Ann Arbor contest using IRV, the Republican incumbent, Stephenson, received 49% of the first-choice ballots, leading Wheeler, who received 40%, and the HRP candidate Carol Ernst, who received 11%. However, since no candidate received a majority, IRV rules came into effect. Most HRP voters had ranked Wheeler as their second choice, and these votes moved to the Democrat's column, making Wheeler the winner by a slim margin of 121 votes. Ann Arbor voters repealed the system in an April 1976 special election.

== 1977 mayoral election and 1978 "special election" ==
In 1977, Wheeler ran for reelection, facing Republican challenger Louis D. Belcher. Wheeler won the election by a margin of a single vote, prevailing by a count of just 10,660 to 10,659. The election results, however, were challenged in court because twenty people who lived just outside city limits had voted without knowing that they were ineligible to cast ballots in Ann Arbor. A judge ordered that the voters reveal the name of the candidate for whom they had voted, in order to determine who would have won the election without the twenty ineligible votes, but University of Michigan student Susan R. Van Hattum refused the order on privacy grounds.

As the court challenge dragged on through 1977, Mayor Wheeler agreed to a new citywide vote—in effect, a "re-do" of the contested election—in order to end the contentious legal process. Belcher agreed, and the new election was held in 1978. This time, Belcher triumphed, ousting Wheeler from office and becoming mayor.

== Career after mayoral tenure ==
Wheeler died on April 4, 1994. Ann Arbor's Wheeler Park was named in his honor. Members of his family remain active in Michigan political life. Wheeler's daughter, Alma Wheeler Smith, was a member of the Michigan State Senate and is currently a member of the Michigan House of Representatives. Another daughter, Nancy Francis, has served as a Washtenaw County, Michigan probate judge since 1990. Wheeler's grandson, Conan Smith, served as a Washtenaw County commissioner, and was formerly an official with the Michigan Environmental Council from 2000 to 2004; in December 2008, Smith was elected chairperson of the Ann Arbor City Democratic Party. Conan Smith's ex-wife, Rebekah Warren, represented Ann Arbor as a member of the Michigan Senate and Michigan House. Wheeler's oldest daughter, Mary McDade, is an appellate court judge in Illinois.

Preceded by James E. Stephenson	Mayor of Ann Arbor, Michigan; 1975–1978	Succeeded by Louis D. Belcher
