= Mary S. Coleman =

American judge (1914–2001)

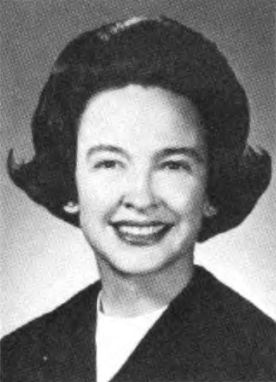
- Coleman c. 1977

Justice of the Michigan Supreme Court
- In office 1973–1982

Personal details
- Born: June 24, 1914; Forney, Texas, U.S.
- Died: November 27, 2001 (aged 87)
- Spouse: Creighton Coleman
- Education: University of Maryland; George Washington University
- Occupation: Judge
- Known for: First female chief justice of the Michigan Supreme Court

Mary Stallings Coleman (June 24, 1914 – November 27, 2001) was a justice of the Michigan Supreme Court from 1973 until 1982.

== Early life and career ==
Coleman was born in Forney, Texas, but grew up in Washington, DC. She did her undergraduate work at the University of Maryland, where she was twice voted Miss University of Maryland, and received her law degree from George Washington University Law School. Coleman eventually settled in Marshall, Michigan and became a circuit court judge in Calhoun County, where she had previously been a probate judge.

During this period she would marry Creighton Coleman, a Michigan circuit judge who was formerly Republican leader in the Michigan State Senate. She would have two daughters, both of whom became physicians.

== Career on the bench ==
Coleman ran for the Michigan Supreme Court in 1972. She was the first woman to run for this office, but gained substantial media support for advocating individual rights, judicial restraint, the rule of law and small-scale reforms of juvenile justice. She won the election and took office in 1973.

Upon her election, Coleman admitted that she was at odds with many of the court's decisions in previous years and she chalked up a reputation as a conservative judge who believed that courts must not

step into other branches of government

Despite her conservative reputation, Coleman always saw herself as a moderate, and in her first year she did write an opinion on women's property rights that received unanimous support and recognized married women's interest in their personal property.

With Gerald Ford and Ronald Reagan both seeking to nominate the first female Supreme Court of the United States Justice, Coleman was considered a possibility both to replace William O. Douglas in 1975, and to replace Potter Stewart at the next vacancy six years later. Coleman's age ultimately ruled her out: she was one year older than Justice Stewart himself, and at sixty-seven in 1981 was three years older than the oldest Justice ever appointed to the Court for the first time.

She ran for re-election 1978 and retired in 1982 two years before her second term ended. Governor William Milliken appointed Lieutenant Governor James H. Brickley to replace Coleman just before he and Brickley left office.

== Honors ==
On the Michigan Supreme Court, Coleman was elected the fourth female chief justice of any state, following Lorna E. Lockwood of Arizona, Susie Marshall Sharp of North Carolina, and Rose Bird of California.

Coleman is in the University of Maryland Hall of Fame and was an inaugural member of the Michigan Women's Hall of Fame.

== See also ==
- List of female state supreme court justices

== External sources ==
- Biography of Coleman
