= Louis Belcher =

American politician

Louis D. Belcher (born 1939) is an American politician who served as the mayor of Ann Arbor, Michigan, from 1978 to 1985. He won office in an unusual "special election" of 1978, held after lengthy court wranglings over the disputed 1977 mayoral contest, and went on to win three more two-year terms as mayor.

== Early career ==
Louis Belcher was born in 1939. In 1971, Belcher first ran for mayor of Ann Arbor, losing in the Republican primary to Jack J. Garris, who was then defeated in the general election by Democrat Robert J. Harris.

== Contested election of 1977 ==
In 1978, normally not a mayoral election year in Ann Arbor, Belcher became mayor under unusual circumstances. In April 1977, he had run as the Republican nominee against incumbent Democratic mayor Albert H. Wheeler, the city's first African-American mayor. Belcher lost by a margin of a single vote, with Wheeler prevailing by a count of 10,660 to 10,659. The election results, however, went to court because twenty people who lived just outside city limits had voted, without knowing that they were ineligible to cast ballots in Ann Arbor. A judge ordered that the voters reveal the name of the candidate for whom they had voted, in order to determine who would have won the election without the twenty ineligible votes. Two of the first five voters who were called to testify how they voted refused to do so, citing the secrecy of the ballot. The proceedings were adjourned, and the judge’s order was eventually reversed by the Michigan Supreme Court, which ruled that the voters did not have to testify about their votes.

After the Supreme Court ruling on ballot secrecy, several issues remained, including the validity of a handful of absentee ballots. Mayor Wheeler and Belcher settled the case by agreeing to a new, special election. The new election was held in 1978, with Belcher winning and becoming mayor.

== Belcher's subsequent mayoral terms ==
In 1979, Belcher ran for reelection, taking the Republican nomination unopposed and defeating Democratic candidate James Kenworthy in the April general election. Belcher went on to win two more terms, defeating Democratic challengers Robert G. Faber in April 1981 and Leslie Morris, who was attempting to become the city's first female mayor, in April 1983. At the time, his seven-year incumbency was the longest that a single person had held the Ann Arbor mayor's chair since the administration of Mayor William E. Brown, Jr. from 1945-57.

As mayor, Belcher was responsible for several initiatives in the areas of energy policy, historic preservation, and economic development. In 1981, Belcher established the Mayor's Energy Advisory Board (known since 1985 as the Ann Arbor Energy Commission), as an effort to develop ways for the city to become more energy efficient. In 1979, Belcher persuaded the city council to step in to save the Michigan Theater, a 1928 movie palace, preventing it from being sold to a developer and turned into a food court; the theater is now a successful non-profit organization. In 1982, Belcher responded to Parke-Davis's threat to leave Ann Arbor for Canada and The Netherlands by offering substantial city property-tax abatements, keeping the company in town.

| Preceded by Albert H. Wheeler | Mayor of Ann Arbor, Michigan; 1978–1985 | Succeeded by Edward C. Pierce |
