= William Faust =

American politician (1929–1995)

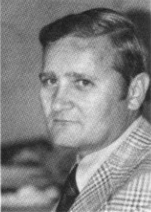

8th Majority Leader of the Michigan Senate
- In office 1976–1984
- Preceded by: William B. Fitzgerald, Jr.
- Succeeded by: John Engler

Member of the Michigan Senate
- In office January 1, 1967 – December 31, 1994
- Preceded by: Terry L. Troutt
- Succeeded by: Doug Carl
- Constituency: 13th district (1967–1982); 12th district (1983–1994)

Personal details
- Born: William Paul Faust; March 29, 1929 Bucyrus, Ohio
- Died: January 21, 1995 (aged 65) Lansing, Michigan
- Party: Democratic
- Education: University of Michigan (B.A.)

William Faust (March 29, 1929 – January 21, 1995) was a Democratic member of the Michigan Senate from 1967 through 1994, and was majority leader from 1976 to 1984.

== Early life ==
A native of Ohio, Faust attended Indiana University and earned a bachelor's degree from the University of Michigan in 1952. He undertook graduate work at Eastern Michigan University. Faust was a publisher and managing editor of several news publications before being elected a township trustee in 1960 and later supervisor in 1963 of Nankin Township.

== Senate career ==
In 1966, Faust won his first election to the Senate from a hospital bed as he was recovering from injuries sustained in a hit-and-run accident which eventually left him in a wheelchair. Ten years later, he was elected majority leader. In 1984, a series of by-elections cost the Democrats their majority in the Senate, and Faust continued as Democratic minority leader until he resigned his leadership position in April 1985. Until 2023, Faust was the last person to have been a Democratic majority leader in the Michigan Senate. While in the Senate, Faust was known for his efforts to build up state libraries and played a key role in the restoration of the Michigan State Capitol, including saving some glass panes from the ceiling of the Senate chamber. In total, Faust served seven terms in the Senate, retiring in 1994.

== Later life ==
Less than a month after leaving the Senate, and after coronary bypass surgery and having his gall bladder removed, Faust died on January 21, 1995, aged 65.

== See also ==
- List of Michigan state legislatures
