= 1988 in Michigan =

- Decades: 1960s; 1970s; 1980s; 1990s; 2000s
- See also: History of Michigan; Historical outline of Michigan; List of years in Michigan; 1988 in the United States

Events from the year 1988 in Michigan included: the bombing of Pan Am Flight 103 over Lockerbie, Scotland, while en route to Detroit; Jesse Jackson's victory over Michael Dukakis in the Michigan Democratic caucus; the crack cocaine epidemic in Detroit; the state's voters passing a ballot proposal prohibiting Medicaid-funded abortions; the induction of The Supremes into the Rock and Roll Hall of Fame; Grammy Awards won by multiple Michigan artists (including Aretha Franklin, Anita Baker, Smokey Robinson, Yusef Lateef, Robin Williams, CeCe Winans, and Narada Michael Walden); Steve Yzerman's emergence as the state's most popular athlete; and the Detroit Pistons defeating the Boston Celtics in the NBA semifinals before losing to the Los Angeles Lakers in seven games of the 1988 NBA Finals.

== Top Michigan news stories ==
The Associated Press (AP) selected the top stories in Michigan for 1988 as follows:

1. Michigan voters in November 1988 approved Proposal A prohibiting Medicaid-paid abortions. It passed by a margin of 1.94 million to 1.48 million. With the vote, Michigan joined 36 other states in banning Medicaid abortions. In 1987, Michigan had spent $6 million to fund 18,000 abortions. The Michigan Legislature had voted 17 times to ban Medicaid-funded abortions between 1977 and 1987 but it was vetoed each time by Governors James Blanchard or William Milliken.
2. A drought that shriveled crops and led Gov. James Blanchard to impose a statewide ban on outdoor burning, fireworks and cigarette smoking.
3. Presidential politics, including Pat Robertson's popularity, Jesse Jackson's victory in the Michigan caucus, and Michael Dukakis losing the state.
4. (tie) The creation of the Michigan Education Trust guaranteeing college tuition for youngsters who enrolled. Some 40,344 children were enrolled in 1988.
5. (tie) Debate over changes in school financing.
6. Medical waste, including hypodermic needles with traces of blood, washed up on Lake Michigan shoreline, forcing temporary beach closures.
7. The approval and subsequent litigation over the joint operating agreement (JOA) between The Detroit News and Detroit Free Press. The papers, rivals for 115 years, combined business operations. The JOA was approved by Attorney General Edwin Meese in August 1988.
8. The trial and conviction of Alberta Easter and her three sons (William, George and Roy Lemons) for the July 1987 Inkster police slayings in which three Inkster police officers (Sgt. Ira Parker and officers Daniel Dubiel and Clay Hoover) were killed in a hail of gunfire inside a room at the Bungalow Motel. The officers were trying to serve a warrant on Easter for writing a bad check. After a 13-week trial, the jury in August 1988 found all four guilty of first-degree murder
9. The war against crack cocaine in Detroit, including raids on hundreds of crackhouses and trials and convictions of Richard Wershe Jr. ("White Boy Rick") and the Chambers Brothers gang.
10. The 10-day hunt for Vincent Loonsfoot through Upper Peninsula woods. Loonsfoort was wanted for fatally shooting four members of his ex-wife's family at the Hannahville Indian Reservation near Escanaba. Loonsfoot eventually surrendered. He was convicted on four counts of first-degree murder in December 1988.

The AP voting was conducted prior to the December 23 crash of Pan Am Flight 103 en route from Frankfurt and London to Detroit.

The AP also conducted a poll of Michigan sports editors who selected the state's top sports stories as follows:

1. The 1987–88 Detroit Pistons defeating the Boston Celtics in the NBA semifinals before losing to the Los Angeles Lakers in seven games of the 1988 NBA Finals.
2. The 1987 Michigan State Spartans football team's 20–17 victory over USC in the 1988 Rose Bowl.
3. The 1987–88 Detroit Red Wings advancing the Stanley Cup semifinals where they lost to the eventual Stanley Cup champion Edmonton Oilers in five games.
4. Kirk Gibson's signing as a free agent with the Los Angeles Dodgers.
5. The Detroit Tigers finishing in second place by one game in the American League East.
6. The Detroit Lions' firing of Darryl Rogers and replacing him with Wayne Fontes.
7. Flint native Jim Abbott leading the US baseball team in the baseball competition at the 1988 Summer Olympics.
8. The 1988 Michigan Wolverines football team winning the Big Ten championship and earning a berth in the 1989 Rose Bowl.
9. Steve Yzerman emerging as a star with a 50-goal season.
10. The Red Wings' suspension of Bob Probert and Petr Klíma and their rejoining the team in November.

In a separate poll by the Detroit Free Press, readers selected the top sports figures of 1988. The top 10 were Steve Yzerman (162 points), Jim Abbott (117 points), kayaker and 2x gold medalist Greg Barton (82 points), Traverse City football coach Jim Ooley (81 points), Central Michigan basketball player Dan Majerle (70 points), Isiah Thomas (57 points), Farmington Hills quarterback Mill Coleman (52 points), Kirk Gibson (44 points), Bo Schembechler (35 points), and Steve Avery (Steve Avery (baseball) or Steve Avery (American football)?) (33 points).

== Office holders ==
=== State office holders ===
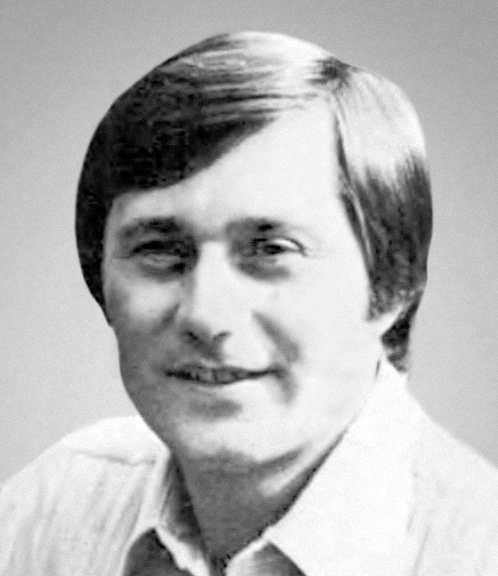
Gov. Blanchard

- Governor of Michigan: James Blanchard (Democrat)
- Lieutenant Governor of Michigan: Martha Griffiths (Democrat)
- Michigan Attorney General: Frank J. Kelley (Democrat)
- Michigan Secretary of State: Richard H. Austin (Democrat)
- Speaker of the Michigan House of Representatives: Gary Owen (Democrat)
- Majority Leader of the Michigan Senate: John Engler (Republican)
- Chief Justice, Michigan Supreme Court: Dorothy C. Riley

=== Mayors of major cities ===
- Mayor of Detroit: Coleman Young
- Mayor of Grand Rapids: Gerald R. Helmholdt
- Mayor of Warren, Michigan: Ronald L. Bonkowski
- Mayor of Sterling Heights, Michigan: Jean DiRezze Gush
- Mayor of Flint: Matthew S. Collier
- Mayor of Dearborn: Michael Guido
- Mayor of Lansing: Terry John McKane
- Mayor of Ann Arbor: Gerald Jernigan (Republican)
- Mayor of Saginaw: Delbert J. Schrems

=== Federal office holders ===
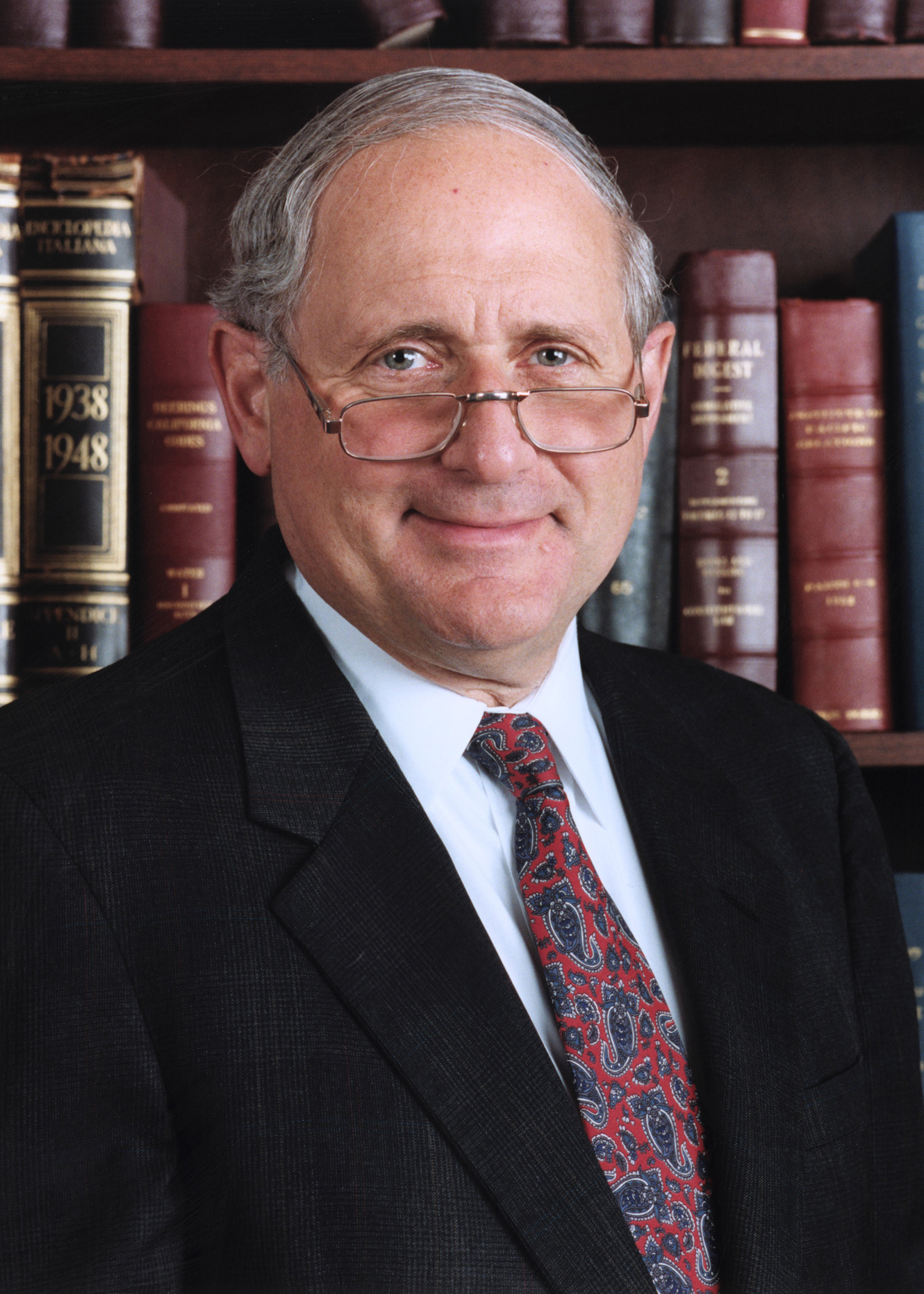
Sen. Levin

- U.S. Senator from Michigan: Donald W. Riegle Jr. (Democrat)
- U.S. Senator from Michigan: Carl Levin (Democrat)
- House District 1: John Conyers (Democrat)
- House District 2: Carl Pursell (Republican)
- House District 3: Howard Wolpe (Republican)
- House District 4: Fred Upton (Republican)
- House District 5: Harold S. Sawyer (Republican)
- House District 6: Bob Carr (Democrat)
- House District 7: Dale Kildee (Democrat)
- House District 8: J. Bob Traxler (Democrat)
- House District 9: Guy Vander Jagt (Republican)
- House District 10: Bill Schuette (Republican)
- House District 11: Robert William Davis (Republican)
- House District 12: David Bonior (Democrat)
- House District 13: George Crockett Jr. (Democrat)
- House District 14: Dennis M. Hertel (Democrat)
- House District 15: William D. Ford (Democrat)
- House District 16: John Dingell (Democrat)
- House District 17: Sander Levin (Democrat)
- House District 18: William Broomfield (Republican)

== Population ==
In the 1980 United States census, Michigan was recorded as having a population of 9,259,000 persons, ranking as the eighth most populous state in the country. By 1990, the state's population had grown only marginally by 0.4% to 9,259,000 persons.

=== Cities ===
The following is a list of cities in Michigan with a population of at least 50,000 based on 1980 U.S. Census data. Historic census data from 1970 and 1990 is included to reflect trends in population increases or decreases. Cities that are part of the Detroit metropolitan area are shaded in tan.

1980 Rank	City	County	1970 Pop.	1980 Pop.	1990 Pop.	Change 1980-90
1	Detroit	Wayne	1,514,063	1,203,368	1,027,974	−14.6% ▼
2	Grand Rapids	Kent	197,649	181,843	189,126	4.0% ▲
3	Warren	Macomb	179,260	161,134	144,864	−10.1% ▼
4	Flint	Genesee	193,317	159,611	140,761	−11.8% ▼
5	Lansing	Ingham	131,403	130,414	127,321	−2.4% ▼
6	Sterling Heights	Macomb	61,365	108,999	117,810	8.1% ▲
7	Ann Arbor	Washtenaw	100,035	107,969	109,592	1.5% ▲
8	Livonia	Wayne	110,109	104,814	100,850	−3.8% ▼
9	Dearborn	Wayne	104,199	90,660	89,286	−1.5%▼
10	Westland	Wayne	86,749	84,603	84,724	0.1% ▲
11	Kalamazoo	Kalamazoo	85,555	79,722	80,277	0.7% ▲
12	Taylor	Wayne	70,020	77,568	70,811	−8.7% ▼
13	Saginaw	Saginaw	91,849	77,508	69,512	−10.3% ▼
14	Pontiac	Oakland	85,279	76,715	71,166	−7.2% ▼
15	St. Clair Shores	Macomb	88,093	76,210	68,107	−10.6% ▼
16	Southfield	Oakland	69,298	75,608	75,745	0.2% ▲
17	Royal Oak	Oakland	86,238	70,893	65,410	−7.7% ▼
18	Dearborn Heights	Wayne	80,069	67,706	60,838	−10.1% ▼
19	Troy	Oakland	39,419	67,102	72,884	8.6% ▲
20	Wyoming	Kent	56,560	59,616	63,891	7.2% ▲
21	Farmington Hills	Oakland	--	58,056	74,611	28.5% ▲
22	Roseville	Macomb	60,529	54,311	51,412	−5.3% ▼
23	East Lansing	Ingham	47,540	51,392	50,677	−1.4% ▼

=== Counties ===
The following is a list of counties in Michigan with populations of at least 100,000 based on 1980 U.S. Census data. Historic census data from 1970 and 1990 are included to reflect trends in population increases or decreases. Counties that are part of the Detroit metropolitan area are shaded in tan.

1980 Rank	County	Largest city	1970 Pop.	1980 Pop.	1990 Pop.	Change 1980-90
1	Wayne	Detroit	2,666,751	2,337,891	2,111,687	−9.7% ▼
2	Oakland	Pontiac	907,871	1,011,793	1,083,592	7.1% ▲
3	Macomb	Warren	625,309	694,600	717,400	3.3% ▲
4	Genesee	Flint	444,341	450,449	430,459	−4.4% ▼
5	Kent	Grand Rapids	411,044	444,506	500,631	12.6% ▲
6	Ingham	Lansing	261,039	275,520	281,912	2.3% ▲
7	Washtenaw	Ann Arbor	234,103	264,748	282,937	6.9% ▲
8	Saginaw	Saginaw	219,743	228,059	211,946	−7.1% ▼
9	Kalamazoo	Kalamazoo	201,550	212,378	223,411	5.2% ▲
10	Berrien	Benton Harbor	163,875	171,276	161,378	−5.8% ▼
11	Muskegon	Muskegon	157,426	157,589	158,983	0.9% ▲
12	Ottawa	Holland	128,181	157,174	187,768	19.5% ▲
13	Jackson	Jackson	143,274	151,495	149,756	−1.1% ▼
14	Calhoun	Battle Creek	141,963	141,557	135,982	−3.9% ▼
15	St. Clair	Port Huron	120,175	138,802	145,607	4.9% ▲
16	Monroe	Monroe	118,479	134,659	133,600	−0.8% ▼
17	Bay	Bay City	117,339	119,881	111,723	−6.8% ▼
18	Livingston	Howell	58,967	100,289	115,645	15.3% ▲

== Sports ==
=== Baseball ===
- 1988 Detroit Tigers season - Led by manager Sparky Anderson, the Tigers compiled an 88-74 record, one game behind the first-place Boston Red Sox. The team's statistical leaders included Alan Trammell (.311 batting average, 69 RBIs), Darrell Evans (22 home runs), Jack Morris (15 wins), and Mike Henneman (1.87 ERA).

=== American football ===
- 1988 Detroit Lions season - Led by head coaches Darryl Rogers (11 games) and Wayne Fontes (6 games), the Lions compiled a 4–12 record. The team's leaders included Rusty Hilger (1,558 passing yards), Garry James (552 rushing yards), Pete Mandley (617 receiving yards, Eddie Murray (82 points scored), and Chris Spielman (153 tackles).
- 1988 Michigan Wolverines football team - In their 20th year under head coach Bo Schembechler, the Wolverines compiled a 9–2–1 record, won the Big Ten championship, and defeated USC in the 1989 Rose Bowl. The team's statistical leaders included quarterback Michael Taylor (957 passing yards), tailback Tony Boles (1,408 rushing yards), split end Greg McMurtry (470 receiving yards), and placekicker Mike Gillette (97 points scored).
- 1988 Michigan State Spartans football team - In their sixth year under head coach George Perles, the Spartans compiled a 6–5–1 record. The team's statistical leaders included Bobby McAllister (1,118 passing yards), Blake Ezor (1,350 rushing yards), Andre Rison (30 receptions for 709 yards), and John Langeloh (83 points scored).

=== Basketball ===
- 1987–88 Detroit Pistons season - Led by head coach Chuck Daly, the Pistons compiled a 54–28 record, advancing the NBA Finals where they lost to the Los Angeles Lakers in seven games. Statistical leaders included Isiah Thomas (1,577 points, 678 assists) and Bill Laimbeer (832 rebounds).
- 1987–88 Michigan Wolverines men's basketball team - Led by Bill Frieder, the Wolverines compiled a 26–8 record and advanced to the Sweet Sixteen. Statistical leaders included Glen Rice (728 points, 236 rebounds) and Gary Grant (234 assists).
- 1987–88 Michigan State Spartans men's basketball team

=== Ice hockey ===
- 1987–88 Detroit Red Wings season - Led by coach Jacques Demers, the Red Wings compiled a 41–28–11 record, losing to eventual Stanley Cup champion Edmonton Oilers.

== Music and culture ==
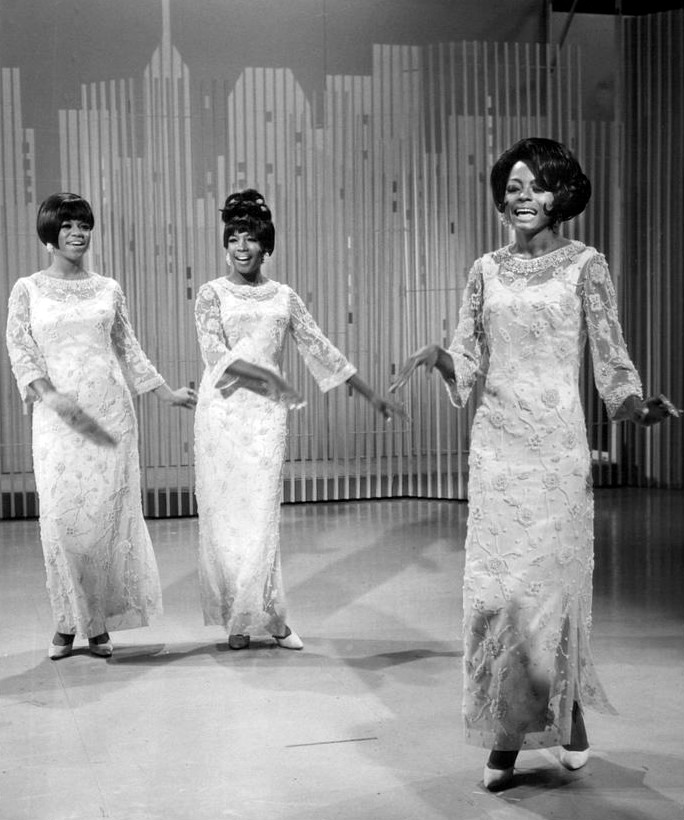
The Supremes 1966

- January 20 - Motown's The Supremes were inducted into the Rock and Roll Hall of Fame (along with The Beatles, Bob Dylan and the Beach Boys). Diana Ross did not attend the induction ceremony. Mary Wilson was the only member to appear at the ceremony, as Florence Ballard died in 1976, and Cindy Birdsong, who joined the group in 1967, was not invited.
- January 25 - Anita Baker won twice at the American Music Awards of 1988: Favorite Soul/R&B Female Artist and Favorite Soul/R&B Album (Rapture)
- February 17 - "Young at Heart", a documentary by Detroit filmmakers, received an Academy Award nomination. It later won the award.
- March 2 - Multiple Michigan artists won Grammy Awards. Aretha Franklin won two with one award each to Anita Baker, Smokey Robinson, Yusef Lateef, Robin Williams, CeCe Winans, and Narada Michael Walden.
- March 4 - Smokey Robinson's single "Just to See Her" was released. It awarded the 1988 Grammy Award for Grammy Award for Best Male R&B Vocal Performance.
- March 31 - University of Michigan professor William Bolcom won the Pulitzer Prize in music for his composition "12 New Etudes for Piano"
- October 18 - Anita Baker's Giving You the Best That I Got (album) was released. It went to No. 1 on the Billboard 200 album chart.
- November 5 - The song "If We Hold On Together" by Diana Ross, the theme song from The Land Before Time, became a hit (No. 1 in Japan).
- November 17 - You Can Dance album from Madonna was released, featuring remixes of tracks from her first three albums, including Holiday and Into the Groove.
- Stevie Wonder's "Skeletons" received two 1988 Grammy Award nominations for Best R&B Song and Best Male R&B Vocal Performance.

== Chronology of events ==
=== January ===
- January 1 - The 1997 Michigan State Spartans football team defeated USC in the 1988 Rose Bowl.
- January 2 - Protests over the USA-Canada free trade agreement clogged the Ambassador Bridge in Detroit
- January 4 - Former state Senator Basil W. Brown sentenced to six months in prison for delivering cocaine and marijuana to a prostitute.
- January 8 - Former Michigan National Bank chairman Stanford "Bud" Stoddard sentenced to three years in federal prison following his conviction for fraud.
- January 10 - Auto dealer Michael Rinke and two others died after crash of small airplane following takeoff from Oakland Pontiac Airport.
- January 13 - Two were injured after shootout between two mothers at Stellwagen Elementary School in Detroit.
- January 29 - Kirk Gibson signed with the Los Angeles Dodgers, ending his time with the Detroit Tigers.

=== February ===
- February 4 - "White Boy Rick" Wershe sentenced to life in prison.
- February 12 - Detroit Mayor Coleman Young appointed a commission to study casino gambling in the city.
- February 18 - Ford reported a $4.6 billion profit for 1987, the largest profit ever reported by an automobile company. Workers received average profit-sharing payout of $3,700.
- February 24 - Lee Iacocca said he would probably accept if nominated as the Democratic Party candidate for President.

=== March ===
- March 1 - General Motors discontinued the Pontiac Fiero and closed the plant in Pontiac, Michigan, making the Fiero the last Pontiac to be built in Pontiac.
- March 7 - Jim Abbott won the Sullivan Award as the country's top amateur athlete.
- March 14 - Michigan basketball player Gary Grant selected as an All-American by both the Associated Press and the United Press International and was selected as the most valuable player in the Big Ten Conference.
- March 26 - Jesse Jackson won the Michigan Democratic presidential caucus with 54% to 28% to Michael Dukakis and 13% for Richard Gephardt. The victory gave Jackson the overall lead in the delegate count.

=== May ===
- May 29 - Detroit archbishop Edmund Szoka elevated to cardinal. The formal elevation ceremony took place in Rome on June 28.

=== June ===
- June 8 - Detroit's Casino Gambling Study Commission voted in favor of casinos in Detroit.
- June 10 - James Duderstadt appointed president of the University of Michigan.
- June 15 - A suspended police officer, Henry Jones, age 24, went on shooting rampage in Detroit, killing three and then killing self.
- June 21 - Pistons lost Game 7 of NBA Finals to the Lakers.
- June 25 - Record high of 104 for the date in Detroit. One degree short of the city's all-timee high temperature.
- June 28 - Motown Records sold for $61 million to MCA inc. and an investment banking firm, Boston Ventures. Berry Gordy retained the company's sheet music business, Jobete Music Corp, and its film business, Gordy Co.

=== August ===
- August 2 - Voters rejected proposal for casino gambling in Detroit.
- August 5 - As heat wave continued, leaving five dead in Detroit.
- August 8 - After a 13-week trial, Alberta Easter and her three sons were all found guilty of first-degree murder in the Inkster police slayings.
- August 13 - The Palace of Auburn Hills, built at a cost of $70 million opened with Sting playing the inaugural show before a capacity crowd of 16,587.

=== September ===
- September 5 - Michael Dukakis speech at Detroit's traditional Labor Day celebration in Detroit. Dan Quayle speech in Hamtramck.
- September - Medical waste washed up on Lake Michigan shoreline, forcing closure of beaches in Oceana County.
- September 14 - Judge in Inkster police slayings sentences Alberta Easter and her three sons to life in prison and ordered them to be separated for life.
- September 28 - Detroit archbishop Edmund Szoka announces plan to close 43 urban parishes in order to cope with flight of Catholics from the core city.
- September 28 - Jim Abbott was the winning pitcher in Team USA's gold medal game with Japan at the Summer Olympics in Seoul.
- September 30 - Greg Barton of Homer, Michigan, became the first American to win a gold medal in kayaking.

=== October ===
- October 8 - Michigan defeated Michigan State, 17-3, in annual rivalry game.
- October 11 - Six killed and ten injured in crash of a tanker plane at Wurtsmith Air Force Base in Oscoda, Michigan.
- October 15 - Kirk Gibson's 1988 World Series home run
- October 17 - Mentally ill gunmen Charles Knowles kills two Detroit police officers (Lt. James Schmit, 41, and Officer Frank Wills, 39) and is then killed in shootout on Detroit's east side.
- October 18 - Denny McLain pleaded guilty to federal racketeering and drug charges.
- October 19 - Judge Carol Irons shot and killed by ex-husband in her Grand Rapids chambers.
- October 21 - Detroit Lions defensive lineman Reggie Rogers charged with three counts of manslaughter in death of three teenagers in traffic accident in Pontiac.

=== November ===
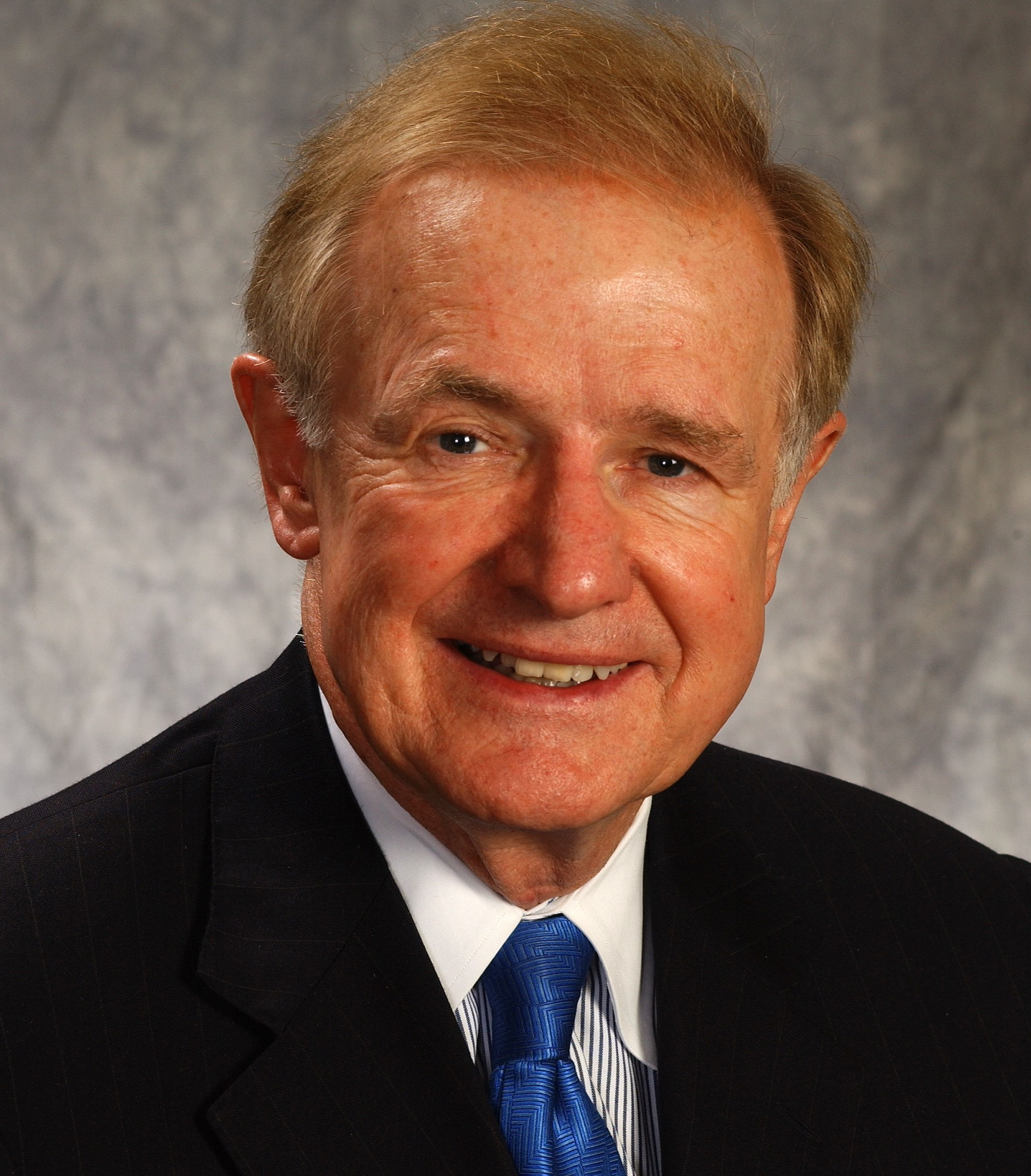
Donald Riegle

- November 1 - "Father Irish", a man who accepted money while posing as a priest at the scene of Northwest Airlines Flight 255, was detained in Canada.
- November 8 - Election day in Michigan:

- George W. Bush defeated Michael Dukakis in Michigan by a margin of 51.5% to 48.5%.
- U.S. Senator Donald Riegle defeated Republican challenger James Whitney Dunn by a margin of 60% to 39%.
- Proposition A banning use of tax funds for abortion for persons receiving public assistance passed by 53% to 47%.

- November 14 - Wayne Fontes hired as head coach of Detroit Lions following firing of Darryl Rogers.
- November 19 - Fox Theatre in Detroit reopened after renovation.
- November 24 - Crowd at 62nd Detroit Thanksgiving Day parade estimated at 900,000.

=== December ===
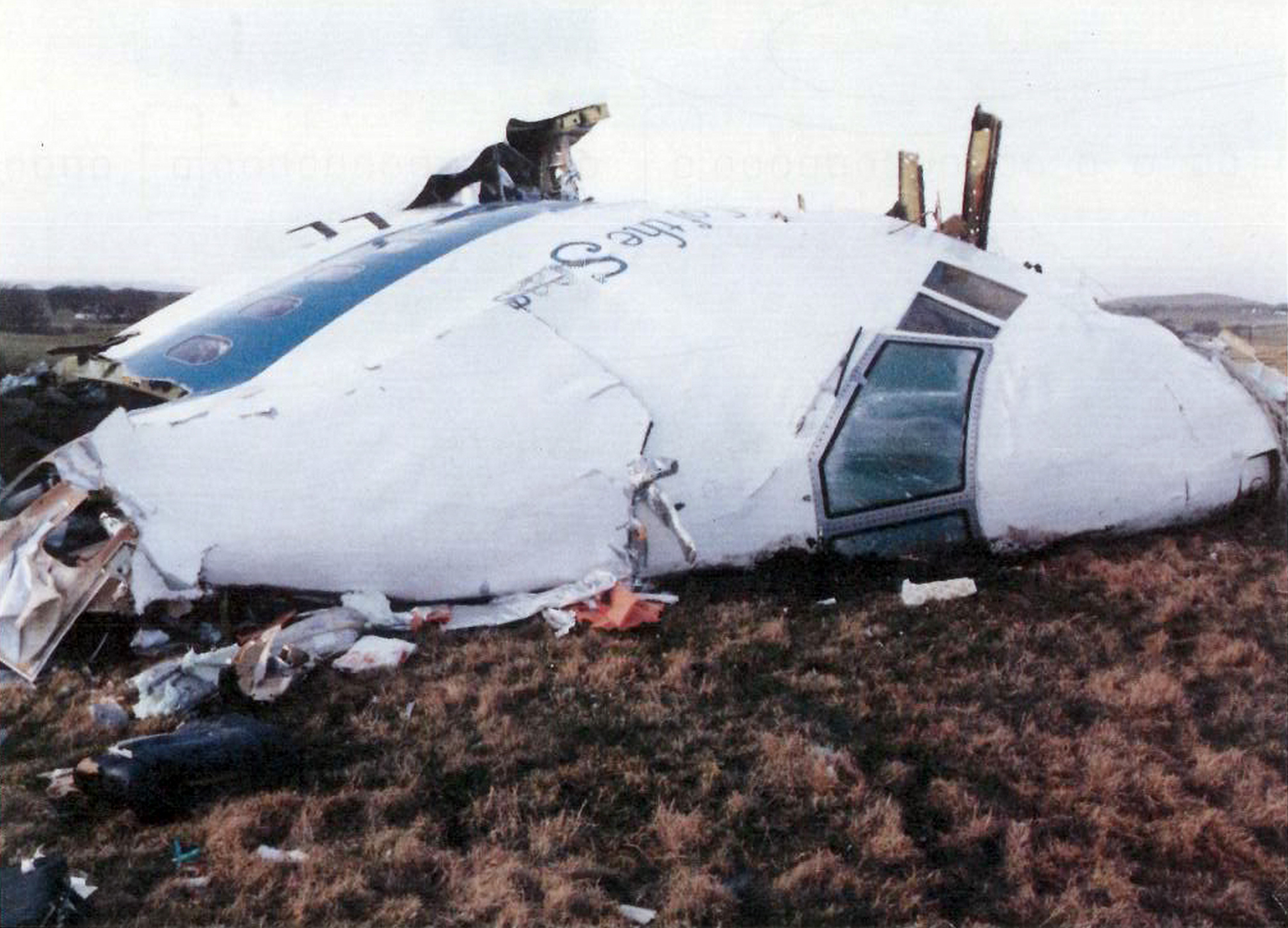
Wreckage of Pan Am Flight 103 in Lockerbie.

- December 14 - Linebacker Mike Cofer and punter Jim Arnold named to the Pro Bowl.
- December 21 - Pan Am Flight 103, en route from Frankfurt to Detroit, was destroyed by a bomb over Lockerbie after a stopover in London. All 243 passengers and 16 crew were killed. Michigan victims included:

- Jim Fuller, 50, vice president in charge of Volkswagen United States;
- Lou Marengo, 33, executive with Volkswagen United States;
- LaWanna Thomas, 21, an Air Force sergeant and her two-month-old son, Jonathan, traveling to spend the holidays with her family in Southfield;
- Arva Anthony Thomas, 17, returning to Detroit from a fall semester studying in West Germany;
- Charles T. Fisher IV, 34, a London banker and son of National Bank of Detroit president Charles "Chick" Fisher;
- Gregory Kosmowski, 40, an executive with Lucas Industries in Troy;
- Pamela Herbert, 19, a Cranbrook graduate who grew up in northwest Detroit, returning from a fall semester studying in London;
- Mary Smith, 34, an Army sergeant from Kalamazoo flying home for Christmas;
- Kenneth Gibson, 20, an Army corporal stationed in Germany returning to spend holidays with family in Romulus;
- Lawrence Bennett, 41, a Parke-Davis manager of clinical research from Lima Township;
- Diane Boatmon-Fuller, 35, a playwright who moved to London in January and was returning for a surprise visit with family; and
- Khalid Jaafar, 21, a Lebanese-American man.
The Four Tops (Levi Stubbs, Duke Fakir, Obie Benson, and Lawrence Payton) were booked on the flight but finished a television taping session in London too late to catch the flight.

== Births ==
- January 10 - Peter Meijer, business analyst and US House of Representatives (2021-23), in Grand Rapids, Michigan
- January 19 - JaVale McGee, basketbal player, in Flint, Michigan
- January 21 - DeShawn Sims, basketball player, in Detroit
- February 5 - Chris Summers, hockey player, in Ann Arbor, Michigan
- February 12 - Mike Posner, singer, rapper, songwriter and producer, in Detroit
- February 21 - Grace Latz, rower, in Jackson, Michigan
- March 9 - Drakkar Klose, mixed martial artist, in Kalamazoo, Michigan
- April 3 - Brandon Graham, football player, in Detroit
- April 5 - Alisha Glass, volleyball player, in Leland, Michigan
- April 11 - Dar Tucker, basketball player, in Saginaw, Michigan
- April 14 - Eric Alexander, soccer player, in Portage, Michigan
- April 15 - Andy Miele, hockey player, in Grosse Pointe Woods, Michigan
- April 21 - Jennifer White Holland, politician, in Detroit
- April 27 - Lizzo, singer, rapper, songwriter, in Detroit
- April 28 - Laurie Pohutsky, politician, in Detroit
- May 1 - Johnathon Jones, basketball player, in Okemos, Michigan
- May 6 - Justin Davis, soccer player, in Southfield, Michigan
- May 13 - Freddie Braun, soccer player, in Royal Oak, Michigan
- May 15 - Nikki Nemitz, softball pitcher, in St. Clair Shores, Michigan
- May 25 - Lee Chatfield, Speaker of the Michigan House of Representatives (2019-2021)
- May 25 - Britta Büthe, volleyball player, in Dearborn, Michigan
- June 21 - Allyssa DeHaan, volleyball player, in Grand Rapids, Michigan
- June 22 - Danny Davis, snowboarder, in Highland, Michigan
- July 24 - Maejor, record producer, songwriter, singer, in Southfield, Michigan
- July 26 - Zach Redmond, hockey player, in Traverse City, Michigan
- July 31 - Kyra Harris Bolden, associate justice of Michigan Supreme Court, in Southfield, Michigan
- August 3 - Ronald Johnson, wide receiver, in Muskegon, Michigan
- August 6 - Jeff Maddux, football lineman, in Monroe, Michigan
- August 8 - Robby Soave, Libertarian journalist, in Detroit
- September 14 - Kirsten Haglund, Miss America 2008, in Farmington Hills, Michigan
- September 18 - Andrew Miller, hockey player, in Bloomfield Hills, Michigan
- September 24 - Steven Kampfer, hockey player, in Ann Arbor, Michigan
- October 28 - Kat Timpf, Libertarian columnist and television personality, in Detroit
- October 28 - Ian Conyers, politician and businessman, in Lansing, Michigan
- November 12 - Mitch Hildebrandt, soccer goalkeeper, in Livonia, Michigan
- December 4 - Justin Meram, soccer player, in Shelby Charter Township
- December 24 - Keith Nichol, football player, in Lowell, Michigan

=== Gallery of 1988 births ===
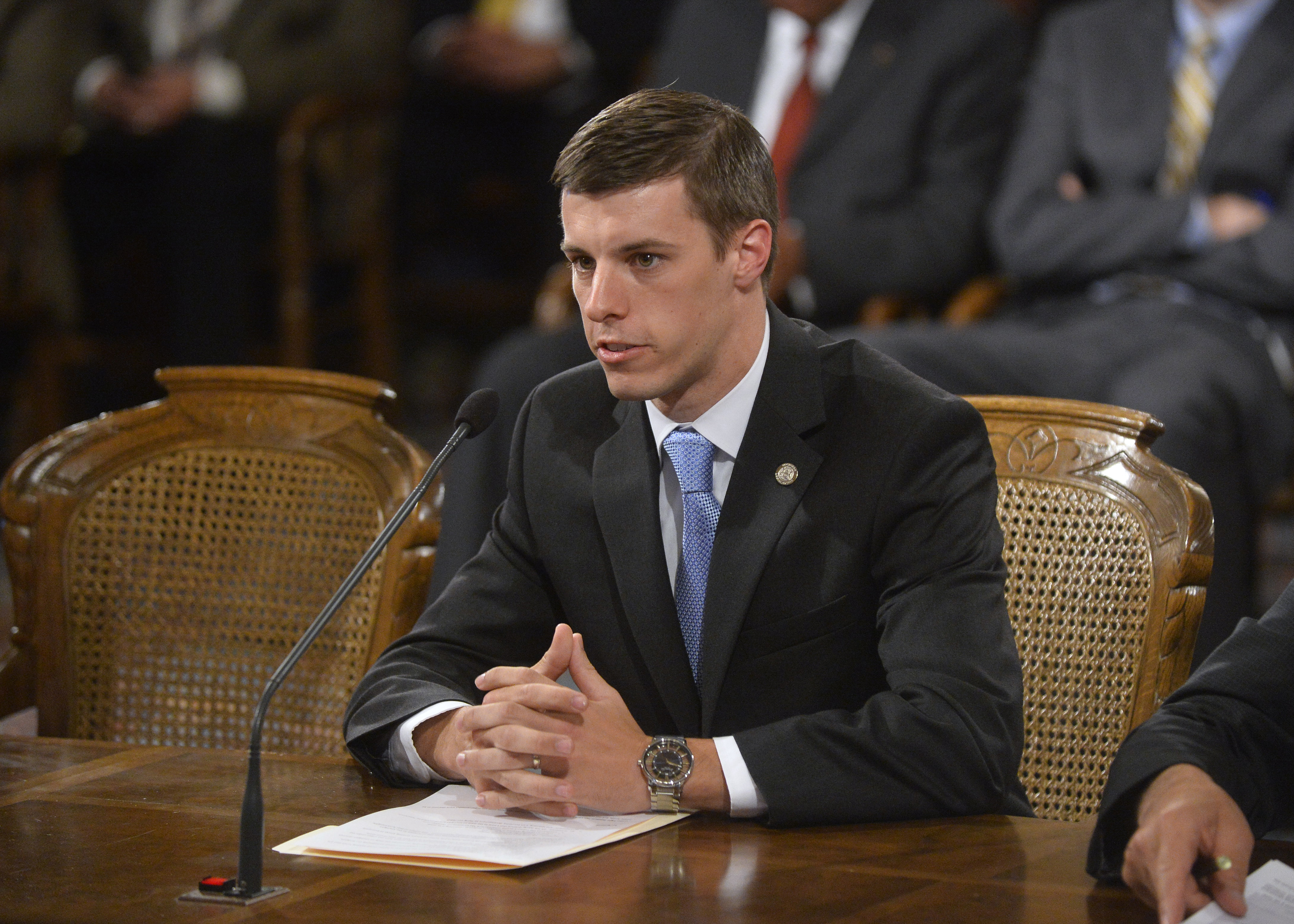
Lee Chatfield

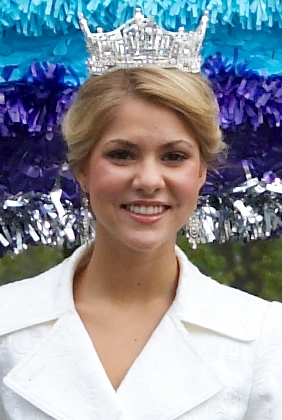
Kirsten Haglund

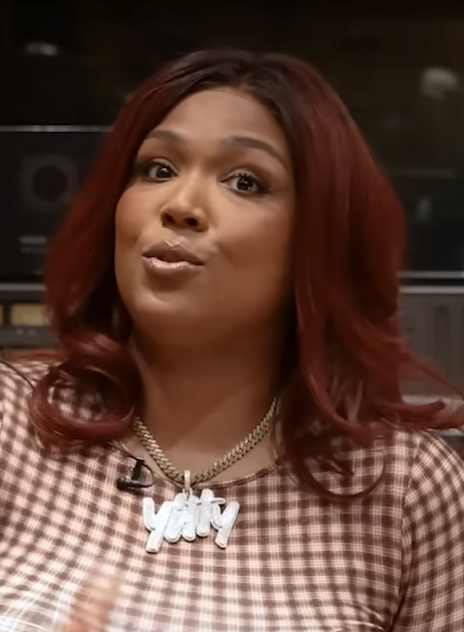
Lizzo

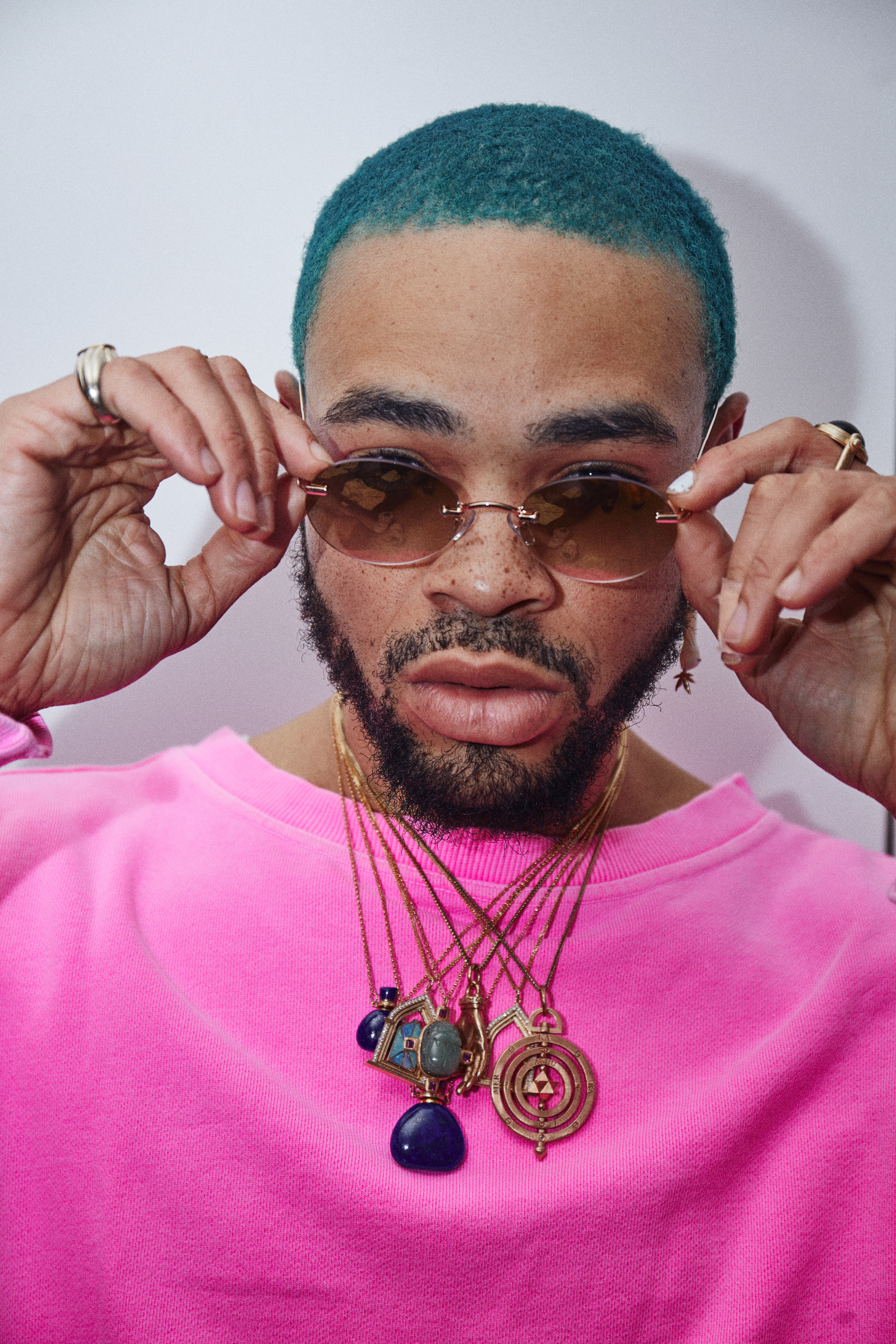
Maejor

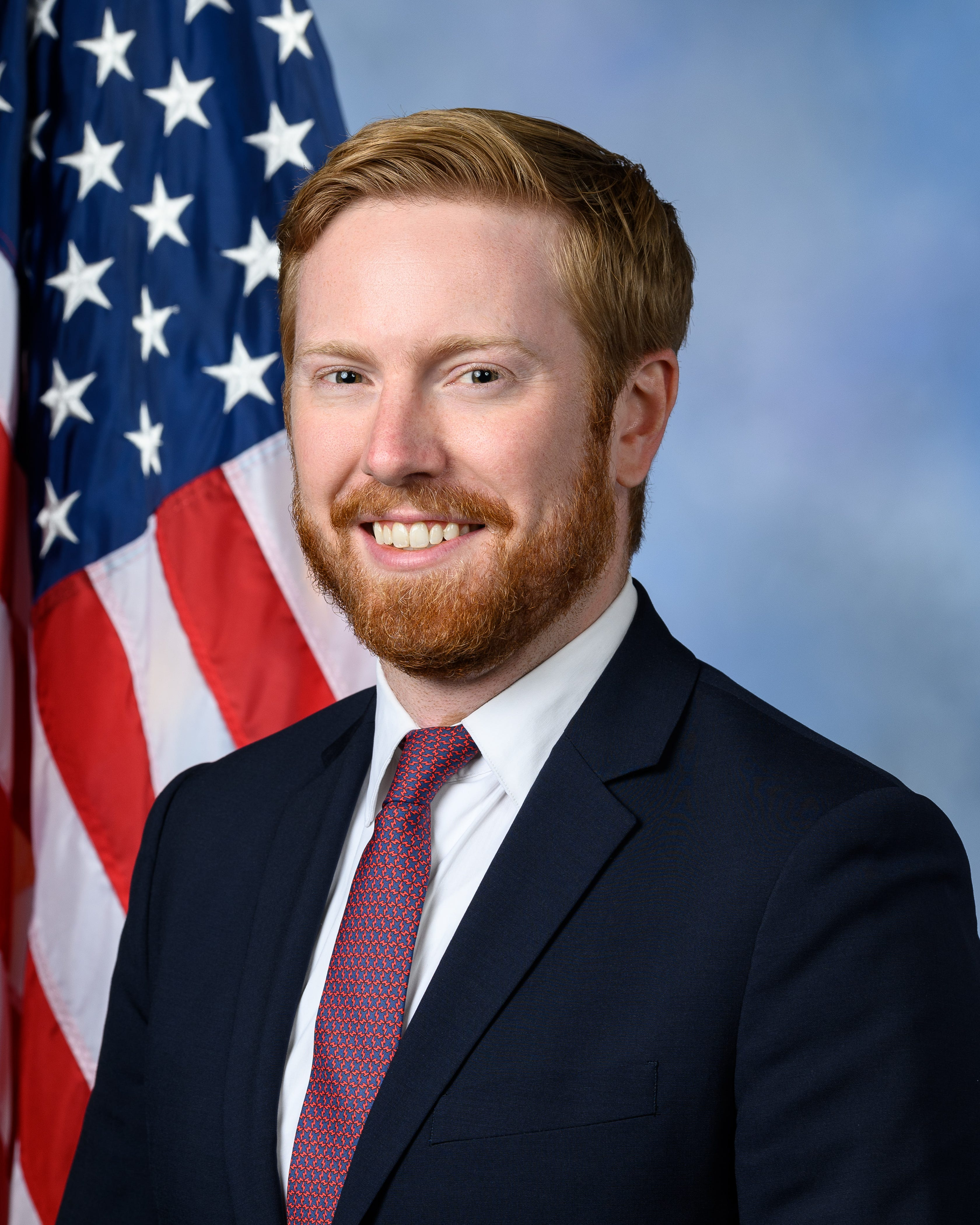
Peter Meijer

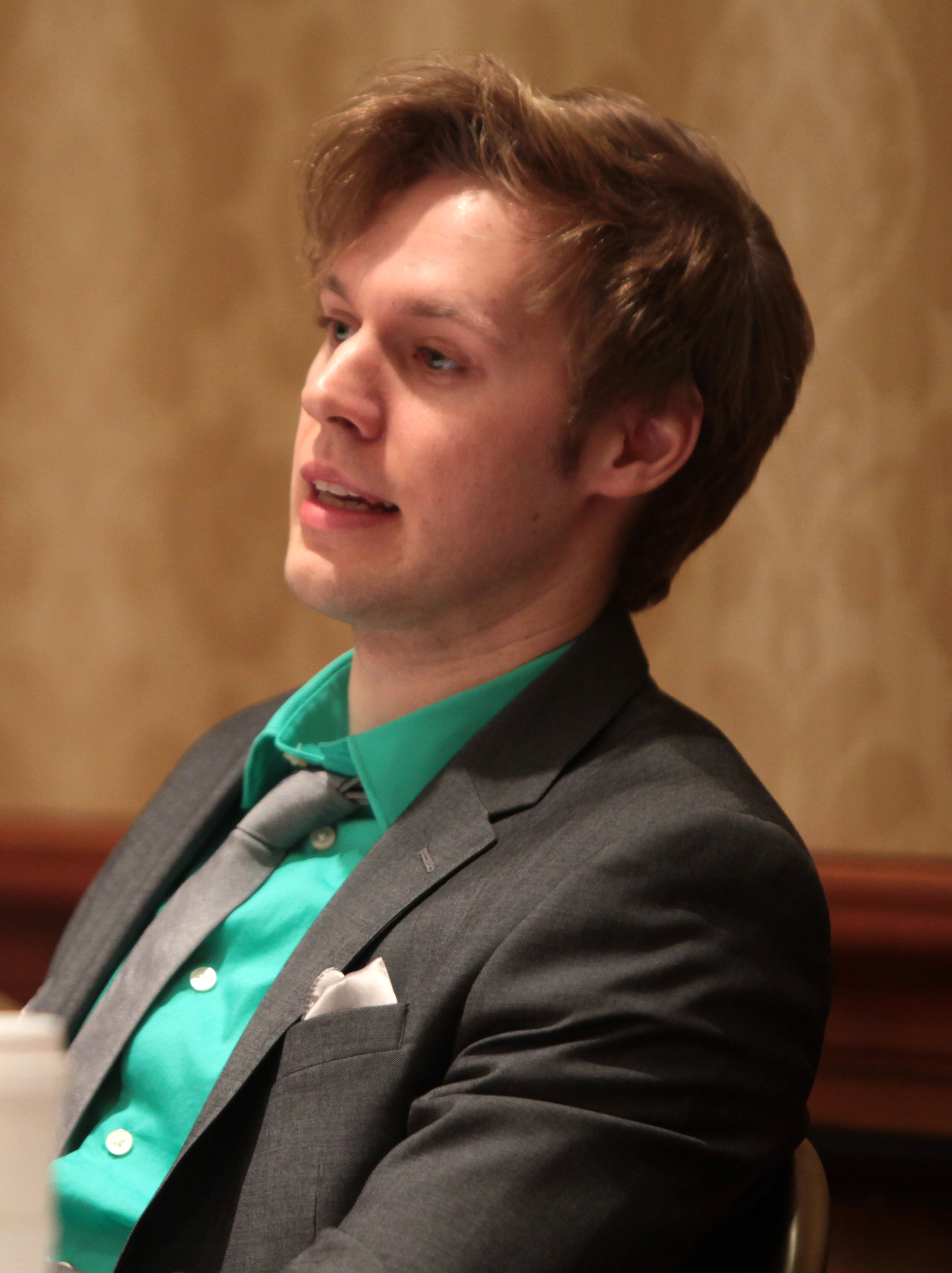
Robby Soave

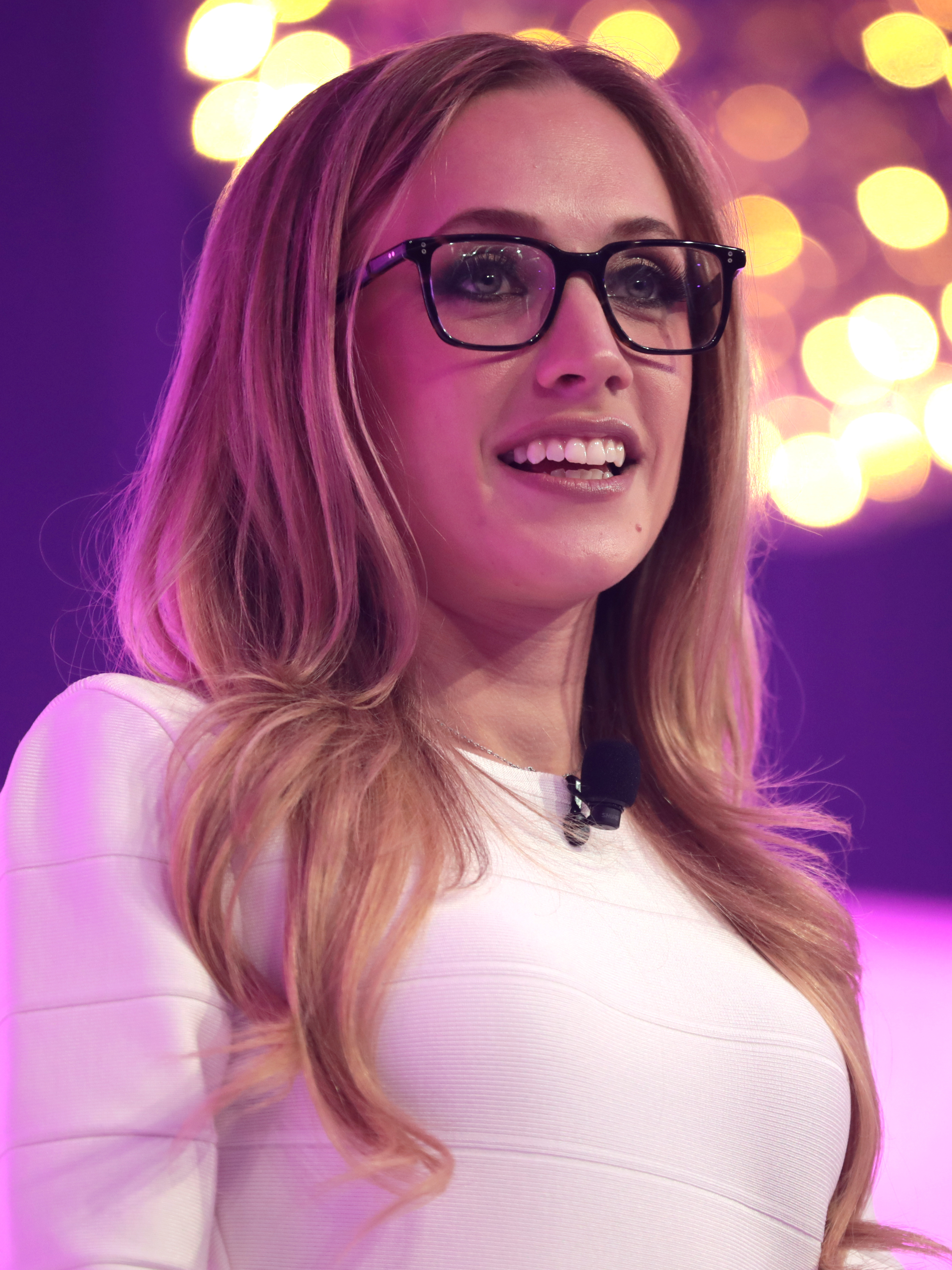
Kat Timpf

== Deaths ==
- January 25 - Colleen Moore, silent movie star of the flapper age, a native of Port Huron, Michigan, in Paso Robles, California
- January 26 - Paul G. Goebel, football player and Mayor of Grand Rapids, in Grand Rapids, Michigan
- February 2 - G. Mennen Williams, Governor of Michigan (1949-1961), at age 76 in Detroit
- February 6 - Nick Pietrosante, football player, in Royal Oak, Michigan
- February 7 - Henry Scripps Booth, civic leader active in Cranbrook Educational Community, at age 90 in Royal Oak
- February 28 - Harvey Kuenn, Detroit Tigers 1952–1959, AL batting champion 1959, in Arizona
- March 24 - Pete Estes, president General Motors 1974-81, in Chicago
- April 1 - Sam Cohodas
- June 16 - Floyd J. McCree, first African-American Mayor of Flint, at age 65
- August 1 - John Dearden, Archbishop of Detroit (1958-1980) and a cardinal from 1969, at age 80 in Southfield, Michigan
- September 12 - Bill Mitchell, GM automobile designer, in Royal Oak, Michigan
- September 27 - J. C. Heard, swing, bop, and blues drummer, at age 71 in Royal Oak, Michigan
- October 19 - Son House, Delta blues musician, in Detroit
- November 13 - Antal Doráti, conductor and composer, conductor of the Detroit Symphony Orchestra (1977–81), at age 82 in Gerzensee, Switzerland
- November 22 - Vic Desjardins, hockey player, in Sault St. Marie, Michigan
- December 12 - Anthony Provenzano, suspect in Jimmy Hoffa kidnapping, in a federal prison in California
- December 20 - Isamu Noguchi, sculptor who designed Detroit's Hart Plaza and its Dodge Fountain, in New York City

=== Gallery of 1988 deaths ===
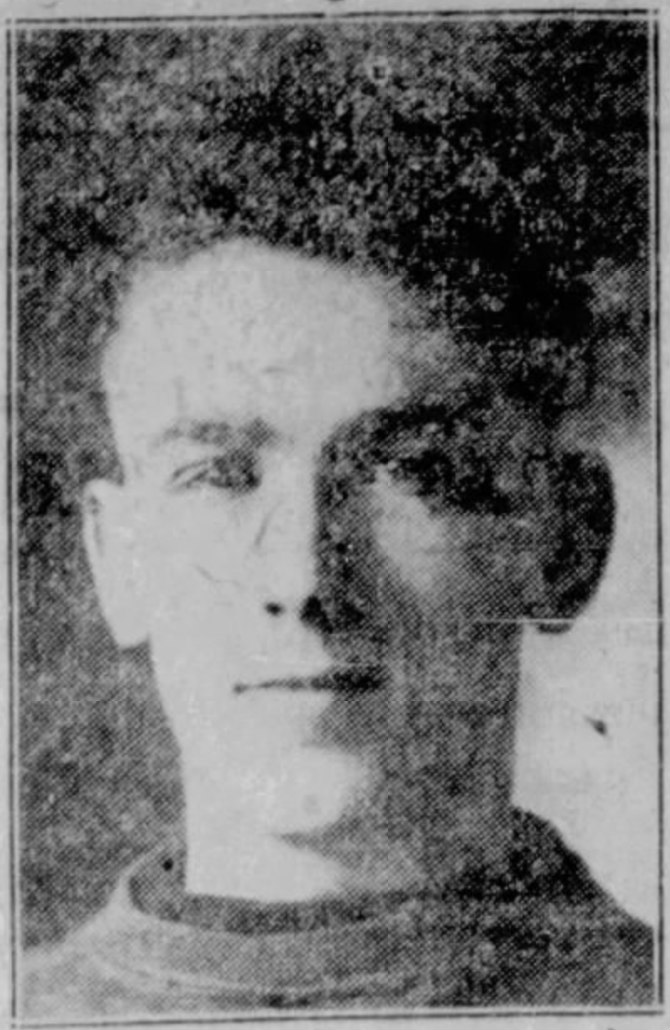
Vic Desjardins

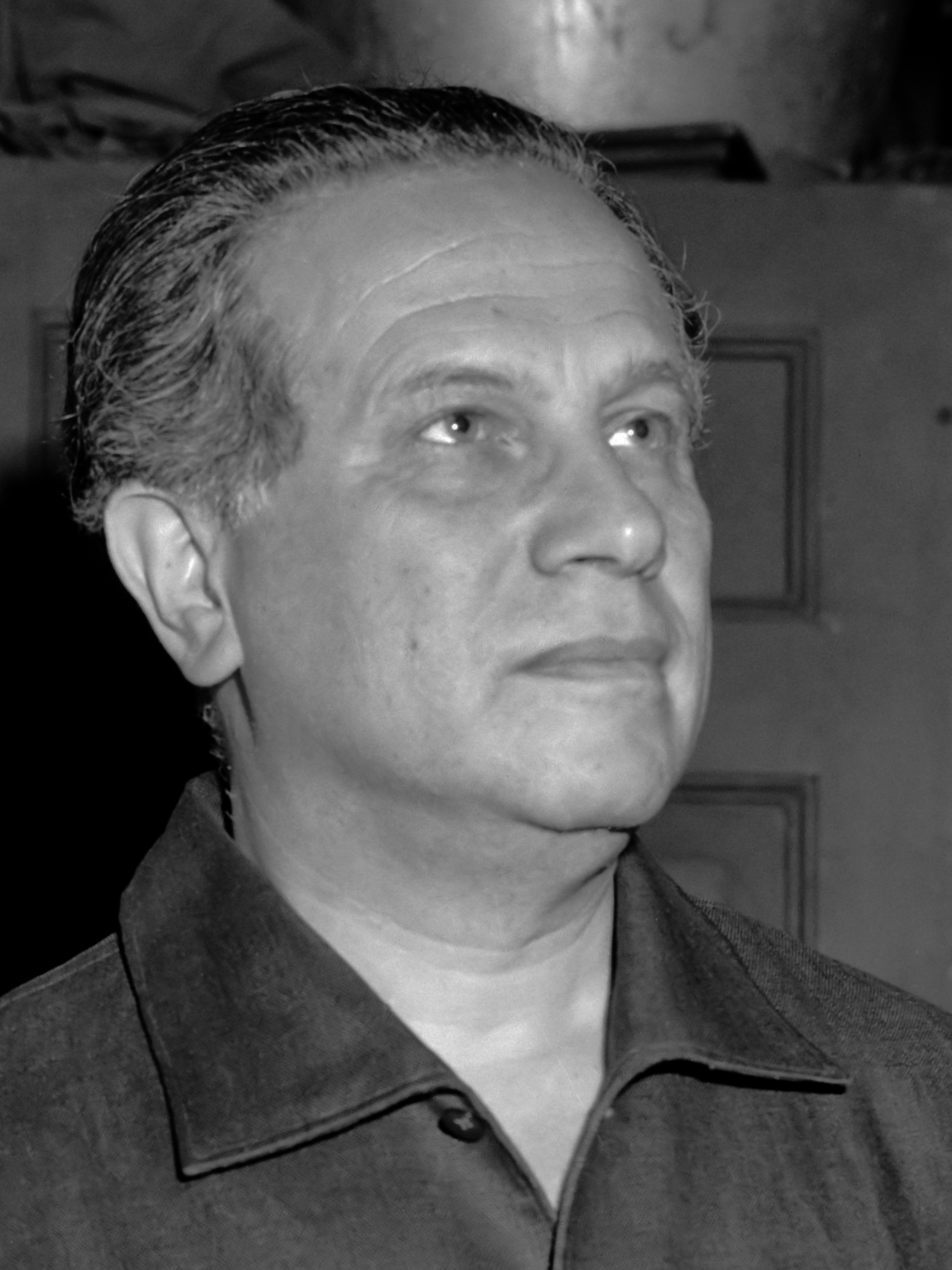
Antal Doráti

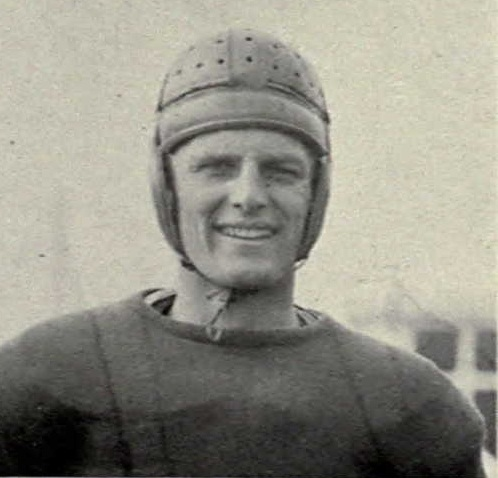
Paul G. Goebel

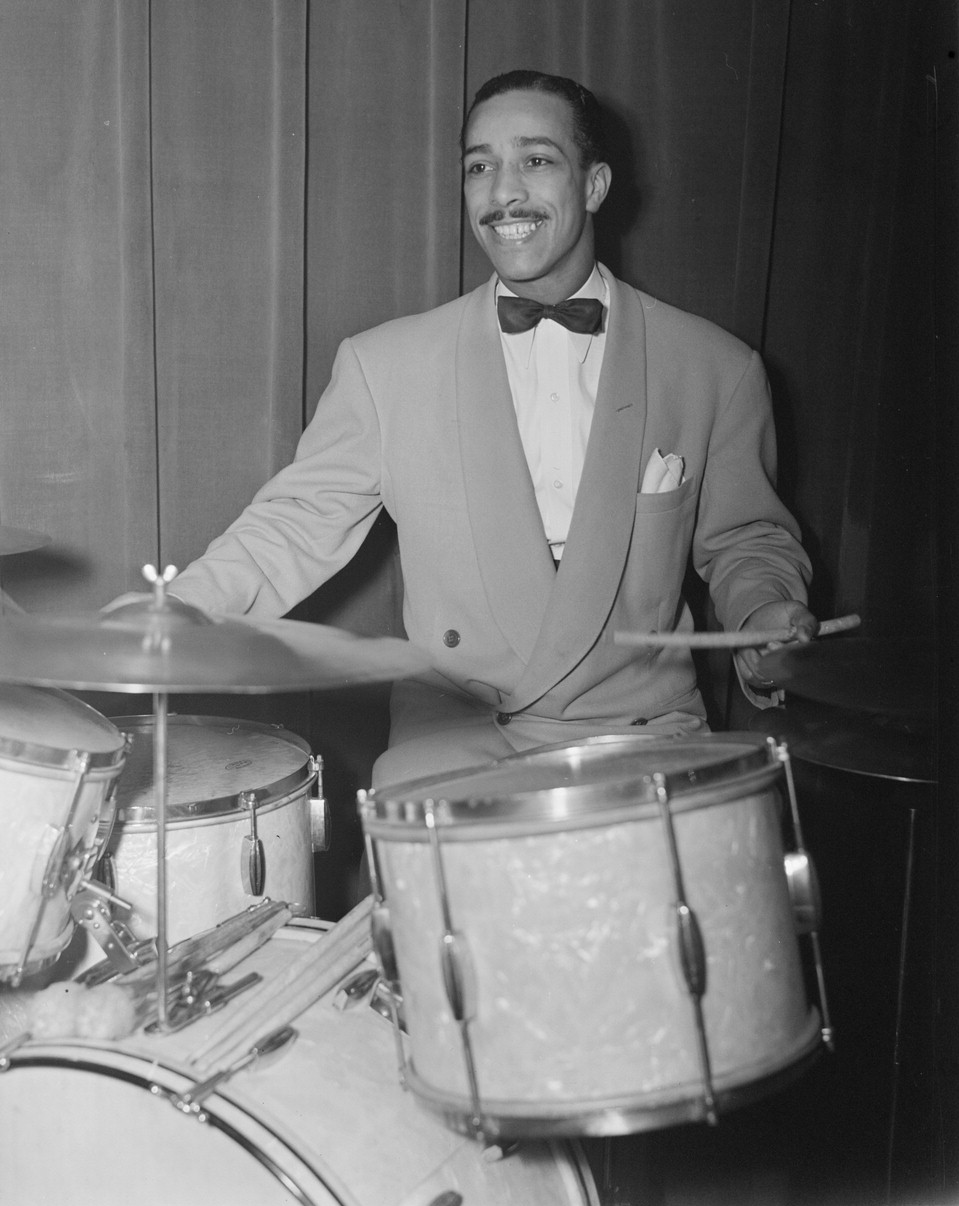
J. C. Heard

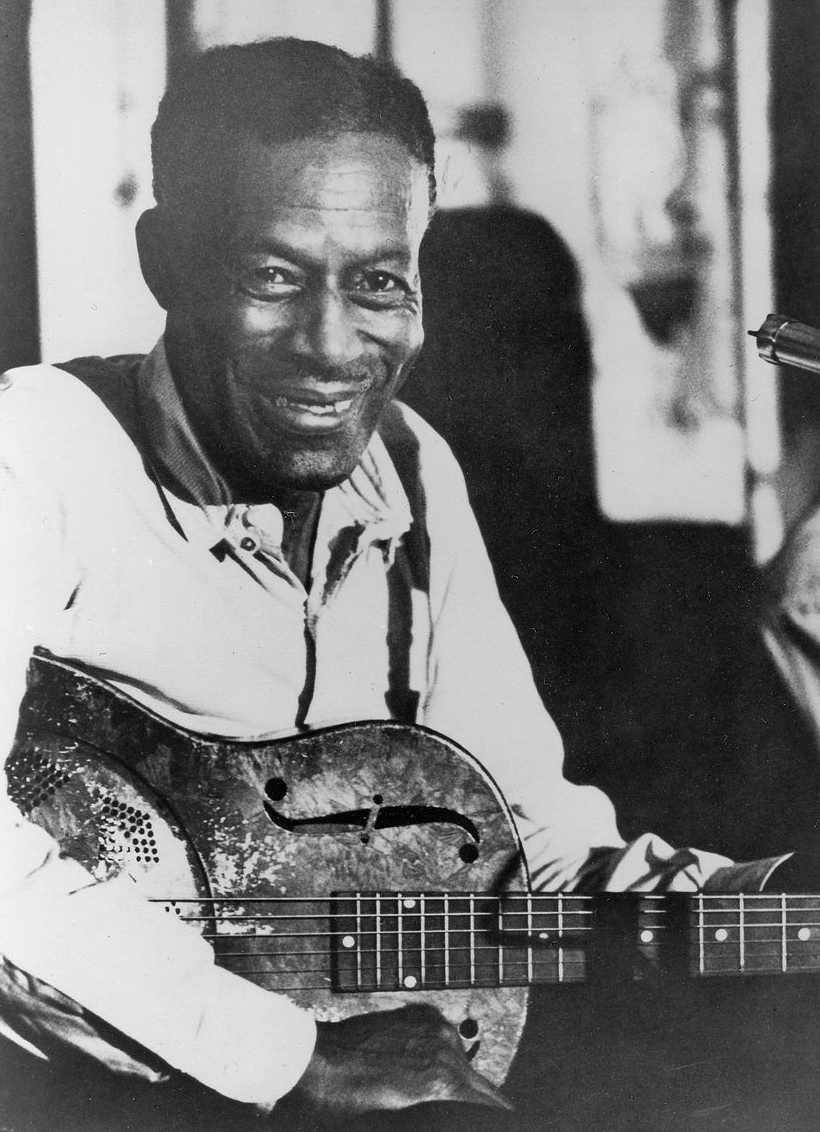
Son House

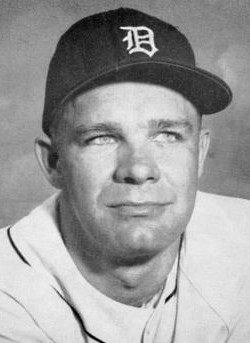
Harvey Kuenn

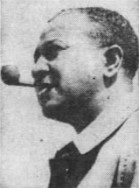
Floyd J. McCree

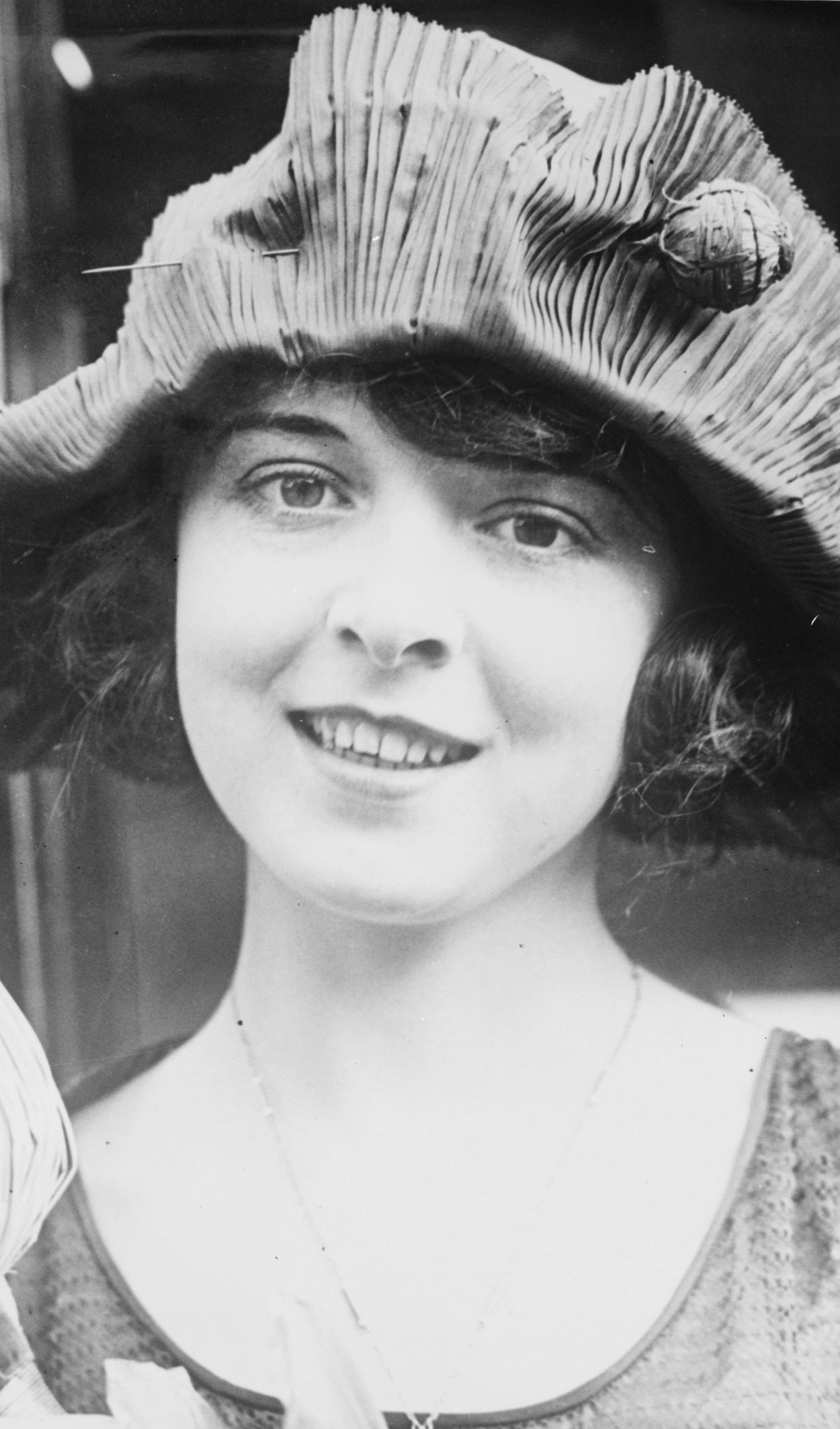
Colleen Moore

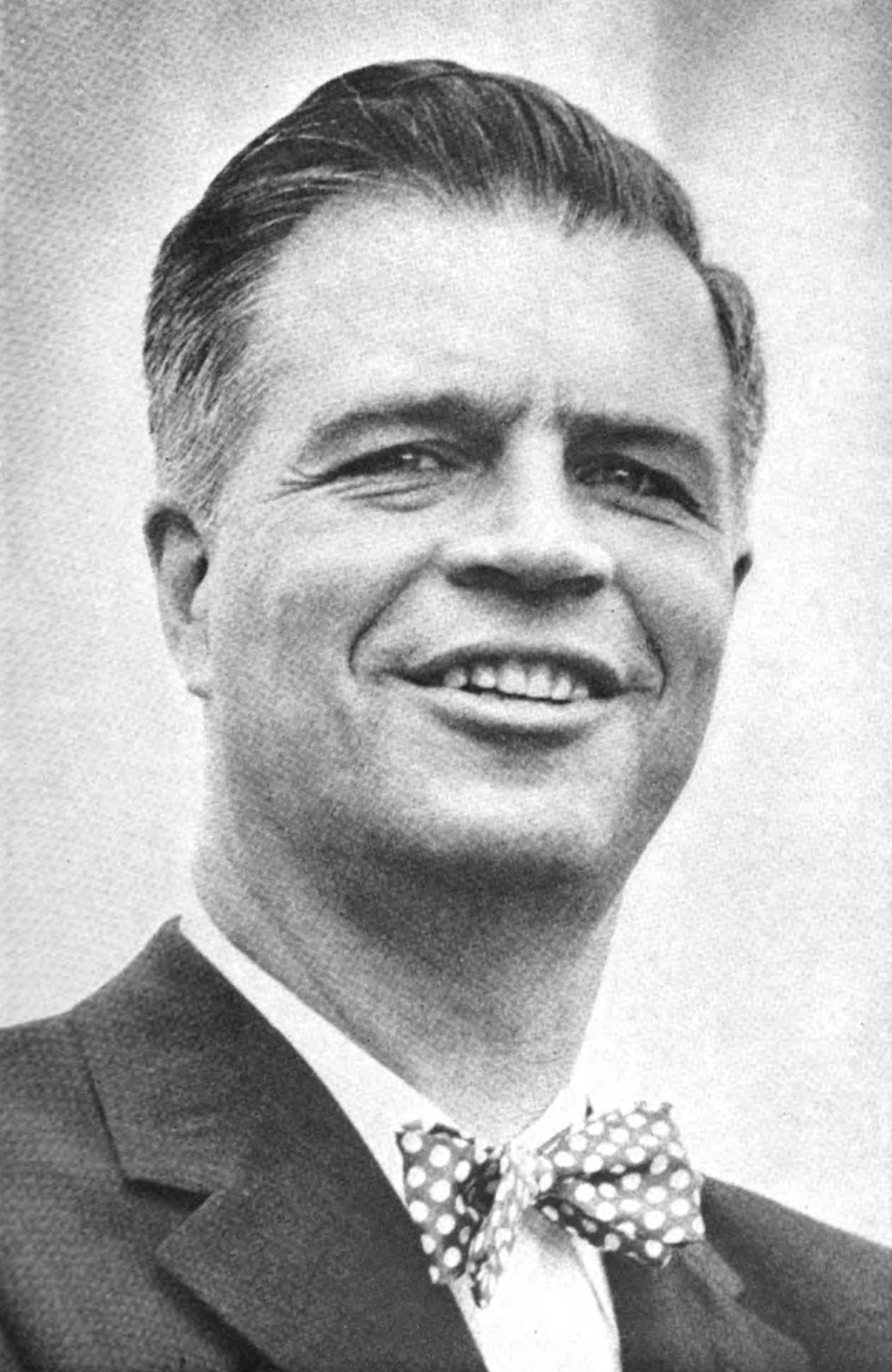
G. Mennen Williams

== See also ==
- History of Michigan
- History of Detroit
