= 1989 in Michigan =

- Decades: 1960s; 1970s; 1980s; 1990s; 2000s
- See also: History of Michigan; Historical outline of Michigan; List of years in Michigan; 1989 in the United States

Events from the year 1989 in Michigan included the murder of the DeLisle children; the battle against the crack cocaine epidemic in Detroit; the Detroit Pistons sweeping the Los Angeles Lakers in the 1989 NBA Finals to win their first NBA championship; interim head coach Steve Fisher leading Michigan to the national championship in the NCAA tournament; Barry Sanders signing with the Detroit Lions; and Madonna's album Like a Prayer and the single of the "same name" both reaching No. 1 on the charts.

== Top Michigan news stories ==
The Associated Press (AP) selected the top stories in Michigan for 1989 as follows:

1. School financing debate, including voters' rejection of two school funding proposals on the November ballot.
2. Efforts to combat drug abuse and trafficking, including the April 2 appointment of attorney Don Reisig as Michigan's "drug czar" and raids on hundreds of suspected crack houses in Detroit.
3. Abortion controversies, including voters' rejection of the use of Medicaid funds for abortion, the Michigan House of Representatives' passage of a bill requiring girls under 18 to obtain parental consent to abortions, and clashes outside Michigan women's clinics.
4. The September 22 drowning death of Leslie Ann Pluhar of Royal Oak after her 1987 Yugo automobile was blown by strong winds over the 38-inch railing of the Mackinac Bridge into the water below.
5. An October 4 proposal by the Michigan Low-Level Radioactive Waste Authority to establish a dumping site for all the low-level nuclear waste from seven states at a site in St. Clair, Lenawee, or Ontonagon County.
6. The U.S. Supreme Court's November 13 deadlock in its review of a lower court ruling approving the joint operating agreement between the Detroit Free Press and The Detroit News. With the legal challenge removed, the newspapers began joint publishing on November 27.
7. First-degree murder charges filed against Lawrence DeLisle in the murder of the DeLisle children after he drove the family station wagon into the Detroit River in Wyandotte, resulting in the deaths of his four children. (DeLisle was found guilty after a trial in June 1990. He was given five life sentences for his actions. His appeals continued for a decade, but the conviction was upheld.)
8. Prison construction to alleviate anticipated overcrowding.
9. The November 29 decision by the U.S. Air Force to place 50 rail-based MX nuclear missiles at Wurtsmith Air Force Base in Oscoda, Michigan. The plan was to base the missiles at Wurtsmith to be deployed by rail across the northeastern lower peninsula in the event of a threat of war.
10. The September 20 conviction in Kent County Circuit Court of nurse's aide Gwendolyn Graham in the 1987 suffocation deaths of five elderly patients at the Alpine Manor Nursing Home in Walker, Michigan, a suburb of Grand Rapids. Graham was ordered to stand trial after her one-time lover and co-worker testified in April to the killings.

== Top Michigan sports stories ==
The AP also conducted a year-end poll of the state's top sports stories with the following ranking as the top ten:

1. Detroit Pistons sweeping the Los Angeles Lakers in the 1989 NBA Finals for the franchise's first NBA championship;
2. Steve Fisher taking over as Michigan's interim head basketball coach two days before the start of the NCAA tournament and leading the Wolverines to the NCAA title.
3. Red Wings left wing Bob Probert being sent to prison after guilty plea for bringing 14 grams of cocaine into the United States in his underpants.
4. Michigan's victory over USC in the 1989 Rose Bowl with Leroy Hoard rushing for 142 yards and two touchdowns.
5. Sparky Anderson going home for a month during the baseball season due to physical and mental exhaustion.
6. Barry Sanders, the 1988 Heisman Trophy winner, was selected by the Detroit Lions with the third pick in the 1989 NFL draft. On September 7, after a lengthy holdout, Sanders signed a $9.3 million, five-year contract with the club. He tallied 1,470 rushing yards in his rookie season and was named NFL Offensive Rookie of the Year.
7. Detroit Lions giving Wayne Fontes a five-year contract and the adoption of a run-and-shoot offense.
8. Michigan won the 1989 Big Ten football championship.
9. Rematch of Thomas Hearns and Sugar Ray Leonard eight years after their 1981 fight.
10. Michigan State's loss to Georgia in the January 1989 Gator Bowl.

Other stories receiving votes included the Detroit Tigers compiling the worst record in Major League Baseball at 59–103 (.364).

== Office holders ==
=== State office holders ===
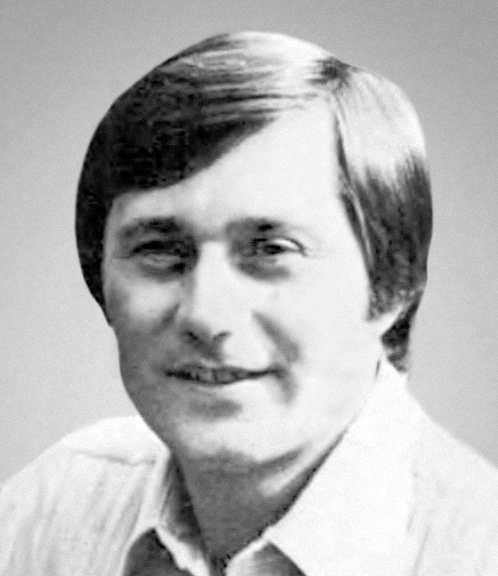
Gov. Blanchard

- Governor of Michigan: James Blanchard (Democrat)
- Lieutenant Governor of Michigan: Martha Griffiths (Democrat)
- Michigan Attorney General: Frank J. Kelley (Democrat)
- Michigan Secretary of State: Richard H. Austin (Democrat)
- Speaker of the Michigan House of Representatives: Lewis N. Dodak (Democrat)
- Majority Leader of the Michigan Senate: John Engler (Republican)
- Chief Justice, Michigan Supreme Court: Dorothy C. Riley

=== Mayors of major cities ===
- Mayor of Detroit: Coleman Young
- Mayor of Grand Rapids: Gerald R. Helmholdt
- Mayor of Warren, Michigan: Ronald L. Bonkowski
- Mayor of Sterling Heights, Michigan: Jean DiRezze Gush
- Mayor of Flint: Matthew S. Collier
- Mayor of Dearborn: Michael Guido
- Mayor of Lansing: Terry John McKane
- Mayor of Ann Arbor: Gerald Jernigan (Republican)
- Mayor of Saginaw: Delbert J. Schrems/Henry H. Nickleberry

=== Federal office holders ===
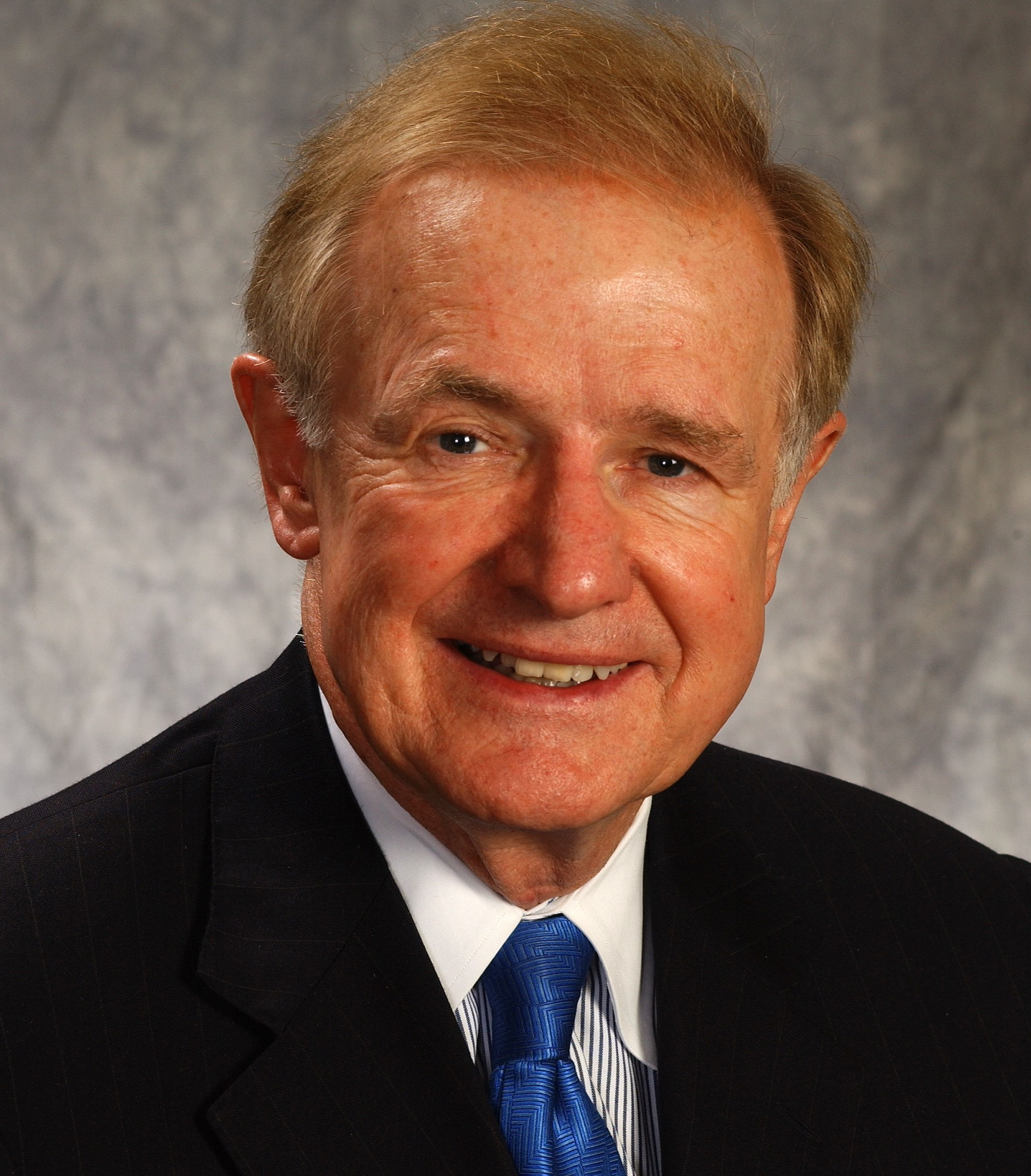
Sen. Riegle

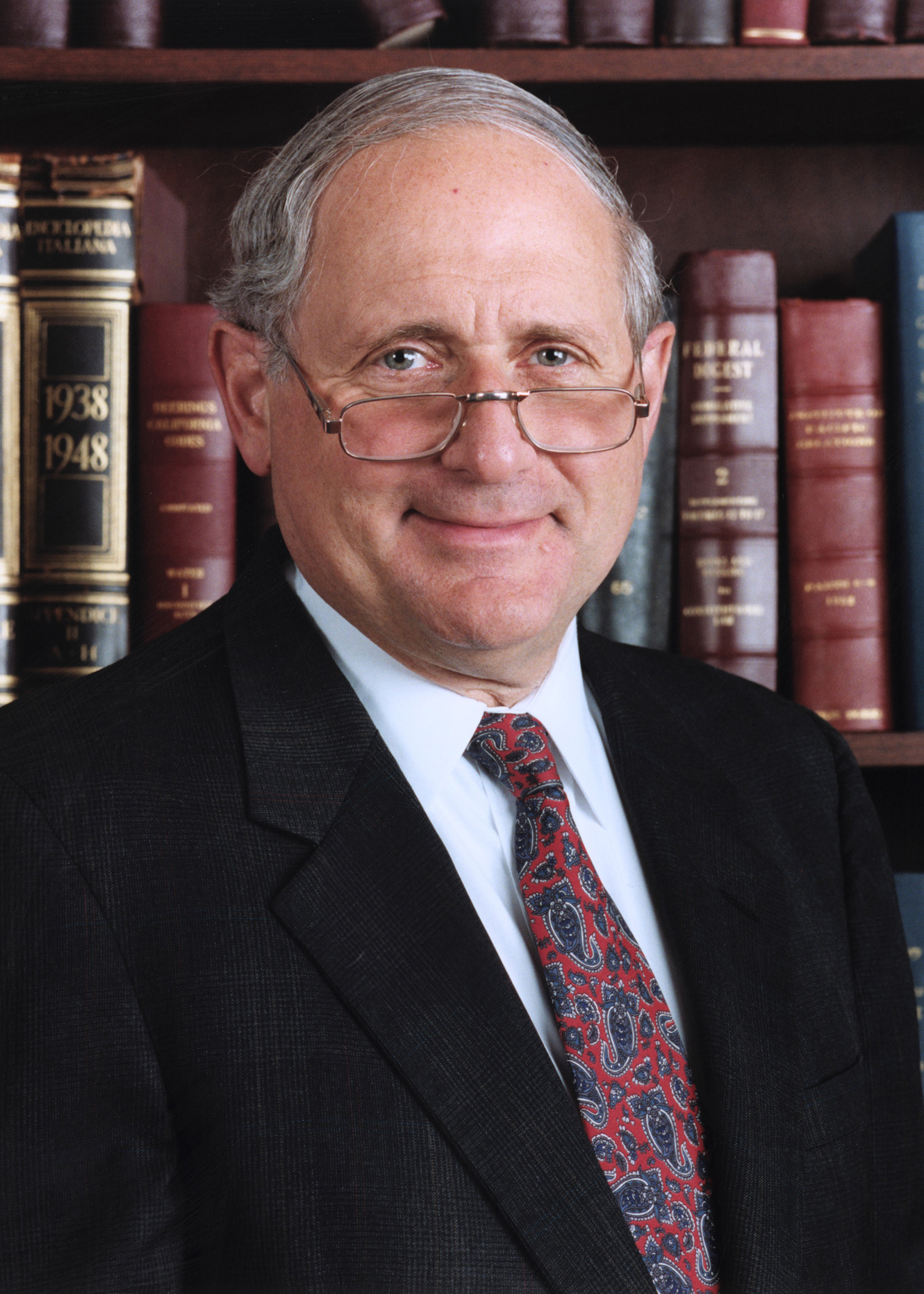
Sen. Levin

- U.S. Senator from Michigan: Donald W. Riegle Jr. (Democrat)
- U.S. Senator from Michigan: Carl Levin (Democrat)
- House District 1: John Conyers (Democrat)
- House District 2: Carl Pursell (Republican)
- House District 3: Howard Wolpe (Republican)
- House District 4: Fred Upton (Republican)
- House District 5: Harold S. Sawyer (Republican)
- House District 6: Bob Carr (Democrat)
- House District 7: Dale Kildee (Democrat)
- House District 8: J. Bob Traxler (Democrat)
- House District 9: Guy Vander Jagt (Republican)
- House District 10: Bill Schuette (Republican)
- House District 11: Robert William Davis (Republican)
- House District 12: David Bonior (Democrat)
- House District 13: George Crockett Jr. (Democrat)
- House District 14: Dennis M. Hertel (Democrat)
- House District 15: William D. Ford (Democrat)
- House District 16: John Dingell (Democrat)
- House District 17: Sander Levin (Democrat)
- House District 18: William Broomfield (Republican)

== Population ==
In the 1980 United States census, Michigan was recorded as having a population of 9,259,000 persons, ranking as the eighth most populous state in the country. By 1990, the state's population had grown only marginally by 0.4% to 9,259,000 persons.

=== Cities ===
The following is a list of cities in Michigan with a population of at least 50,000 based on 1980 U.S. Census data. Historic census data from 1970 and 1990 is included to reflect trends in population increases or decreases. Cities that are part of the Detroit metropolitan area are shaded in tan.

1980 Rank	City	County	1970 Pop.	1980 Pop.	1990 Pop.	Change 1980-90
1	Detroit	Wayne	1,514,063	1,203,368	1,027,974	−14.6% ▼
2	Grand Rapids	Kent	197,649	181,843	189,126	4.0% ▲
3	Warren	Macomb	179,260	161,134	144,864	−10.1% ▼
4	Flint	Genesee	193,317	159,611	140,761	−11.8% ▼
5	Lansing	Ingham	131,403	130,414	127,321	−2.4% ▼
6	Sterling Heights	Macomb	61,365	108,999	117,810	8.1% ▲
7	Ann Arbor	Washtenaw	100,035	107,969	109,592	1.5% ▲
8	Livonia	Wayne	110,109	104,814	100,850	−3.8% ▼
9	Dearborn	Wayne	104,199	90,660	89,286	−1.5%▼
10	Westland	Wayne	86,749	84,603	84,724	0.1% ▲
11	Kalamazoo	Kalamazoo	85,555	79,722	80,277	0.7% ▲
12	Taylor	Wayne	70,020	77,568	70,811	−8.7% ▼
13	Saginaw	Saginaw	91,849	77,508	69,512	−10.3% ▼
14	Pontiac	Oakland	85,279	76,715	71,166	−7.2% ▼
15	St. Clair Shores	Macomb	88,093	76,210	68,107	−10.6% ▼
16	Southfield	Oakland	69,298	75,608	75,745	0.2% ▲
17	Royal Oak	Oakland	86,238	70,893	65,410	−7.7% ▼
18	Dearborn Heights	Wayne	80,069	67,706	60,838	−10.1% ▼
19	Troy	Oakland	39,419	67,102	72,884	8.6% ▲
20	Wyoming	Kent	56,560	59,616	63,891	7.2% ▲
21	Farmington Hills	Oakland	--	58,056	74,611	28.5% ▲
22	Roseville	Macomb	60,529	54,311	51,412	−5.3% ▼
23	East Lansing	Ingham	47,540	51,392	50,677	−1.4% ▼

=== Counties ===
The following is a list of counties in Michigan with populations of at least 100,000 based on 1980 U.S. Census data. Historic census data from 1970 and 1990 are included to reflect trends in population increases or decreases. Counties that are part of the Detroit metropolitan area are shaded in tan.

1980 Rank	County	Largest city	1970 Pop.	1980 Pop.	1990 Pop.	Change 1980-90
1	Wayne	Detroit	2,666,751	2,337,891	2,111,687	−9.7% ▼
2	Oakland	Pontiac	907,871	1,011,793	1,083,592	7.1% ▲
3	Macomb	Warren	625,309	694,600	717,400	3.3% ▲
4	Genesee	Flint	444,341	450,449	430,459	−4.4% ▼
5	Kent	Grand Rapids	411,044	444,506	500,631	12.6% ▲
6	Ingham	Lansing	261,039	275,520	281,912	2.3% ▲
7	Washtenaw	Ann Arbor	234,103	264,748	282,937	6.9% ▲
8	Saginaw	Saginaw	219,743	228,059	211,946	−7.1% ▼
9	Kalamazoo	Kalamazoo	201,550	212,378	223,411	5.2% ▲
10	Berrien	Benton Harbor	163,875	171,276	161,378	−5.8% ▼
11	Muskegon	Muskegon	157,426	157,589	158,983	0.9% ▲
12	Ottawa	Holland	128,181	157,174	187,768	19.5% ▲
13	Jackson	Jackson	143,274	151,495	149,756	−1.1% ▼
14	Calhoun	Battle Creek	141,963	141,557	135,982	−3.9% ▼
15	St. Clair	Port Huron	120,175	138,802	145,607	4.9% ▲
16	Monroe	Monroe	118,479	134,659	133,600	−0.8% ▼
17	Bay	Bay City	117,339	119,881	111,723	−6.8% ▼
18	Livingston	Howell	58,967	100,289	115,645	15.3% ▲

== Sports ==
=== Baseball ===
- 1989 Detroit Tigers season – Under manager Sparky Anderson, the Tigers compiled a 59–103 record and finished seventh in American League East. The team's statistical leaders included Keith Moreland with a .299 batting average, Lou Whitaker with 28 home runs and 85 RBIs, Mike Henneman with 11 wins, and Frank Tanana with a 3.58 earned run average.
- 1989 Michigan Wolverines baseball team – Under head coach Bud Middaugh, the Wolverines compiled a 49–16 record.

=== American football ===
- 1989 Detroit Lions season – Under head coach Wayne Fontes, the Lions compiled a 7–9 record and finished third in the NFC Central Division. The team's statistical leaders included Bob Gagliano with 1,671 passing yards, Barry Sanders with 1,470 rushing yards, Richard Johnson with 1,091 receiving yards, and Eddie Murray with 96 points scored.
- 1989 Detroit Drive season – Under head coach Tim Marcum, the Drive compiled a 3–1 record and won ArenaBowl III on August 18 at Joe Louis Arena in Detroit.
- 1989 Michigan Wolverines football team – Under head coach Bo Schembechler, the Wolverines compiled a 10–2 record, lost to USC in the 1990 Rose Bowl, and were ranked No. 7 in the final AP Poll. The team's statistical leaders included Michael Taylor with 1,081 passing yards, Tony Boles with 839 rushing yards, Greg McMurtry with 711 receiving yards, and J. D. Carlson with 73 points scored.
- 1989 Michigan State Spartans football team – Under head coach George Perles, the Spartans compiled an 8–4 record and were ranked No. 16 in the final AP Poll. The team's statistical leaders included Dan Enos with 2,066 passing yards, Blake Ezor with 1,299 rushing yards and 114 points scored, and Courtney Hawkins with 1,080 receiving yards.
- 1989 Eastern Michigan Hurons football team – Under head coach Jim Harkema, the Hurons compiled a 7–3–1 record.
- 1989 Central Michigan Chippewas football team – Under head coach Herb Deromedi, the Chippewas compiled a 5–5–1 record.
- 1989 Western Michigan Broncos football team – Under head coach Al Molde, the Broncos compiled a 5–6 record.

=== Basketball ===
- 1988–89 Detroit Pistons season – Under head coach Chuck Daly, the Pistons compiled a 63–19 record, finished first in the NBA's Central Division, beat the Celtics and Bulls in the playoffs, and swept the Los Angeles Lakers, four games to none, in the 1989 NBA Finals. The team's statistical leaders included Isaiah Thomas with 1,458 points and 663 assists and Bill Laimbeer with 776 rebounds.
- 1988–89 Michigan Wolverines men's basketball team – The Wolverines compiled a 30–7 and won the national championship at the 1989 NCAA Division I men's basketball tournament. The team's statistical leaders included Glen Rice with 949 points, Rumeal Robinson with 233 assists, and Loy Vaught with 296 rebounds. Glen Rice was named the NCAA Final Four Most Outstanding Player and the Big Ten Player of the Year. Bill Frieder, who had announced his decision to become head coach at Arizona State, was dismissed before the NCAA Tournament and replaced by assistant Steve Fisher.
- 1988–89 Michigan State Spartans men's basketball team – Under head coach Jud Heathcote, the Spartans compiled an 18–15 record. Guard Steve Smith led the team in scoring (585 points) and rebounds (229); Ken Redfield led the team with 131 assists.

=== Ice hockey ===
- 1988–89 Detroit Red Wings season – Under head coach Jacques Demers, the Red Wings compiled a 34–34–12 record and finished first in the NHL Norris Division. Steve Yzerman led the team with 65 goals, 90 assists, and 155 points. The team's goaltenders were Greg Stefan (46 games) and Glen Hanlon (39 games).
- 1988–89 Michigan Wolverines men's ice hockey team – Under head coach Red Berenson, the Wolverines compiled a 22–15–4 record.

=== Other ===
- 1988–89 Michigan Wolverines softball team – Under head coach Carol Hutchins, the team compiled a 42–20 record.
- 1989 U.S. Women's Open – Betsy King won the championship which was held at Indianwood Golf and Country Club in Orion Township, Michigan.
- Detroit Turbos – Under head coach Medo Martinello, the Turbos compiled a 6–2 record in the inaugural season of the Major Indoor Lacrosse League. Gary Gait was selected as the league's rookie of the year.

== Music and culture ==
- March 1989 – Madonna's album Like a Prayer was released and reached No. 1 on the Billboard album chart. The album featured hit songs "Like a Prayer" (No. 1), "Express Yourself" (No. 2), "Cherish" (No. 2), and "Keep It Together" (No. 8).
- May 1989 – Aretha Franklin's Through the Storm was released. The single "Through the Storm", a duet with Elton John, reached No. 16 on the Billboard Hot 100.
- May 1989 – Bob Seger's remake of Fats Domino's "Blue Monday" was released on the Road House soundtrack album and reached No. 40 on the US Mainstream Rock chart.
- June 1989 – Diana Ross' album Workin' Overtime was released. The title track Workin' Overtime reached No. 3 on the Billboard R&B Singles chart.
- July 1989 – Alice Cooper's album Trash was released and reached No. 20 on the Billboard album chart. The single "Poison" reached No. 7 on the Billboard Hot 100.
- 1989 – The Insane Clown Posse's first single, "Party at the Top of the Hill", was released.

== Companies ==
The following is a list of major companies based in Michigan having at least $500 million in sales in 1989.

Company	1989 sales (millions)	1989 net earnings (millions)	Headquarters	Core business
General Motors	126,974	4,224	Detroit	Automobiles
Ford Motor Company	96,932	3,835	Dearborn	Automobiles
Chrysler	36,156	359	Highland Park	Automobiles
Dow Chemical Company	17,730	2,487	Midland	Chemicals
Whirlpool Corporation	6,318	187	Benton Harbor	Home appliances
Kellogg Co.	4,662	470	Battle Creek	Cereal products
Detroit Edison	3,200	389	Detroit	Electric utility
Masco	3,150	221	Taylor	Home improvement and construction products
Upjohn	2,900	176	Kalamazoo	Pharmaceutical
Steelcase	1,800	na	Grand Rapids	Furniture
Clark Equipment Company	1,433	69	Buchanan	Industrial and construction machinery and equipment
Gerber Products Company	1,190	81	Fremont	Baby food
Federal-Mogul	1,084	33	Southfield	automotive, commercial, aerospace, marine, rail and off-road vehicles
Herman Miller	799	45	Zeeland	Furniture
La-Z-Boy	556	27	Monroe	Furniture
Haworth	>500	na	Holland	Furniture
Consumers Power			Jackson	Natural gas utility

== Chronology of events ==
=== January ===
- January 2 – Michigan defeated USC, 22–14, in the 1989 Rose Bowl
- January 3 – Amid mounting problems and dwindling support, Arthur Jefferson announced he would step down as superintendent of Detroit schools.
- January 5 – The Ford Thunderbird SC was named Motor Trend's domestic car of the year.
- January 8 – Cardinal Edmund Szoka announced revised church closure plan, sparking some parishes.
- January 8 – Over 100,000 persons attend the Detroit Auto Show, the largest single-day attendance in history.
- January 9 – Reagan's budget proposal called for 1991 closure of General Dynamics Warren tank plant.
- January 11 – Former UM and Olympic diver Bruce Kimball pleaded guilty in vehicular alcohol/manslaughter case. He was sentenced to 17 years.
- January 21 – 56 arrested at protest at Detroit abortion clinic.
- January 25 – General Momtors vice chairman Donald Atwood appointed as the No. 2 official in the Department of Defense.
- January 27 – US Court of Appeal approved the joint operarting agreement between The Detroit News and Detroit Free Press.

=== February ===
- February 5 – Steve Yzerman scored his 50th goal of the season.
- February 7 – Farmer Jack announced that its 37 Detroit area Q&P stores would be renamed following merger.
- February 8 – Tiger Stadium listed on the National Register of Historic Places.
- February 15 – Detroit Pistons trade Adrian Dantley for Mark Aguirre
- February 22 – Detroiter Anita Baker won two Grammy Awards for best R&B song and best female R&B performance.
- February 23 – Chrysler announced construction of new Jeep plant on Jefferson Avenue in Detroit.

=== March ===
- March 4 – Alan Trammell signed the biggest contract in Detroit Tigers history, paying $6.5 million for three years.
- March 4 – Bob Probert suspended indefinitely from the NHL following drug-smuggling arrest.
- March 5 – Madonna's "Like a Prayer" video banned in Italy.
- March 9 – William Clay Ford retired as Ford chairman.
- March 15 – Bill Frieder accepted position as Arizona State basketball coach. Michigan AD Bo Schembechler announced Frider would not be permitted to coacch Michigan in the NCAA tournament. Assistant coach Fischer tabbed as interim coach.
- Members of the Chambers crack cocaine ring imprisoned.
- March 25 – Michigan defeated Virginia to advance to Final Four.

=== April ===
- April 3 – Michigan wins championship game at NCAA basketball tournament.

== Births ==
- January 4 – Joe Barksdale, American football player, in Detroit
- February 20 – Jack Falahee, actor (How to Get Away with Murder, Mercy Street), in Ann Arbor, Michigan
- February 21 – Ian Cole, professional ice hockey player, in Ann Arbor
- March 22 – Tyler Oakley, YouTuber, television host, author and activist, in Jackson, Michigan
- April 14 – Kayla Pedersen, WNBA forward, in Flint, Michigan
- May 24 – Grace Luczak, rower and 3x world championship gold medalist, in Royal Oak, Michigan
- October 2 – Kristina and Karissa Shannon, glamour models, Playboy Playmates, and twin sisters, in Ann Arbor
- December 20 – Jennifer Song, professional golfer, in Ann Arbor
- December 21 – Mark Ingram II, American football player and 2009 Heisman Trophy winner who grew up and played high school football in Flint, in Hackensack, New Jersey

=== Gallery of 1989 births ===
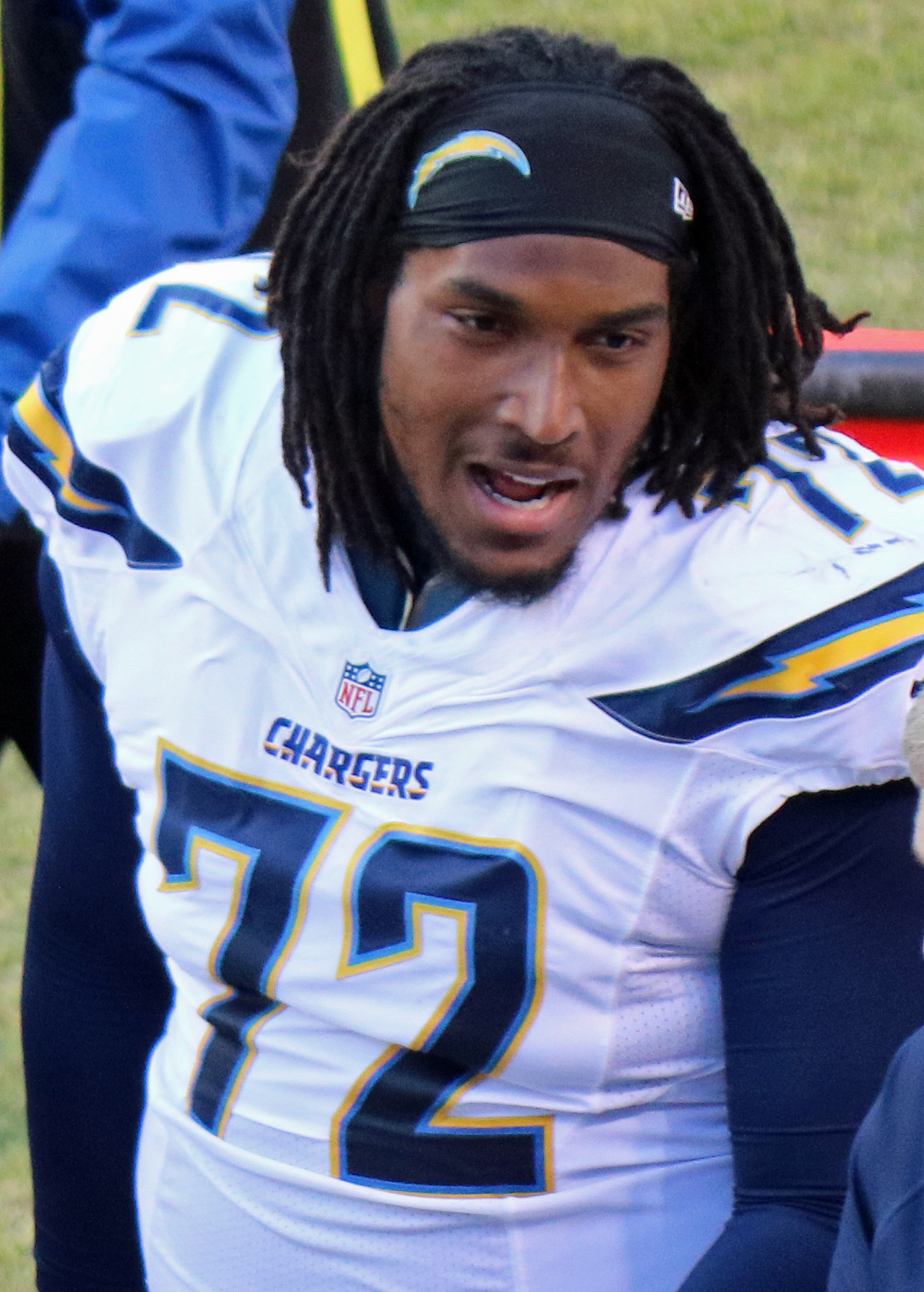
Joe Barksdale

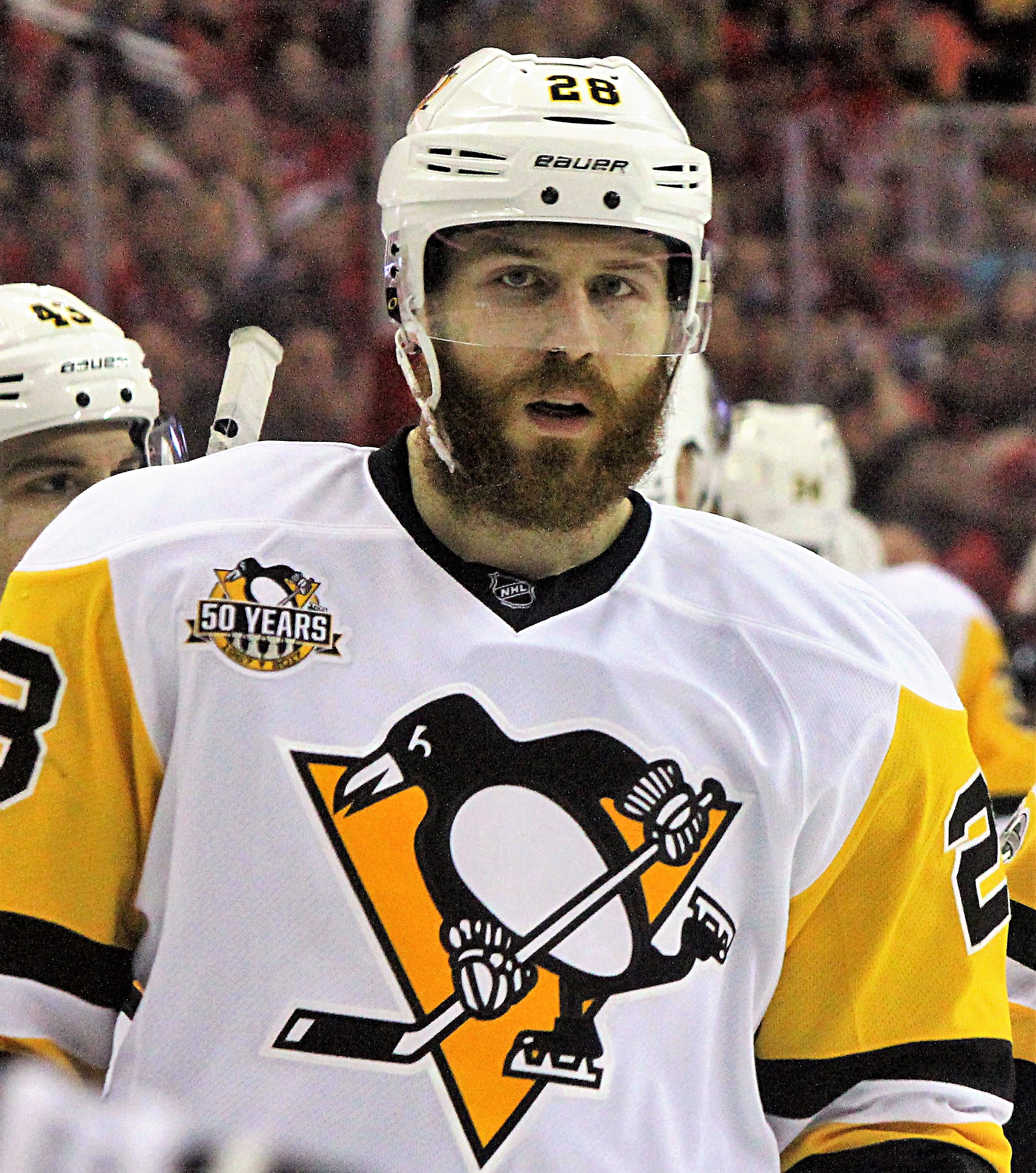
Ian Cole

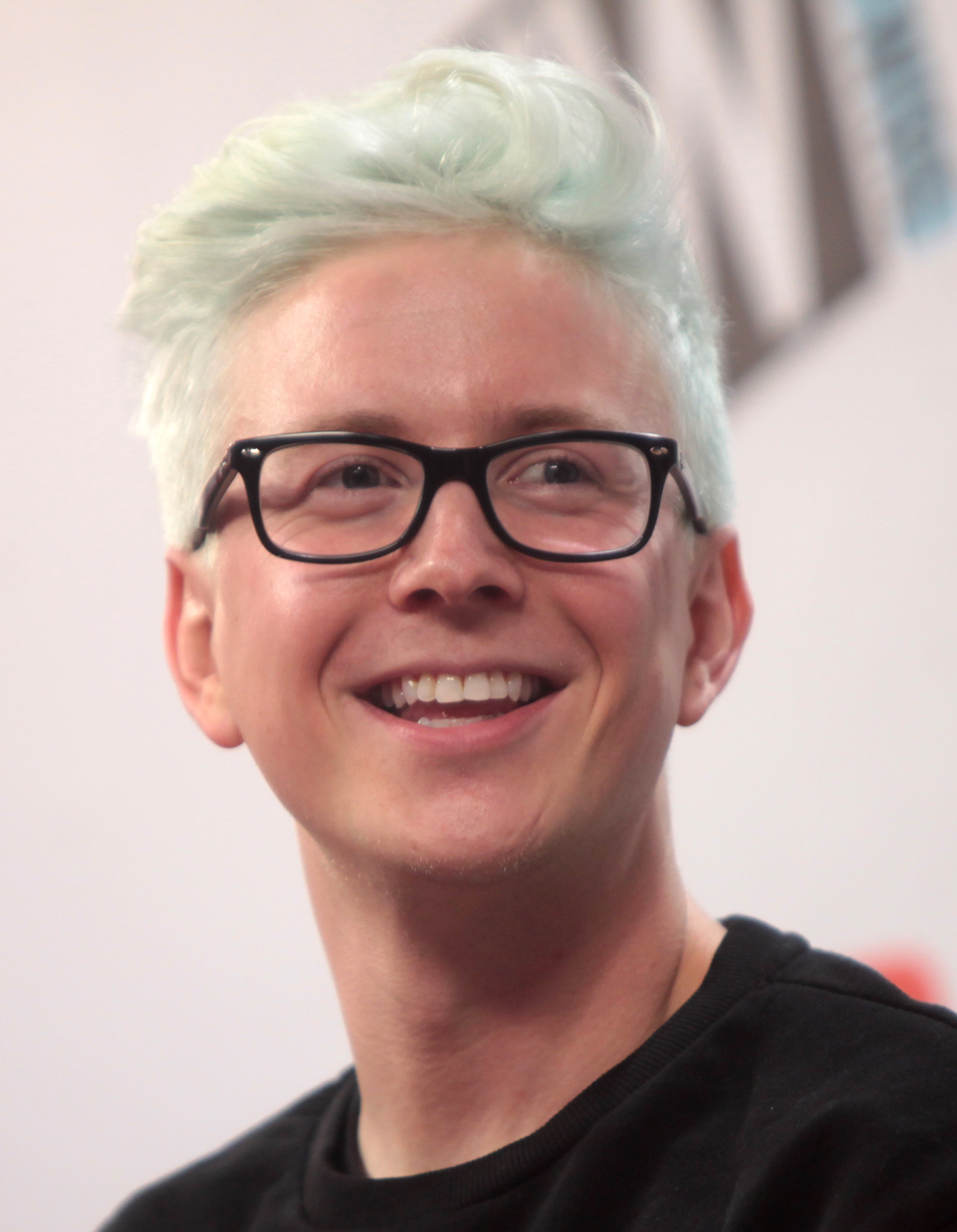
Tyler Oakley

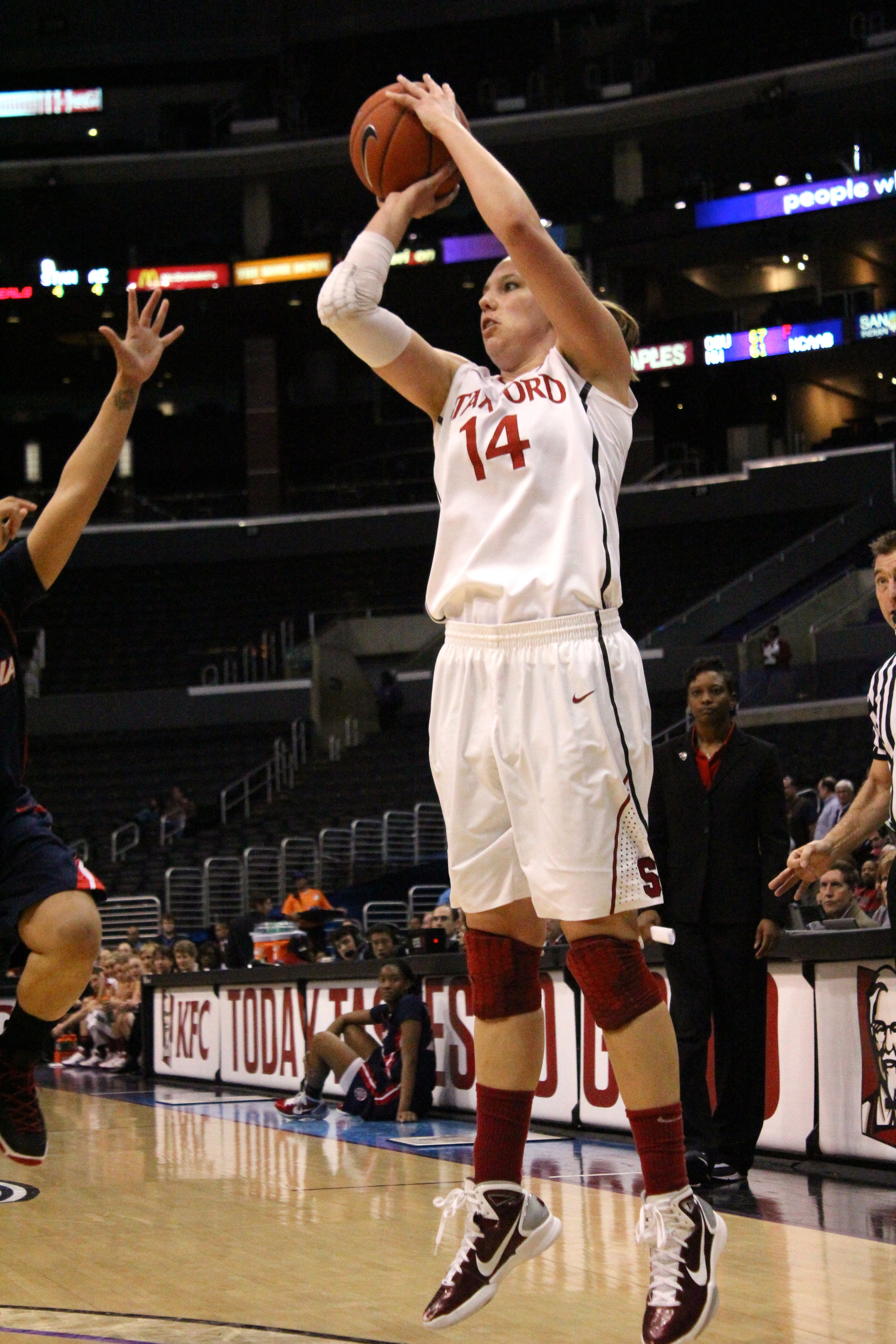
Kayla Pedersen

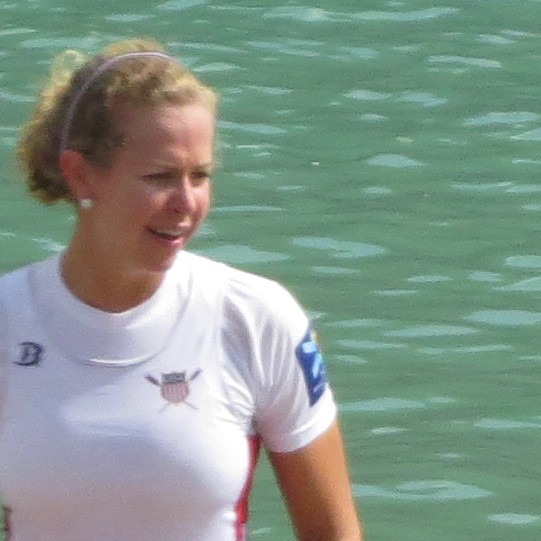
Grace Luczak

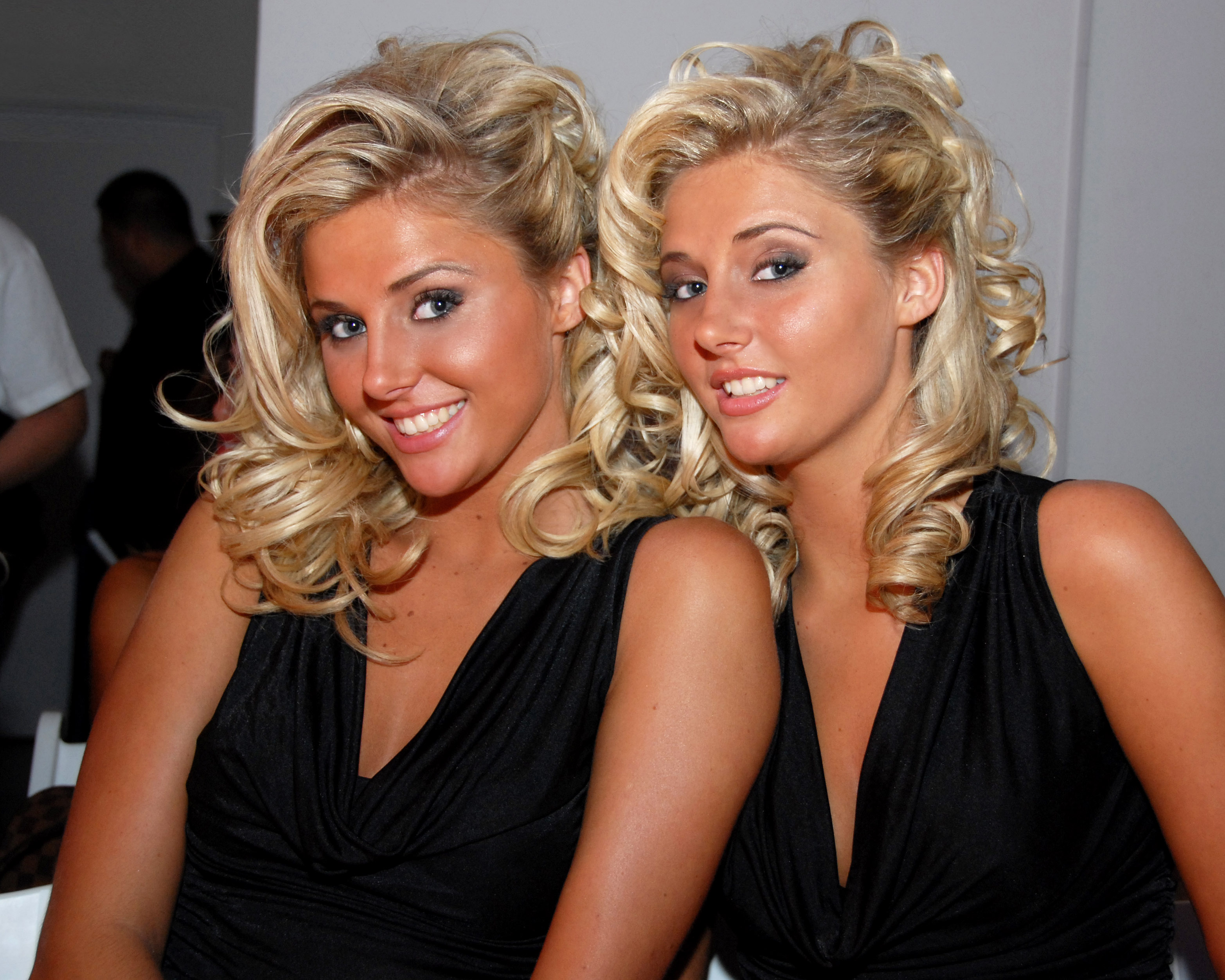
Kristina and Karissa Shannon

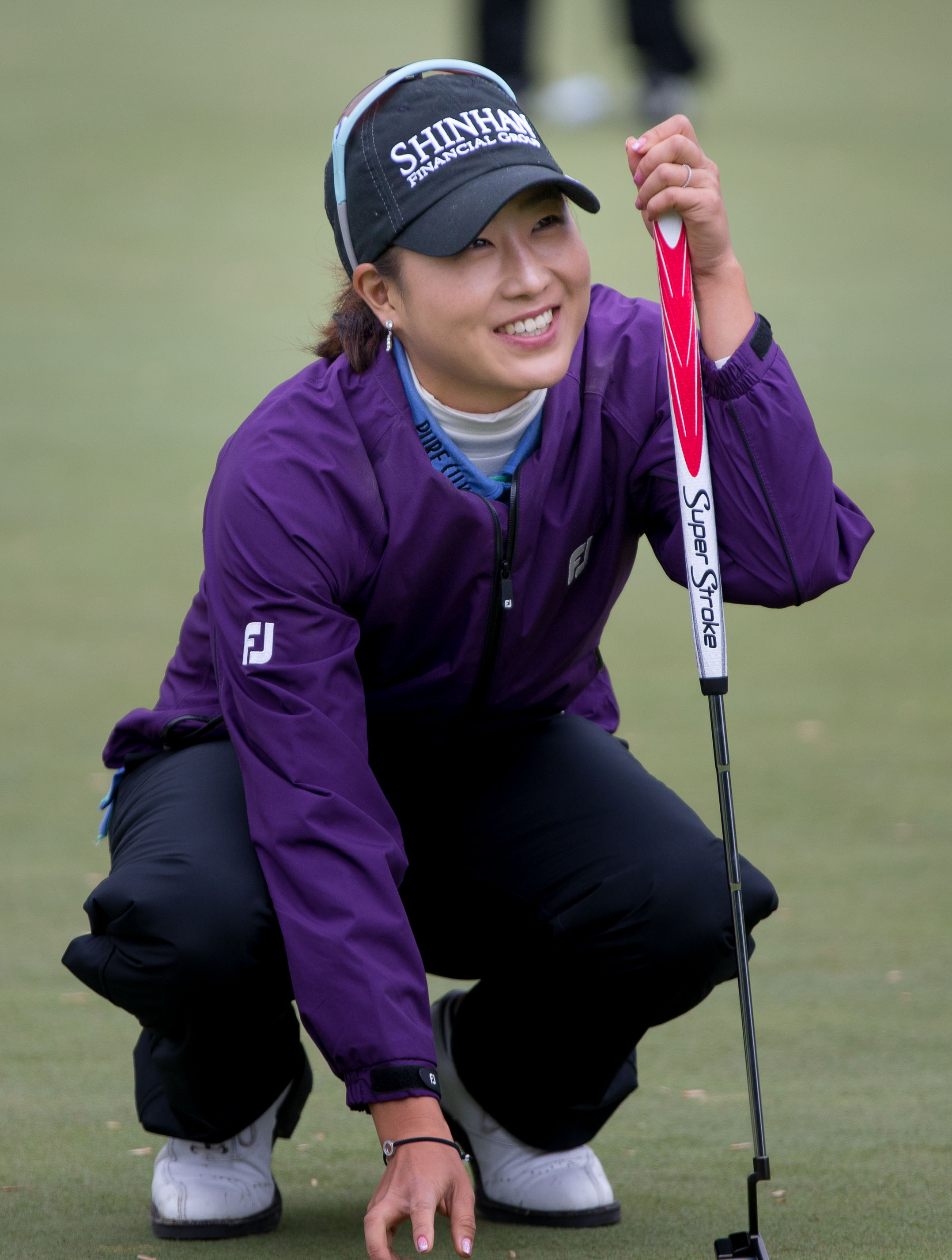
Jennifer Song

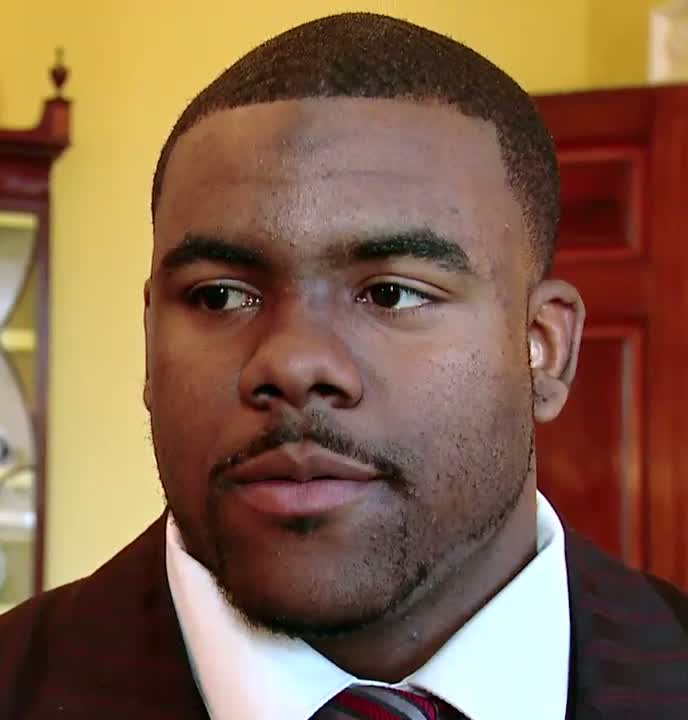
Mark Ingram II

== Deaths ==
- February 2 – Oliver Sipple, Vietnam vet and Detroit native who stopped Sarah Jane Moore from shooting Gerald Ford, at age 47 in San Francisco
- March 13 – James G. O'Hara, represented Michigan's 7th and 12th Districts in the House of Representatives (1959–1977), at age 63 in Washington, D.C.
- April 6 – Elizabeth Becker-Pinkston, gold medalist in diving at 1924 and 1928 Summer Olympics, at age 86 in Detroit
- April 12 – Sugar Ray Robinson, professional boxer who grew up in Detroit, at age 67 in Los Angeles
- April 26 – Lucille Ball, actress and comedian who lived in Wyandotte, Michigan, for a portion of her childhood, at age 77 in Los Angeles
- May 20 – Gilda Radner, comedian, actress, and Detroit native, at age 42 in Los Angeles
- May 28 – Ralph Crego, Mayor Lansing from 1943 to 1961, at age 95 in East Lansing, Michigan
- June 7 – Jim Cristy, swimmer and bronze medalist at 1932 Summer Olympics, at age 76 in Kalamazoo
- July 2 – Wilfrid Sellars, philosopher, developer of critical realism, Ann Arbor native, and U-M alumnus, at age 77 in Pittsburgh
- September 22 – Bob Calihan, University of Detroit basketball coach (1948–1969) and namesake of Calihan Hall, at age 71
- October 8 – Edward Woods, actor (The Public Enemy) and native of Menominee, MI, at age 86 in Van Nuys, California
- December 25 – Billy Martin, manager of the Detroit Tigers (1971–1973), at age 61 in Johnson City, New York
- December 26 – Doug Harvey, ice hockey legend who won the Norris Trophy seven times and played for the Detroit Red Wings during the 1966–67 season, at age 65 in Montreal

=== Gallery of 1989 deaths ===
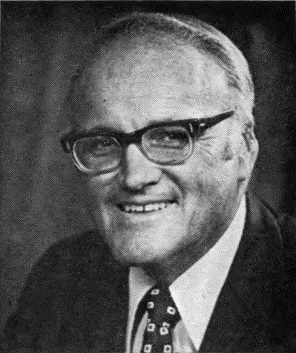
James G. O'Hara

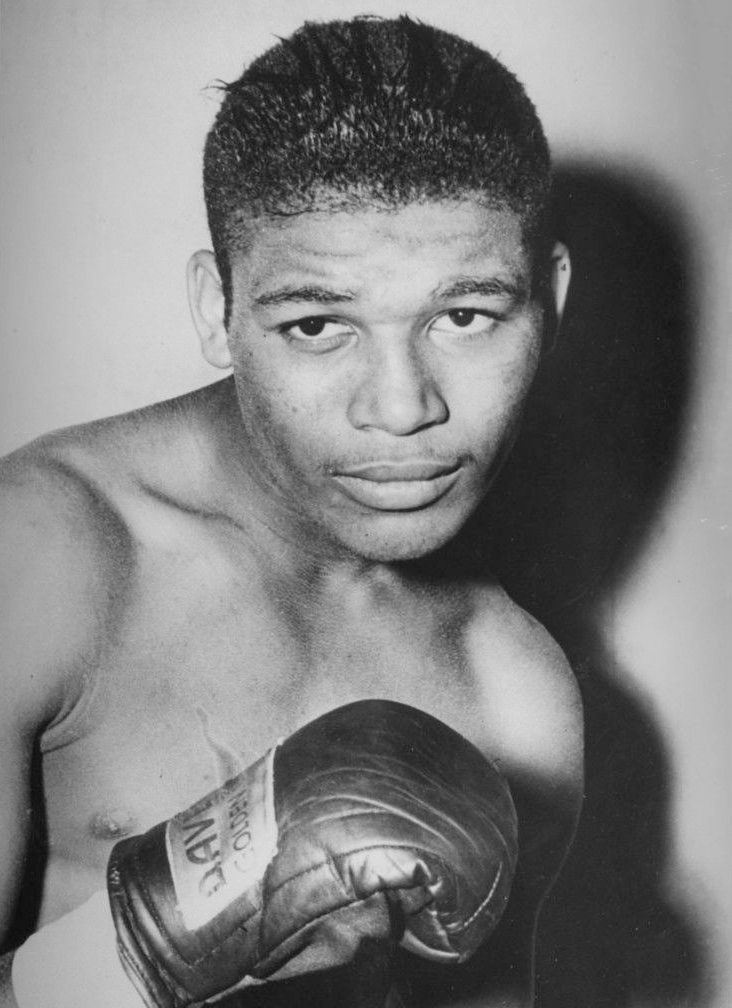
Sugar Ray Robinson

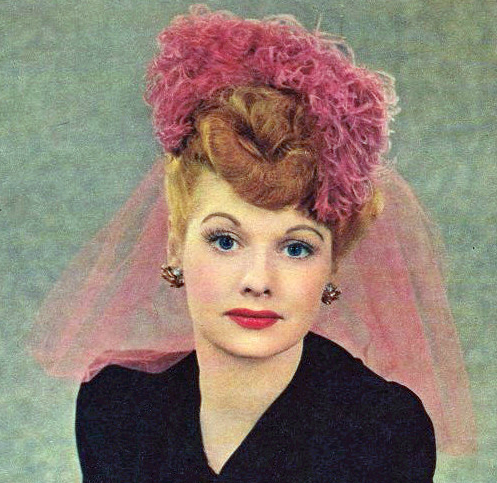
Lucille Ball

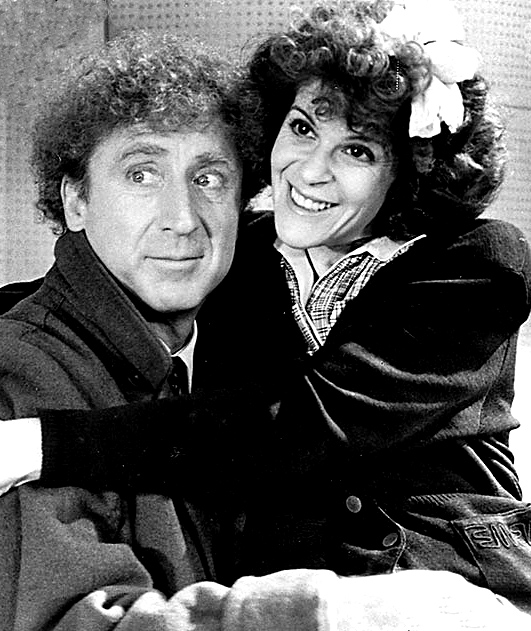
Gilda Radner

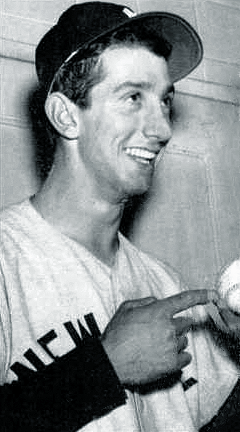
Billy Martin

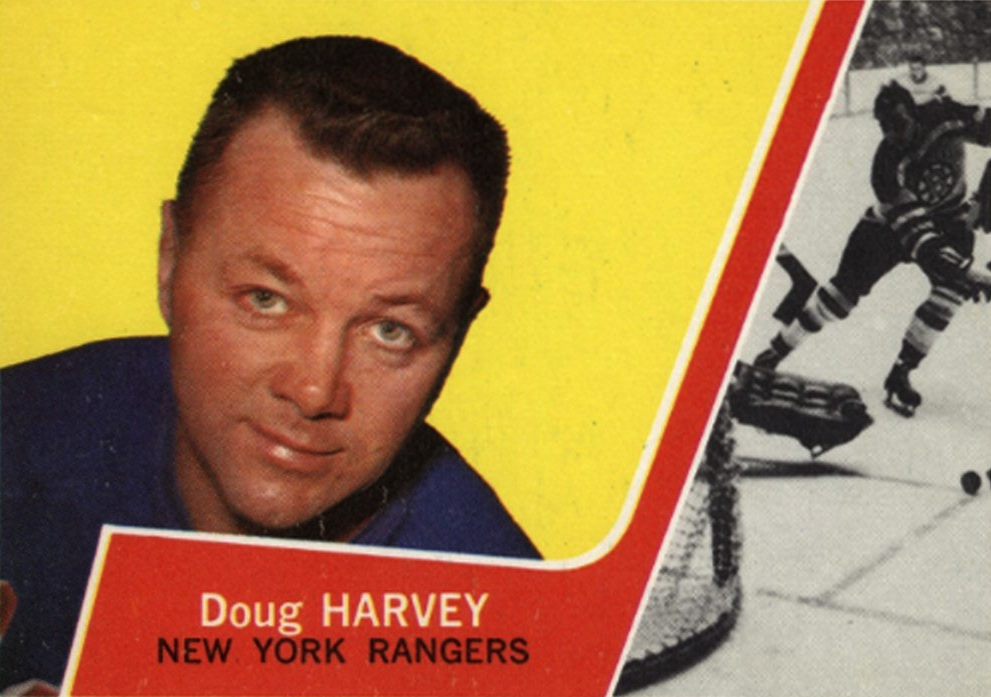
Doug Harvey

== See also ==
- History of Michigan
- History of Detroit
