= Inkster police slayings =

1987 crime in Michigan, United States

- Diagram of crime scene
- Location: Bungalow Motel, Michigan Avenue, Inkster, Michigan
- Date: July 9, 1987; 39 years ago
- Attack type: Police ambush
- Weapon: Firearms
- Deaths: 3
- Victims: Ira Parker, age 41; Daniel Dubiel, age 36; Clay Hoover, age 25
- Perpetrator: Unknown

The Bungalow motel shooting was the murder of three police officers in rooms 105 and 106 of the Bungalow Motel in Inkster, Michigan, on July 9, 1987.

== Background ==
=== Easter and her sons ===
Alberta Easter was born in approximately 1918 in either Mississippi or Illinois. She married Roy Lemons, a construction worker, in 1940. They had three sons: Roy Lemons Jr., born c. 1940; George Lester Lemons, born c. 1942; and William Monore Lemons, born c. 1944.

Easter had a history of criminal charges in and around Toledo, Ohio, including convictions of disturbing the peace and assault and battery. She began working as a real estate agent in the late 1950s and was accused in the 1960s of embezzling down payments and other instances of real estate fraud. While fraud chargers were dismissed, she was convicted of selling real estate without a license.

Easter and her sons moved to the Detroit area in 1968. She filed for divorce in 1971, though the divorce was not final until 1980. During her time in Detroit, she and her sons promoted various business concepts. Easter described herself as "a heckuva promoter" who had been "in sales all my life." According to a newspaper profile by reporter Susan Ager, her "finest asset" was "a tongue that could spin dreams and deals and explanations so swiftly that most people couldn't follow the words, couldn't add up the dollars, got lost and then impressed." Easter's most notorious venture was a record company, "Gold Soul" , and a music publishing company, "GSI", that Easter claimed would one day rival Motown. She reportedly collected at least $600,000 from over 20 investors to finance the recording and music publishing business, though the company reportedly only released only one unsuccessful album of Christmas music. The investors' money funded a lavish lifestyle, including fur coats, four leased Cadllacs, a leased motor home, and stretch limousines. The recording business was eventually forced into bankruptcy in 1981.

Easter later promoted other purported ventures, touting opportunities in commodities and currency trading, international finance, real estate development, and a chain of pizzerias. As her various ventures failed to pan out, she blamed racist bankers, the FBI, Interpol, white businesses, and others for sabotaging her efforts. She and her sons were evicted from the home where they had been living in Wayne, Michigan, and moved in 1986 into a Knights Inn in Romulus. After being evicted from the Knights Inn, they moved in 1987 into adjoining rooms at the $23-a-night Bungalow Motel in Inkster. The family's decline was exacerbated as the eldest son, George, described as "the brains of the family", became seriously ill with diabetes, failing kidneys, and a severe infection or gangrene in his feet.

In March 1987, the family opened a bank account with a check that bounced. Easter and son Roy then wrote a bad check for $286.40 to "Rent-a-Jalopy", to rent a station wagon, reportedly to transport George to doctors appointments. When the check bounced, the owner of Rent-a-Jalopy filed a criminal complaint. An assistant prosecutor in June 1987 obtained a warrant for the arrest of Easter and son Roy. Also in June 1987, a judge signed an eviction judgment against the family based on $2,464 in unpaid charges at the Bungalow Motel. Facing eviction from their low-budget motel, and with George's health in serious decline, police were authorized to arrest Alberta and Roy on the bad-check charge.

=== The police officers ===
The Inkster Police Department served the city of Inkster, Michigan, a western suburb of Detroit with a population slightly over 30,000. In 1987, the department had approximately 45 officers. The three officers who were slain in the shooting were:

- Sgt. Ira Parker, age 41, born 1946. He was survived by his wife, Dorothy, and four children, Trudy, Tracy, Ira Jr., and Timonty. He joined the Inkster Police Department in 1972.
- Officer Clay Hoover, age 25, born 1962. He was engaged to be married to Melissa Chmielewski. He had been with the Inkster Police Department since March 1987, having previously been with the Van Buren Township Police Department.
- Daniel Dubiel, age 36, born 1951. He was survived by his wife Laura and four children. He had been with the Inkster Police Department since 1974.

== The shooting ==
On July 9, shortly after 5 p.m., Inkster police officers Clay Hoover and Daniel Dubiel arrived at the Bungalow Motel to execute an arrest warrant on Alberta Easter and her son Roy for writing a bad check to Rent-A-Galopy. Garland Booker, a security guard for the motel, was allowed to accompany Hoover and Dubiel in order to simultaneously serve papers to evict the family from the motel.

According to Booker, Easter became enraged that the officers sought to arrest her, arguing that the car rental was a civil, not criminal matter, and insisting "somebody's out to get us." She claimed to know Detroit Mayor Coleman Young, local TV newscaster Bill Bonds, and Jesse Jackson, and threatened to enlist their aid. Easter demanded a supervisor, and Hoover and Dubiel radioed for their supervisor, Sgt. Ira Parker, to join them at the scene. Booker, who saw George Lemons holding an assault rifle behind a door and a pistol in William Lemons waistband, left the room and went to the motel office to call for more police. When Sgt. Parker arrived, Booker told him that the men in the room were armed with heavy firepower, but Parker said, "Don't worry, I've got my own."

At approximately 5:45 p.m., approximately three seconds after Parker entered room 105, Booker heard a burst of automatic gunfire followed by several rounds of pistol fire. According to some reports, Parker entered the room, touched Easter's elbow and told her she had to go with them, leading her sons to open fire, killing the three officers. The officers were shot between six and 13 times each. Roy Lemons then ran from the room and sprayed the parking lot and motel office with automatic gunfire. The motel owner, George Marleau, returned fire from the motel office, forcing Roy to retreat back into the rooms.

Backup officers arrived moments later, and a standoff lasting 10 hours followed. Over 100 police officers, FBI agents, and a SWAT team surrounded the motel. In an interview with a television reporter during the standoff, Easter claimed the three officers were alive and tied up in a bathroom. The standoff ended at 3:30 a.m. when the Rev. Jim Holley of Detroit's Little Rock Baptist Church persuaded Easter and her sons to surrender. In a search of the rooms, police discovered at least ten guns, including a .223-caliber semiautomatic rifle.

Had Easter gone peacefully with the police, the Detroit Free Press reported that Easter faced at most a night in the local jail on the bad-check charge.

According to U.S. Department of Justice records, the Bungalow Motel shooting was, at that time, the nation's worst police slaying since September 17, 1979, when three Cleveland officers were killed. It was exceeded only by the 1970 Newhall incident in which four California Highway Patrol officers were killed.

== The trial ==
Easter and her sons were tried before Judge Richard Hathaway of the Wayne County Circuit Court starting on May 10, 1988. Douglas Baker was the lead prosecutor, assisted by Barbara Smith.

After a 13-week trial, a jury in August 1988 found all four guilty of first-degree murder.

== Aftermath ==
On July 14, 1987, 3,000 police officers from across Michigan, the United States, and Canada attended a memorial service at the Inkster Recreation Center. Officers lined the drive six rows deep, saluting three times as the fallen officers passed.

In a year-end poll conducted by the Associated Press (AP), the Bungalow Motel shooting was selected as the No. 3 Michigan news story of 1987, trailing only Northwest Airlines Flight 255 and Pope John Paul II's visit to Detroit. The trial and conviction of Easter and her sons were selected by the AP as the No. 8 news story of 1988.

In 2002, the Inkster Police Department unveiled a seven-foot granite monument honoring the four Inkster police officers killed in the line of duty. Three of the four were the officers killed at the Bungalow Motel.

George Lemons died in 1996 of kidney problems.

Easter spent the remaining 24 years of her life in prison. She died at age 93 of respiratory failure in June 2011 at the Women's Huron Valley Correctional Facility in Ypsilanti, Michigan.
