= 1975 in Michigan =

- Decades: 1950s; 1960s; 1970s; 1980s; 1990s
- See also: History of Michigan; Historical outline of Michigan; List of years in Michigan; 1975 in the United States

Events from the year 1975 in Michigan.

The Associated Press (AP) selected the state's top news stories of 1975 as follows:

1. The disappearance of former Teamsters president Jimmy Hoffa on July 30 from the parking lot of the Machus Red Fox restaurant in Bloomfield Township where he had planned to meet with organized crime figures, Anthony Provenzano and Anthony Giacalone;
2. The resignation of Michigan Supreme Court Justice and former Governor John Swainson on November 7, five days after his conviction on three counts of perjury charges for lying to a federal grand jury investigating Swainson's role in a bribery conspiracy involving an effort to secure a new trial for a convicted burglar;
3. An upturn in the automobile business following a major slump in 1974;
4. The June 6 escape by helicopter of con man Dale Otto Remling from the nation's largest walled prison (Southern Michigan Prison in Jackson, Michigan) and his capture one day later at a bar 10 miles away in Leslie, Michigan;
5. The Michigan Legislature's struggles with a budget deficit;
6. Flooding in southern lower Michigan reported to be the worst since 1947;
7. The sinking of SS Edmund Fitzgerald, an ore carrier, in Lake Superior during a storm on November 10 with the loss of life of all 29 crew members;
8. Continued fallout from the Michigan PBB contamination incident in which a flame retardant chemical feed was mixed with livestock feed, distributed to Michigan farms, and fed to 1.5 million chickens, 30,000 cattle, 5,900 pigs, and 1,470 sheep;
9. The Ann Arbor Hospital Murders in which 10 patients at the Veterans Hospital in Ann Arbor died mysteriously from respiratory failure, later resulting in the 1976 trial and conviction of two nurses, Filipina Narciso and Leonora Perez; and
10. The automobile industry introduces rebates to spur sales.

The AP also selected the state's top sports stories as follows:

1. Hudson High School setting a national high school record by extending its winning streak to 72 games (before losing to Ishpeming in the Class C championship game);
2. The trade that sent Mickey Lolich from the Detroit Tigers to the New York Mets for Rusty Staub;
3. The NCAA investigation into Michigan State Spartans football;
4. The opening of the Pontiac Silverdome, a domed stadium built at a cost of $55.7 million;
5. The Detroit Tigers have a 19-game losing streak to set a modern American League record;
6. The Northern Michigan Wildcats football team won the NCAA Division II Football Championship;
7. The 1975 Michigan Wolverines football team compiles an 8–1–2 record in the regular season, loses to Ohio State, and goes on to lose to Oklahoma in the 1976 Orange Bowl;
8. The 1975 Detroit Tigers compile a 57–102 record, the second worst season in club history to that time;
9. Ten black players from the Michigan State Spartans men's basketball team were suspended after walking out; three white players later transferred;
10. Michigan high school football begins a playoff system with championships won by Livonia Franklin, Dearborn Divine Child, Ishpeming, and Crystal Falls Forest Park;
11. The trade of Dave Bing for Kevin Porter;
12. Mount Pleasant declaring itself the "City of Champions"; and
13. Marcel Dionne signing with the Los Angeles Kings and the Detroit Red Wings get Terry Harper and Don Maloney as compensation.

== Office holders ==
=== State office holders ===
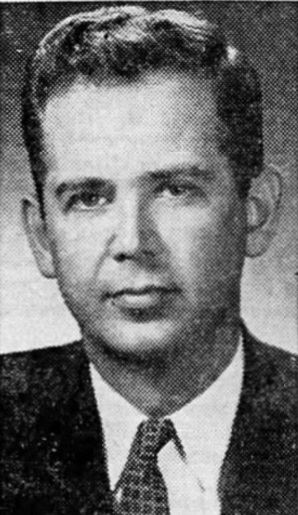
Gov. Milliken

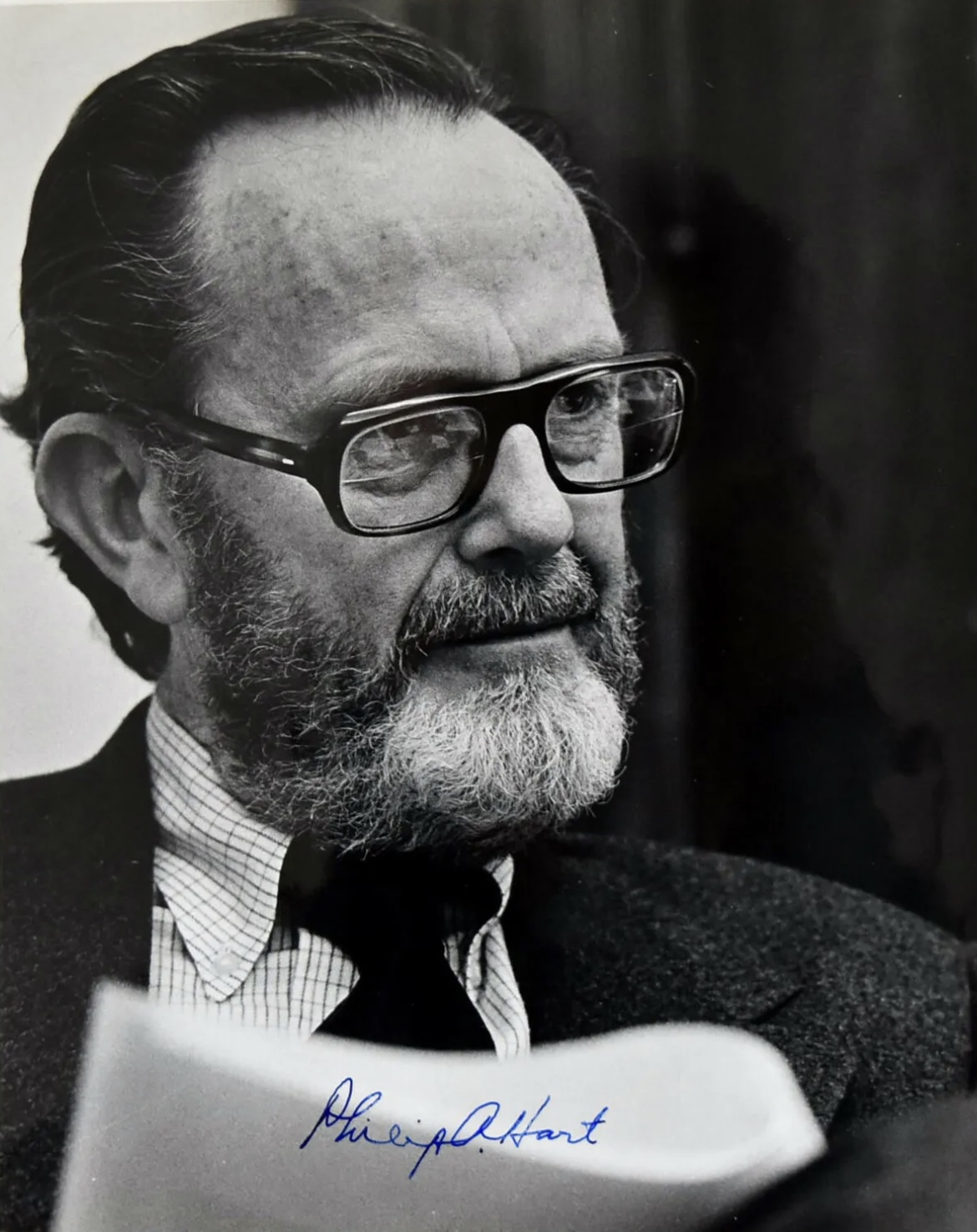
Sen. Hart

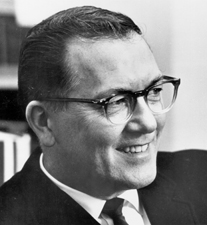
Sen. Griffin

- Governor of Michigan: William Milliken (Republican)
- Lieutenant Governor of Michigan: James Damman (Republican)
- Michigan Attorney General: Frank J. Kelley (Democrat)
- Michigan Secretary of State: Richard H. Austin (Democrat)
- Speaker of the Michigan House of Representatives: William A. Ryan (Democrat)
- Majority Leader of the Michigan Senate: Robert VanderLaan (Republican)/Milton Zaagman (Republican)
- Chief Justice, Michigan Supreme Court: Thomas G. Kavanagh

=== Mayors of major cities ===
- Mayor of Detroit: Coleman Young
- Mayor of Grand Rapids: Lyman Parks
- Mayor of Warren, Michigan: Ted Bates
- Mayor of Sterling Heights, Michigan: Anthony Dobry
- Mayor of Flint: Paul Calvin Visser
- Mayor of Dearborn: Orville L. Hubbard
- Mayor of Lansing: Gerald W. Graves
- Mayor of Ann Arbor: James E. Stephenson (Republican)
- Mayor of Saginaw: Raymond M. Tortora

=== Federal office holders ===
- United States Senator from Michigan: Philip Hart (Democrat)
- United States Senator from Michigan: Robert P. Griffin (Republican)
- United States Representative, District 1: John Conyers (Democrat)
- United States Representative, District 2: Marvin L. Esch (Republican)
- United States Representative, District 3: Garry E. Brown (Republican)
- United States Representative, District 4: J. Edward Hutchinson (Republican)
- United States Representative, District 5: Richard Vander Veen (Democrat)
- United States Representative, District 6: Bob Carr (Democrat)
- United States Representative, District 7: Donald W. Riegle Jr. (Democrat)
- United States Representative, District 8: J. Bob Traxler (Democrat)
- United States Representative, District 9: Guy Vander Jagt (Republican)
- United States Representative, District 10: Elford Albin Cederberg (Republican)
- United States Representative, District 11: Philip Ruppe (Republican)
- United States Representative, District 12: James G. O'Hara (Democrat)
- United States Representative, District 13: Charles Diggs (Democrat)
- United States Representative, District 14: Lucien N. Nedzi (Democrat)
- United States Representative, District 15: William D. Ford (Democrat)
- United States Representative, District 16: John Dingell (Democrat)
- United States Representative, District 17: William M. Brodhead (Democrat)
- United States Representative, District 18: James Blanchard (Democrat)
- United States Representative, District 19: William Broomfield (Republican)

== Population ==
In the 1970 United States census, Michigan was recorded as having a population of 8,875,083 persons, ranking as the seventh most populous state in the country. By 1980, the state's population had grown 4.4% to 9,262,078 persons.

=== Cities ===
The following is a list of cities in Michigan with a population of at least 70,000 based on 1970 U.S. Census data. Historic census data from 1960 and 1980 is included to reflect trends in population increases or decreases. Cities that are part of the Detroit metropolitan area are shaded in tan.

1970 Rank	City	County	1960 Pop.	1970 Pop.	1980 Pop.	Change 1970-80
1	Detroit	Wayne	1,670,144	1,514,063	1,203,368	−20.5% ▼
2	Grand Rapids	Kent	177,313	197,649	181,843	−8.0% ▼
3	Flint	Genesee	196,940	193,317	159,611	−17.4% ▼
4	Warren	Macomb	89,246	179,260	161,134	−10.1% ▼
5	Lansing	Ingham	107,807	131,403	130,414	−0.8% ▼
6	Livonia	Wayne	66,702	110,109	104,814	−4.8% ▼
7	Dearborn	Wayne	112,007	104,199	90,660	−13.0% ▼
8	Ann Arbor	Washtenaw	67,340	100,035	107,969	7.9% ▲
9	Saginaw	Saginaw	98,265	91,849	77,508	−15.6% ▼
10	St. Clair Shores	Macomb	76,657	88,093	76,210	−13.5% ▼
11	Westland	Wayne	60,743	86,749	84,603	−2.5% ▼
12	Royal Oak	Oakland	80,612	86,238	70,893	−17.8% ▼
13	Kalamazoo	Kalamazoo	82,089	85,555	79,722	−6.8% ▼
14	Pontiac	Oakland	82,233	85,279	76,715	−10.0% ▼
15	Dearborn Heights	Wayne	61,118	80,069	67,706	−15.4% ▼
16	Taylor	Wayne	na	70,020	77,568	10.8% ▲

=== Counties ===
The following is a list of counties in Michigan with populations of at least 120,000 based on 1970 U.S. Census data. Historic census data from 1960 and 1980 are included to reflect trends in population increases or decreases. Counties that are part of the Detroit metropolitan area are shaded in tan.

1970 Rank	County	Largest city	1960 Pop.	1970 Pop.	1980 Pop.	Change 1970-80
1	Wayne	Detroit	2,666,297	2,666,751	2,337,891	−12.3% ▼
2	Oakland	Pontiac	690,259	907,871	1,011,793	11.4% ▲
3	Macomb	Warren	405,804	625,309	694,600	11.1% ▲
4	Genesee	Flint	374,313	444,341	450,449	1.4% ▲
5	Kent	Grand Rapids	363,187	411,044	444,506	8.1% ▲
6	Ingham	Lansing	211,296	261,039	275,520	5.5% ▲
7	Washtenaw	Ann Arbor	172,440	234,103	264,748	13.1% ▲
8	Saginaw	Saginaw	190,752	219,743	228,059	3.8% ▲
9	Kalamazoo	Kalamazoo	169,712	201,550	212,378	5.4% ▲
10	Berrien	Benton Harbor	149,865	163,875	171,276	4.5% ▲
11	Muskegon	Muskegon	129,943	157,426	157,589	0.1% ▲
12	Jackson	Jackson	131,994	143,274	151,495	5.7% ▲
13	Calhoun	Battle Creek	138,858	141,963	141,557	−0.3% ▼
14	Ottawa	Holland	98,719	128,181	157,174	22.6% ▲
15	St. Clair	Port Huron	107,201	120,175	138,802	15.5% ▲
16	Monroe	Monroe	101,120	118,479	134,659	13.7% ▲
17	Bay	Bay City	107,042	117,339	119,881	2.2% ▲

== Sports ==
=== Baseball ===
- 1975 Detroit Tigers season – Under head coach Ralph Houk, the team compiled a record of 57–102, finished in last place in the American League East, and was outscored by opponents, 786 to 570. The team's batting leaders were Ben Oglivie with a .286 batting average, Willie Horton with 25 home runs and 92 RBIs, and Ron LeFlore with 28 stolen bases. The team's pitching leaders were Mickey Lolich with 12 wins and 139 strikeouts and John Hiller with a 2.17 earned run average.

=== American football ===
- 1975 Detroit Lions season – Under head coach Rick Forzano, the team compiled a 7–7 record and finished second in the NFC Central. The team's leaders included Joe Reed with 1,181 passing yards, Dexter Bussey with 696 rushing yards, Ray Jarvis with 501 receiving yards, and Errol Mann with 67 points scored.
- 1975 Michigan Wolverines football team – Under head coach Bo Schembechler, the team compiled an 8–2–2 record and was ranked No. 8 in the final AP and Coaches Polls. The team's two losses were to No. 1 ranked Ohio State and No. 3 ranked Oklahoma in the 1976 Orange Bowl, The team's statistical leaders included Rick Leach with 680 passing yards, Gordon Bell with 1,390 rushing yards (Rob Lytle added 1,030 rushing yards), and Jim Smith with 553 receiving yards.
- 1975 Michigan State Spartans football team – Under head coach Denny Stolz, the Spartans compiled a 7–4 record.

=== Basketball ===
- 1974–75 Detroit Pistons season – Under head coach Ray Scott, the Pistons compiled a 40–42 record. The team's statistical leaders included Bob Lanier with 1,823 points and 914 rebounds and Dave Bing with 610 assists.
- 1974–75 Michigan Wolverines men's basketball team – Under head coach Johnny Orr, the team compiled a 19–8 record and was ranked No. 19 in the final AP Poll.

=== Ice hockey ===
- 1974–75 Detroit Red Wings season – Under head coach Alex Delvecchio, the team compiled a 23–45–12 record and finished fourth in the Norris Division. The team's statistical leaders included Danny Grant with 50 goals and Marcel Dionne with 74 assists and 121 points.
- Great Lakes Invitational -

== Music ==
Albums and singles by Michigan artists or centered on Michigan topics that were released or became hits in 1975 include the following:

- "Some Kind of Wonderful", a single by Flint's Grand Funk Railroad, was released in December 1974, reached No. 3 on the Billboard Hot 100 and was ranked as the No. 6 song on Billboard Year-End Hot 100 singles of 1975.
- "One of These Nights", a single co-written by Detroit native Glenn Frey (with Don Henley), was released in May 1975, reached No. 1 on the Billboard Hot 100, and was ranked as the No. 10 song on Billboard Year-End Hot 100 singles of 1975.
- "Best of My Love", a single co-written by Detroit natives Glenn Frey and JD Souther (with Don Henley), was released in November 1974, reached No. 1 on the Billboard Hot 100, and was ranked as the No. 13 song on Billboard Year-End Hot 100 singles of 1975.
- "Boogie On Reggae Woman", a single from Detroit native Stevie Wonder, was released in November 1974, reached No. 1 on the Billboard R&B chart, and was ranked as the No. 26 song on Billboard Year-End Hot 100 singles of 1975.
- "Bad Time", a single by Grand Funk Railroad, was released in March 1975, reached No. 4 on the Billboard Hot 100, and was ranked as the No. 62 song on Billboard Year-End Hot 100 singles of 1975.
- "Only Women Bleed", a single by Detroit native Alice Cooper, was released in April 1975, reached No. 12 on the Billboard R&B chart, and was ranked as the No. 63 song on Billboard Year-End Hot 100 singles of 1975. Cooper began his Welcome to My Nightmare tour on March 21 in Kalamazoo, Michigan. The elaborate show is among the largest stage spectacles of the decade.
- Beautiful Loser, the eighth studio album by Bob Seger, was released in April 1975. The album included the songs "Beautiful Loser", "Katmandu", and "Nutbush City Limits".
- Mahogany, a soundtrack album by Diana Ross, was released in October 1975 and reached No. 20 on the Billboard album chart. The single "Theme from Mahogany (Do You Know Where You're Going To)" reached No. 1 on the Billboard Hot 100.
- Ted Nugent, the debut studio album from Ted Nugent, was released in September 1975, reached No. 28 on the Billboard album chart, and was certified double platinum. It included the single "Stranglehold".
- Caught in the Act, a live album from Grand Funk Railroad, was released in August 1975 and reached No. 21 on the Billboard album chart.
- A Quiet Storm, an album by Smokey Robinson, was released in March 1975. The single "Baby That's Backatcha" reached No. 1 on the R&B chart.
- You, a studio album by Aretha Franklin, was released in October 1975 and reached No. 83 on the Billboard album chart.
- A Song for You, a studio album by The Temptations, was released in January 1975 and reached No. 13 on the Billboard album chart. The album featured two No. 1 R&B hits: "Happy People" and "Shakey Ground"
- On October 9, rock band Kiss earned publicity by playing the homecoming dance of Cadillac High School in Cadillac, Michigan.
- On December 31, Elvis Presley performed before the biggest audience of his career, at Pontiac's Silverdome. During the show, Elvis ripped his pants onstage and had to leave to change.

== Births ==
- January 2 - Dax Shepard, actor (Parenthood, CHiPs), in Highland Township, Oakland County, Michigan
- July 1 - Sufjan Stevens, singer/songwriter, in Detroit
- July 9 - Jack White, in Detroit

=== Gallery of 1975 births ===
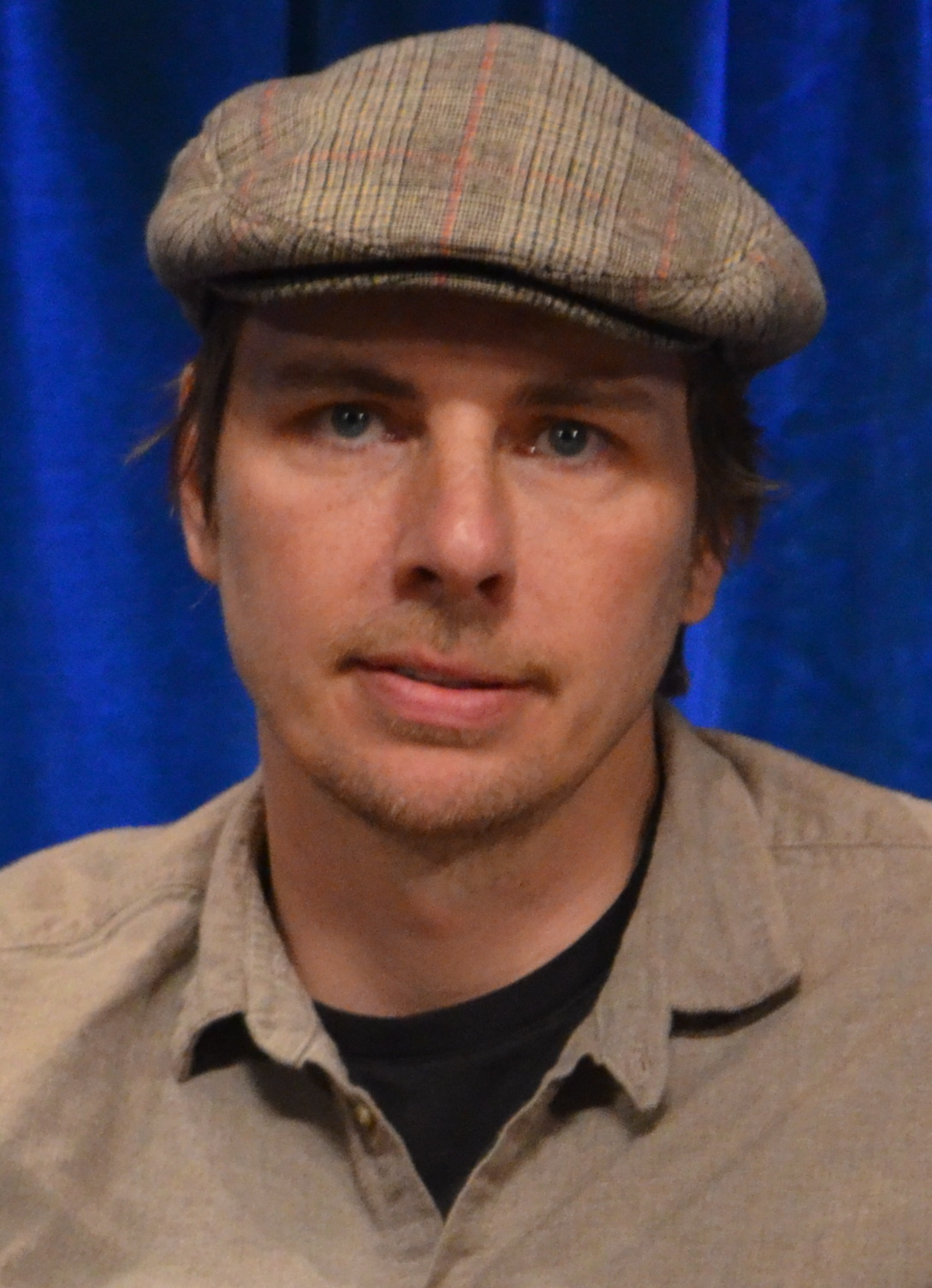
Dax Shepard

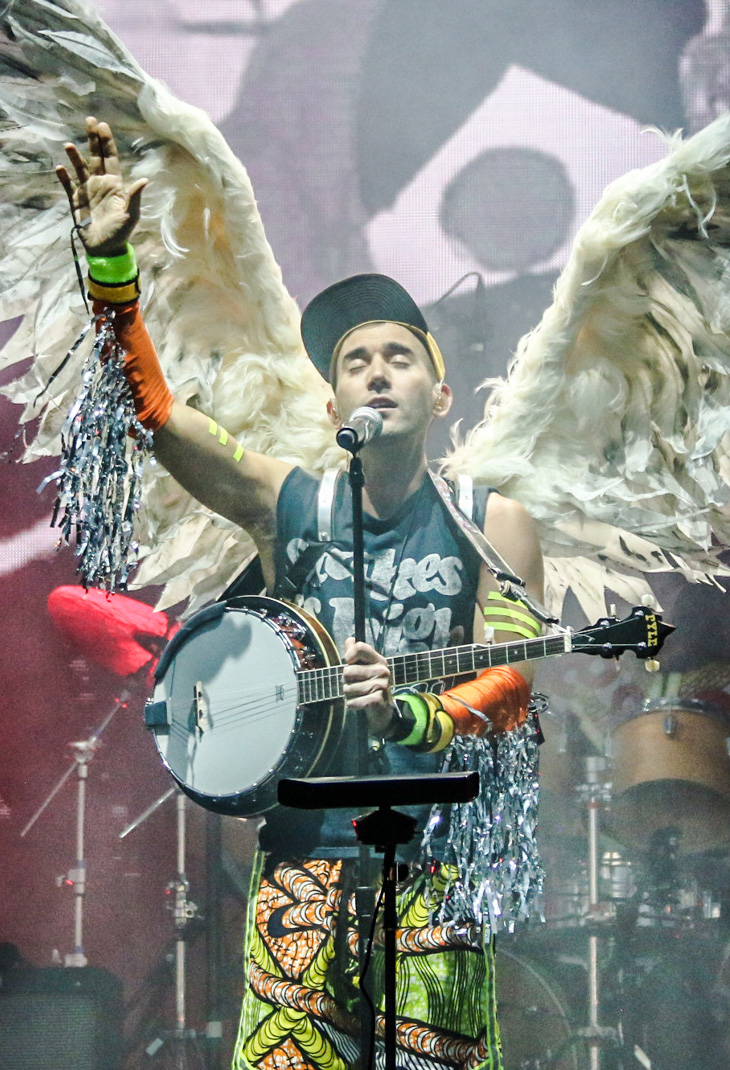
Sufjan Stevens

== Deaths ==
- April 6 - Arthur J. Lacy, politician, lawyer, and philanthropist at age 98 in Birmingham
- March 18 - Biggie Munn, American football player and coach and athletic director, at age 66 in Lansing
- July 30 - Jimmy Hoffa, labor leader, disappeared at age 62 in Bloomfield Township
