= 1976 in Michigan =

- Decades: 1950s; 1960s; 1970s; 1980s; 1990s
- See also: History of Michigan; Historical outline of Michigan; List of years in Michigan; 1976 in the United States

Events from the year 1976 in Michigan.

The Associated Press (AP) selected the top Michigan news stories of 1976 as follows:

1. United Auto Workers strikes against Ford Motor Company lasting 28 days (from September 14 to October 12) and General Motors lasting 12 hours (from midnight until noon on November 19);
2. A forest fire lasting for two months from July until September that blackened 65,000 acres in the Seney National Wildlife Refuge in the Upper Peninsula with state and federal firefighting costs reaching $7.5 million;
3. Continued fallout from the Michigan polybrominated biphenyl contamination incident in which the flame retardant chemical was mixed with livestock feed, distributed to Michigan farms, and fed to 1.5 million chickens, 30,000 cattle, 5,900 pigs, and 1,470 sheep;
4. Voter approval on November 2 of a ballot proposal banning throwaway beverage containers;
5. Gerald Ford's November 2 loss to Jimmy Carter in the 1976 U.S. Presidential election, though Ford took Michigan's 21 electoral votes with 51.8% of the state's votes to 46.4% for Carter;
6. A March 3 ice storm that left 200,000 homes in southern Michigan without power and caused millions of dollars in damage;
7. Congressman Donald Riegle's election to replace retiring U.S. Senator Philip Hart after defeating Secretary of State Richard H. Austin and Congressman James G. O'Hara in the Democratic primary on August 3 and Marvin Esch in the general election on November 2;
8. A violent melee on August 15 that erupted following a concert at Cobo Hall featuring Average White Band and Kool & the Gang with multiple robberies and beatings and two gang rapes;
9. The prosecution of two Filipina nurses, Filipina Narciso and Leonora Perez, in the Ann Arbor Hospital Murders in which 10 patients at the Veterans Hospital in Ann Arbor died mysteriously from respiratory failure; and
10. The state's fiscal year is extended by three months to avoid a deficit.

The AP also selected the state's top sports stories as follows:

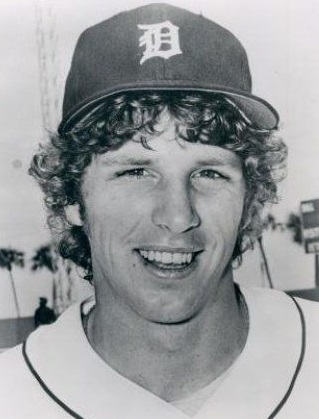
Mark Fidrych

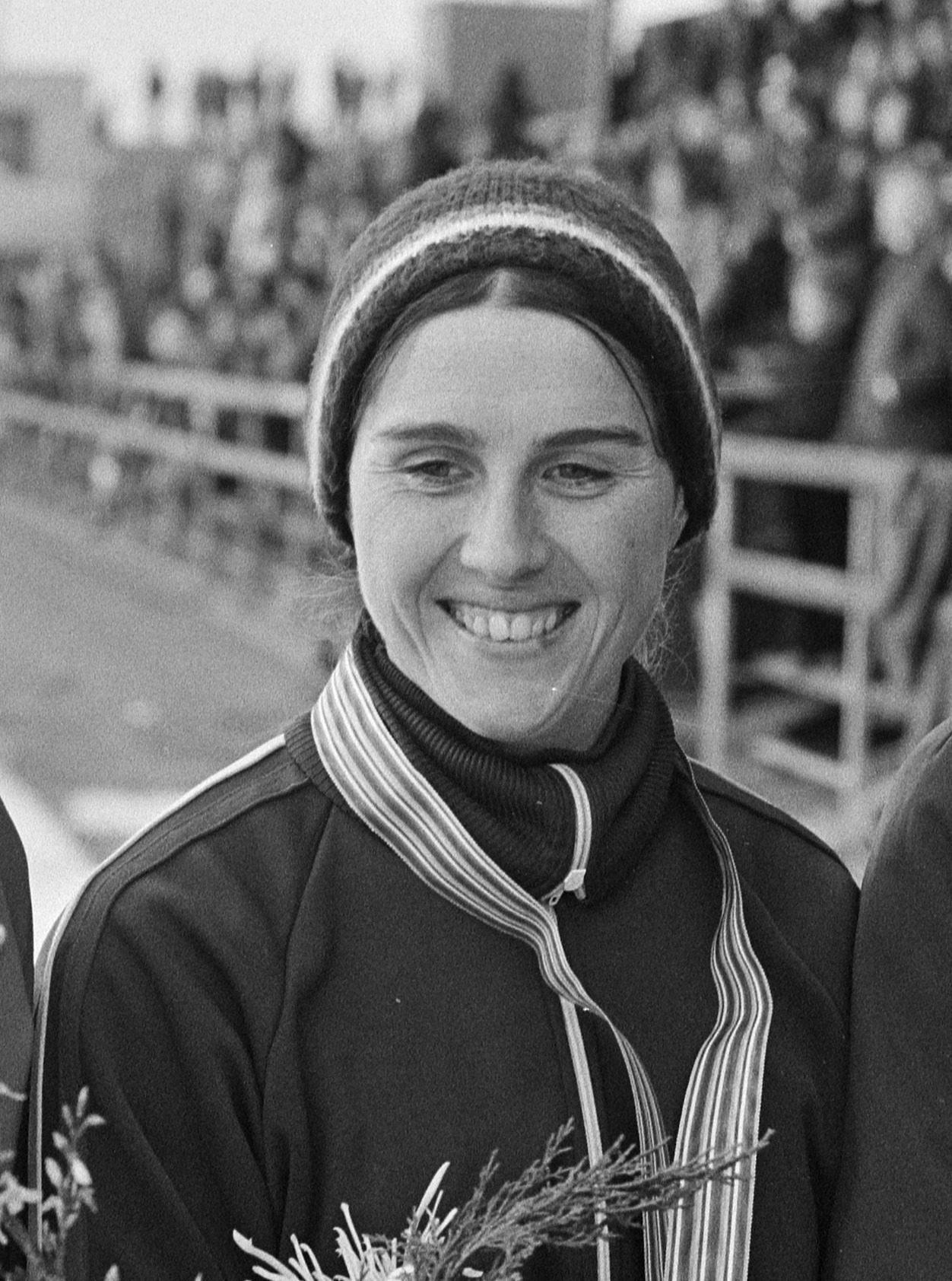
Sheila Young

1. The success of rookie pitcher Mark Fidrych who won 19 games for the Detroit Tigers, was the starting pitcher for the American League in the All-Star Game, led the American League with a 2.34 earned run average, and was named American League Rookie of the Year;
2. The NCAA's imposition of three years of probation against the Michigan State Spartans football team for illegal recruiting and the firing of head coach Denny Stolz and athletic director Burt Smith;
3. The 1976 Michigan Wolverines football team that compiled a 10–1 record in the regular season and was ranked No. 1 before being upset by Purdue;
4. The 1975–76 Michigan Wolverines men's basketball team that compiled a 25–7 record and advanced to the Final Four, losing to Indiana in the championship game;
5. Ron LeFlore compiling a 30-game hitting streak, the longest in the American League in 27 years, and stealing 56 bases for the Detroit Tigers;
6. Detroit speedskater Sheila Young winning gold, silver and bronze medals at the 1976 Winter Olympics in Innsbruck, Austria;
7. Rick Forzano's resignation as head coach of the Detroit Lions on October 4, the hiring of Tommy Hudspeth as head coach on October 5, and the team compiling a 6–8 record;
8. The 1975-76 Western Michigan Broncos men's basketball team compiling a 25–3 record and advancing to the Sweet 16 round of the 1976 NCAA Division I Basketball Tournament before narrowly losing to No. 2 ranked Marquette;
9. The Detroit Pistons selection of Marvin Barnes on August 5 with the fourth overall pick in the ABA dispersal draft; and
10. Bo Schembechler undergoing open heart surgery to perform four bypasses on May 20 and deciding to continue coaching.

== Office holders ==
=== State office holders ===
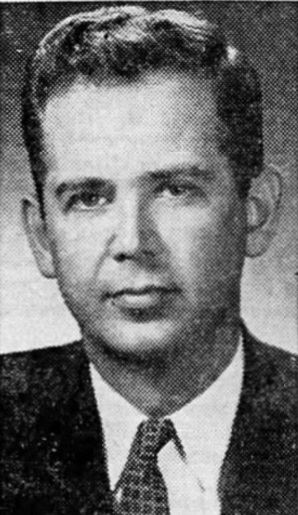
Gov. Milliken

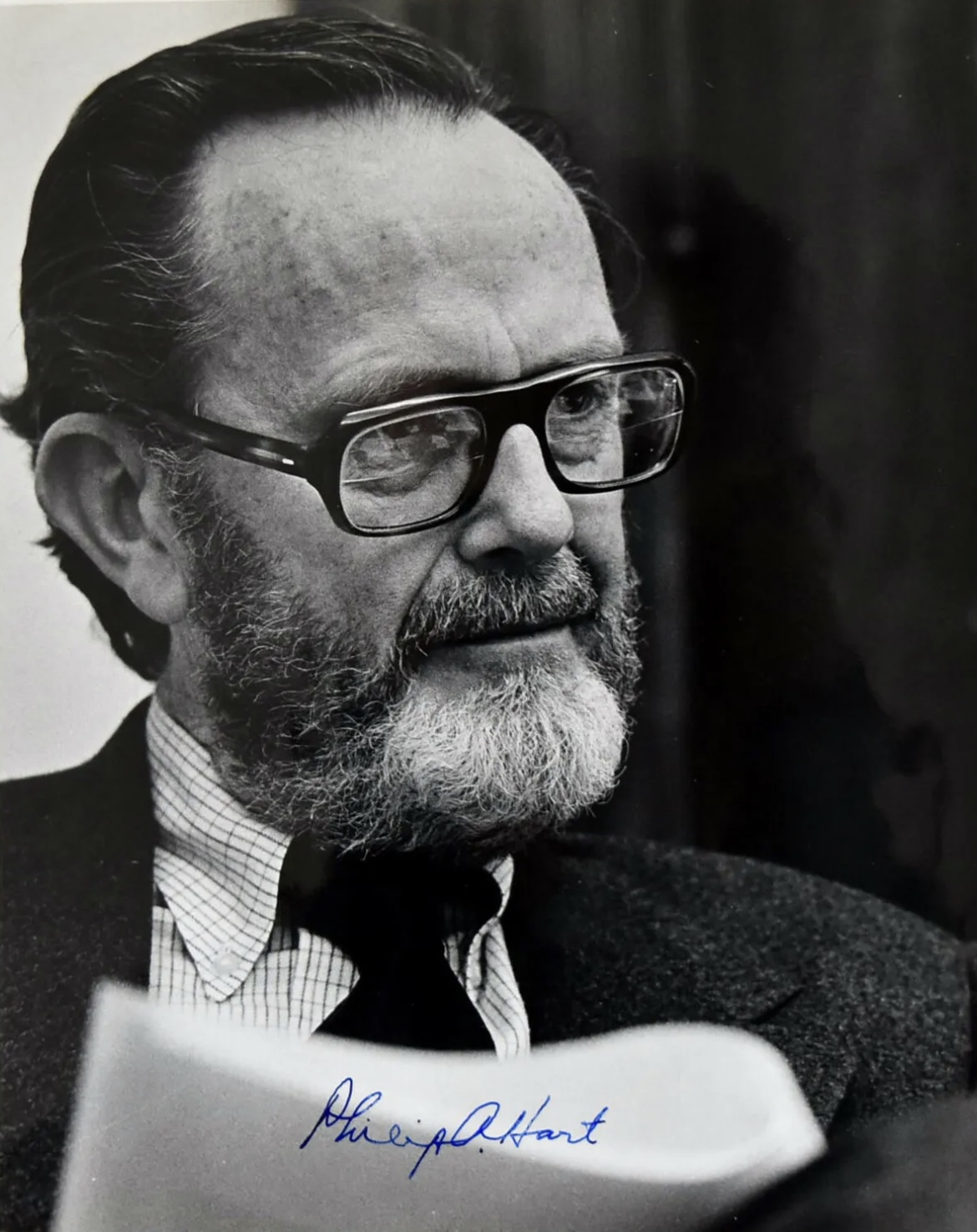
Sen. Hart

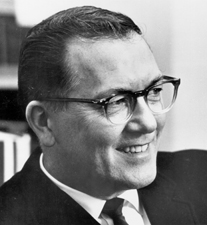
Sen. Griffin

- Governor of Michigan: William Milliken (Republican)
- Lieutenant Governor of Michigan: James Damman (Republican)
- Michigan Attorney General: Frank J. Kelley (Democrat)
- Michigan Secretary of State: Richard H. Austin (Democrat)
- Speaker of the Michigan House of Representatives: Bobby Crim (Democrat)
- Majority Leader of the Michigan Senate: William B. Fitzgerald, Jr. (Democrat)/William Faust (Democrat)
- Chief Justice, Michigan Supreme Court: Thomas G. Kavanagh

=== Mayors of major cities ===
- Mayor of Detroit: Coleman Young
- Mayor of Grand Rapids: Lyman Parks/Abe L. Drasin
- Mayor of Warren, Michigan: Ted Bates
- Mayor of Sterling Heights, Michigan: Anthony Dobry
- Mayor of Flint: James W. Rutherford
- Mayor of Dearborn: Orville L. Hubbard
- Mayor of Lansing: Gerald W. Graves
- Mayor of Ann Arbor: Albert Wheeler (Democrat)
- Mayor of Saginaw: Raymond M. Tortora

=== Federal office holders ===
- United States Senator from Michigan: Philip Hart (Democrat)
- United States Senator from Michigan: Robert P. Griffin (Republican)
- United States Representative, District 1: John Conyers (Democrat)
- United States Representative, District 2: Marvin L. Esch (Republican)
- United States Representative, District 3: Garry E. Brown (Republican)
- United States Representative, District 4: J. Edward Hutchinson (Republican)
- United States Representative, District 5: Richard Vander Veen (Democrat)
- United States Representative, District 6: Bob Carr (Democrat)
- United States Representative, District 7: Donald W. Riegle Jr. (Democrat)
- United States Representative, District 8: J. Bob Traxler (Democrat)
- United States Representative, District 9: Guy Vander Jagt (Republican)
- United States Representative, District 10: Elford Albin Cederberg (Republican)
- United States Representative, District 11: Philip Ruppe (Republican)
- United States Representative, District 12: James G. O'Hara (Democrat)
- United States Representative, District 13: Charles Diggs (Democrat)
- United States Representative, District 14: Lucien N. Nedzi (Democrat)
- United States Representative, District 15: William D. Ford (Democrat)
- United States Representative, District 16: John Dingell (Democrat)
- United States Representative, District 17: William M. Brodhead (Democrat)
- United States Representative, District 18: James Blanchard (Democrat)
- United States Representative, District 19: William Broomfield (Republican)

== Population ==
In the 1970 United States census, Michigan was recorded as having a population of 8,875,083 persons, ranking as the seventh most populous state in the country. By 1980, the state's population had grown 4.4% to 9,262,078 persons.

=== Cities ===
The following is a list of cities in Michigan with a population of at least 70,000 based on 1970 U.S. Census data. Historic census data from 1960 and 1980 is included to reflect trends in population increases or decreases. Cities that are part of the Detroit metropolitan area are shaded in tan.

1970 Rank	City	County	1960 Pop.	1970 Pop.	1980 Pop.	Change 1970-80
1	Detroit	Wayne	1,670,144	1,514,063	1,203,368	−20.5% ▼
2	Grand Rapids	Kent	177,313	197,649	181,843	−8.0% ▼
3	Flint	Genesee	196,940	193,317	159,611	−17.4% ▼
4	Warren	Macomb	89,246	179,260	161,134	−10.1% ▼
5	Lansing	Ingham	107,807	131,403	130,414	−0.8% ▼
6	Livonia	Wayne	66,702	110,109	104,814	−4.8% ▼
7	Dearborn	Wayne	112,007	104,199	90,660	−13.0% ▼
8	Ann Arbor	Washtenaw	67,340	100,035	107,969	7.9% ▲
9	Saginaw	Saginaw	98,265	91,849	77,508	−15.6% ▼
10	St. Clair Shores	Macomb	76,657	88,093	76,210	−13.5% ▼
11	Westland	Wayne	60,743	86,749	84,603	−2.5% ▼
12	Royal Oak	Oakland	80,612	86,238	70,893	−17.8% ▼
13	Kalamazoo	Kalamazoo	82,089	85,555	79,722	−6.8% ▼
14	Pontiac	Oakland	82,233	85,279	76,715	−10.0% ▼
15	Dearborn Heights	Wayne	61,118	80,069	67,706	−15.4% ▼
16	Taylor	Wayne	na	70,020	77,568	10.8% ▲

=== Counties ===
The following is a list of counties in Michigan with populations of at least 120,000 based on 1970 U.S. Census data. Historic census data from 1960 and 1980 are included to reflect trends in population increases or decreases. Counties that are part of the Detroit metropolitan area are shaded in tan.

1970 Rank	County	Largest city	1960 Pop.	1970 Pop.	1980 Pop.	Change 1970-80
1	Wayne	Detroit	2,666,297	2,666,751	2,337,891	−12.3% ▼
2	Oakland	Pontiac	690,259	907,871	1,011,793	11.4% ▲
3	Macomb	Warren	405,804	625,309	694,600	11.1% ▲
4	Genesee	Flint	374,313	444,341	450,449	1.4% ▲
5	Kent	Grand Rapids	363,187	411,044	444,506	8.1% ▲
6	Ingham	Lansing	211,296	261,039	275,520	5.5% ▲
7	Washtenaw	Ann Arbor	172,440	234,103	264,748	13.1% ▲
8	Saginaw	Saginaw	190,752	219,743	228,059	3.8% ▲
9	Kalamazoo	Kalamazoo	169,712	201,550	212,378	5.4% ▲
10	Berrien	Benton Harbor	149,865	163,875	171,276	4.5% ▲
11	Muskegon	Muskegon	129,943	157,426	157,589	0.1% ▲
12	Jackson	Jackson	131,994	143,274	151,495	5.7% ▲
13	Calhoun	Battle Creek	138,858	141,963	141,557	−0.3% ▼
14	Ottawa	Holland	98,719	128,181	157,174	22.6% ▲
15	St. Clair	Port Huron	107,201	120,175	138,802	15.5% ▲
16	Monroe	Monroe	101,120	118,479	134,659	13.7% ▲
17	Bay	Bay City	107,042	117,339	119,881	2.2% ▲

== Sports ==
=== Baseball ===
- 1976 Detroit Tigers season – Under manager Ralph Houk, the Tigers compiled a 74–87 record and finished fifth in the American League East. The team's statistical leaders included Ron LeFlore with a .316 batting average, Jason Thompson with 17 home runs, Rusty Staub with 96 RBIs, and Mark Fidrych with 19 wins and a 2.34 earned run average (ERA). Fidrych led the American League in ERA and was selected as the American League Rookie of the Year and as the top sports story in Michigan in 1976. LeFlore had a 36-game hitting streak, the longest by a Tiger in 33 years, and stole 56 bases, the most by a Tiger in 60 years.
- 1976 Michigan Wolverines baseball team - Under head coach Moby Benedict, the Wolverines compiled a 22–20–1 record and won the Big Ten Conference championship. Pitcher Lary Sorensen and Mark Weber were selected as the team's most valuable players. Second baseman Dick Walterhouse was the team captain. Rick Leach led the team with a .345 batting average.

=== American football ===
- 1976 Detroit Lions season – The Lions, under head coaches Rick Forzano and Tommy Hudspeth, compiled a 6–8 record and finished in third place in the NFL's Central Division. The team's statistical leaders included Greg Landry with 2,191 passing yards, Dexter Bussey with 858 rushing yards, Ray Jarvis with 822 receiving yards, and Benny Ricardo with 49 points scored.
- 1976 Michigan Wolverines football team – Under head coach Bo Schembechler, the Wolverines compiled a 10–1 record in the regular season and lost to USC in the 1977 Rose Bowl. The Wolverines were ranked No. 3 in the final AP Poll. The team's statistical leaders included Rick Leach with 973 passing yards, Rob Lytle with 1,469 rushing yards and 96 points scored, and Jim Smith with 714 receiving yards.
- 1976 Michigan State Spartans football team – Under head coach Darryl Rogers, the Spartans compiled a 4–6–1 record. The team's statistical leaders included Ed Smith with 1,749 passing yards, Richard Baes with 931 rushing yards, and Kirk Gibson with 748 receiving yards.
- 1976 Central Michigan Chippewas football team – Under head coach Roy Kramer, the Chippewas compiled a 7–4 record.
- 1976 Eastern Michigan Hurons football team – Under head coach Ed Chlebek, the Hurons compiled a 2–9 record.
- 1976 Western Michigan Broncos football team – Under head coach Elliot Uzelac, the Broncos compiled a 7–4 record.

=== Basketball ===
- 1975–76 Detroit Pistons season – Under head coaches Ray Scott and Herb Brown, the Pistons compiled a 34–46 record and finished second in the NBA's Midwest Division. The team's statistical leaders included Bob Lanier with 1,366 points and 746 rebounds and Eric Money with 338 assists.
- 1975–76 Michigan Wolverines men's basketball team – Under head coach Johnny Orr, the Wolverines compiled a 25–7 record, advanced to the Final Four in the 1976 NCAA Division I Basketball Tournament, losing to Indiana in the title game. The team's statistical leaders included Rickey Green with 638 points and 132 assists and Phil Hubbard with 352 rebounds.
- 1975–76 Western Michigan Broncos men's basketball team – Under head coach Eldon Miller, the Broncos compiled a 25–3 record, won the Mid-American Conference championship, and advanced to the Sweet 16 round of the 1976 NCAA Division I Basketball Tournament.
- 1975–76 Detroit Titans men's basketball team – The Titans compiled a 19–8 record under head coach Dick Vitale. The team's statistical leaders included John Long with 532 points and Terry Tyler with 298 rebounds.
- 1975–76 Michigan State Spartans men's basketball team – Under head coach Gus Ganakas, the Spartans compiled a 14–13 record and finished fourth in the Big Ten Conference. The team's statistical leaders included Terry Furlow with 793 points and Greg Kelser with 260 rebounds.

=== Ice hockey ===
- 1975–76 Detroit Red Wings season – Under head coaches Doug Barkley and Alex Delvecchio, the Red Wings compiled a 26–44–10 record and finished fourth in the National Hockey League's Norris Division. The team's statistical leaders included Michel Bergeron with 32 goals and Walt McKechnie with 56 assists and 82 points. The team's regular goaltenders were Jim Rutherford and Eddie Giacomin.
- 1975–76 Michigan Tech Huskies men's ice hockey team – Under head coach John MacInnes, Michigan Tech compiled a 34–9 record and finished second in the 1976 NCAA Division I Men's Ice Hockey Tournament, losing to Minnesota in the title game.
- 1975–76 Michigan State Spartans men's ice hockey team – Under head coach Amo Bessone, the Spartans compiled a 23–15–2 record.
- 1975–76 Michigan Wolverines men's ice hockey season – Under head coach Dan Farrell, the Wolverines compiled a 21–18 record.
- Great Lakes Invitational -

== Music ==
Albums and singles by Michigan artists or centered on Michigan topics that were released or became hits in 1976 include the following:

- "Love Machine" by The Miracles was released in October 1975 and was ranked as the No. 7 hit on the Billboard Year-End Hot 100 singles of 1976.
- "Theme from Mahogany (Do You Know Where You're Going To)" by Diana Ross was released in September 1975 and was ranked as the No. 43 hit on the Billboard Year-End Hot 100 singles of 1976.
- Born to Die by Grand Funk Railroad was released in January 1976.
- Diana Ross by Diana Ross was released on February 10, 1976. It included the song "Love Hangover" which was ranked as the No. 15 hit on the Billboard Year-End Hot 100 singles of 1976.
- Live Bullet by Bob Seger & The Silver Bullet Band was released on April 12, 1976. It was recorded live at Cobo Hall in Detroit.
- Alice Cooper Goes to Hell by Alice Cooper was released on June 25, 1976.
- "Detroit Rock City" by Kiss was released on July 28, 1976.
- "The Wreck of the Edmund Fitzgerald" by Gordon Lightfoot was released in August 1976. It reached No. 2 on the Billboard Hot 100.
- Songs in the Key of Life by Stevie Wonder was released on September 28, 1976. It included the songs Sir Duke, Isn't She Lovely, and As. In 2003, it was ranked No. 57 on Rolling Stone's 500 Greatest Albums of All Time.
- Night Moves by Bob Seger & The Silver Bullet Band was released on October 22, 1976. It was certified platinum and featured the songs, "Night Moves", "Mainstreet", "Rock and Roll Never Forgets", "The Fire Down Below", and "Mary Lou".
- Free-for-All by Ted Nugent was released in October 1976 and was certified platinum.

== Chronology of events ==
=== January ===
- January 10 - U.S. Rep. Philip Ruppe announced his opposition to Project Seafarer, the Navy's proposal to build a submarine communications system in the Upper Peninsula.
- January 18 - record-breaking cold temperatures in Lansing (25 below zero), Flint (25 below zero) and Detroit (18 below zero)
- January 22 - New law mandating minimum two-year prison terms for persons carrying guns while committing felonies passed the Michigan Senate
- January 22 - Three killed in explosion at Zilwaukee Garm Bureau grain elevator
- January 24 - Wayne County Sheriff ordered to stop admitting prisoners to county jail due to overcrowding
- January 25 - The NCAA placed MSU Spartans football on probation for three years with no bowl or TV appearances and reduced scholarships, due to recruiting violations
- January 26 - Court-ordered integration plan commences in Detroit schools with 30,000 students from grades one to five bused to new schools to increase integration
- January 26 - Former Governor and Supreme Court Justice John Swainson sentenced to 60 days in a federal halfway house for lying to a federal grand jury
- January 31 - President Ford made campaign appearance in Dearborn
- January 31 - Detroit bar owner Andrew Chimarian found guilty by a jury of a misdemeanor for shooting 18-year-old black man in back of the head

== Births ==
- January 23 - Tony Lucca, singer/songwriter, in Pontiac, Michigan
- January 28 - Jon Jansen, NFL offensive lineman (1998-2009), in Clawson, Michigan
- April 27 - Blaze Ya Dead Homie, rapper, in Mt. Clemens, Michigan
- May 2 - Andy Ponstein, stock car racing driver, in Jenison, Michigan
- May 2 - Jeff Gutt, vocalist Stone Temple Pilots, in Marine City, Michigan
- May 27 - Tiffany P. Cunningham, U.S. circuit judge, in Detroit
- May 31 - Mashona Washington tennis player, in Flint, Michigan
- July 5 - Bizarre (rapper) in Detroit
- July 10 - Elissa Slotkin, US House of Representatives, in New York City
- July 24 - Rashida Tlaib, US House of Representatives (2019-), first woman of Palestinian descent in Congress, in Detroit
- July 27 - Seamus Dever, actor, in Flint, Michigan
- July 28 - Huma Abedin, political staffer who was vice chair of Hillary Clinton's 2016 campaign for President, in Kalamazoo, Michigan
- August 23 - Kate Markgraf, GM US women's national soccer team, 3x Olympic medalist, in Bloomfield Hills, Michigan
- September 18 - Sophina Brown, actress, in Saginaw, Michigan
- October 7 - Charles Woodson, UM cornerback (1995-97), Heisman Trophy, in Fremont, Ohio
- October 30 - David Hahn, Boy Scout built homemade neutron source at age 17, in Royal Oak

=== Gallery of 1976 births ===
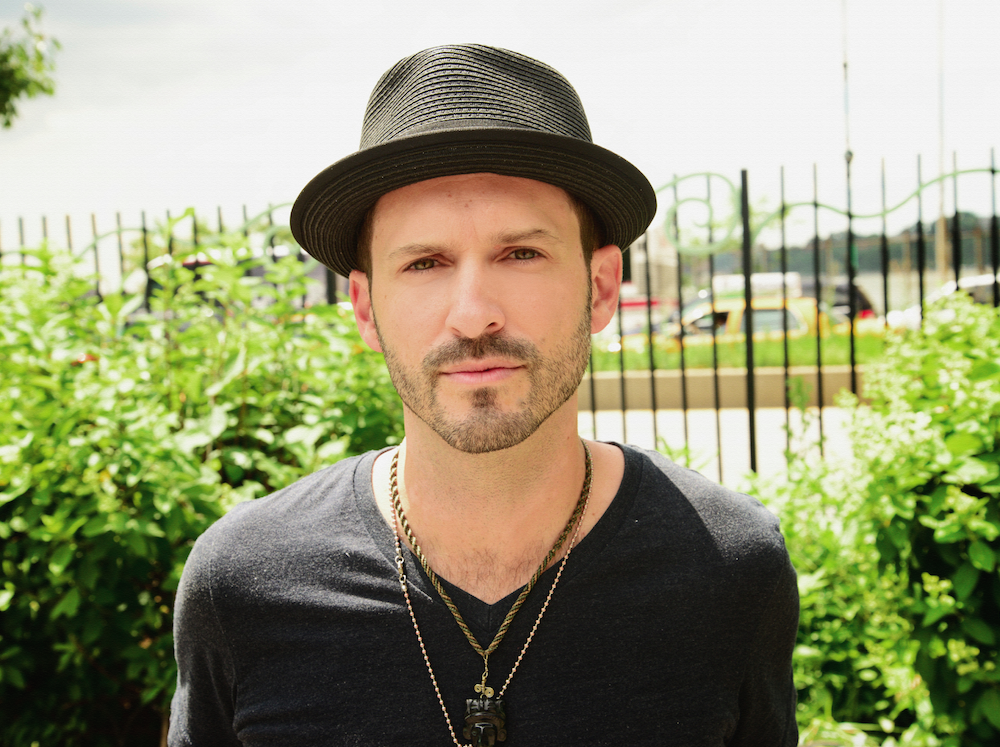
Tony Lucca

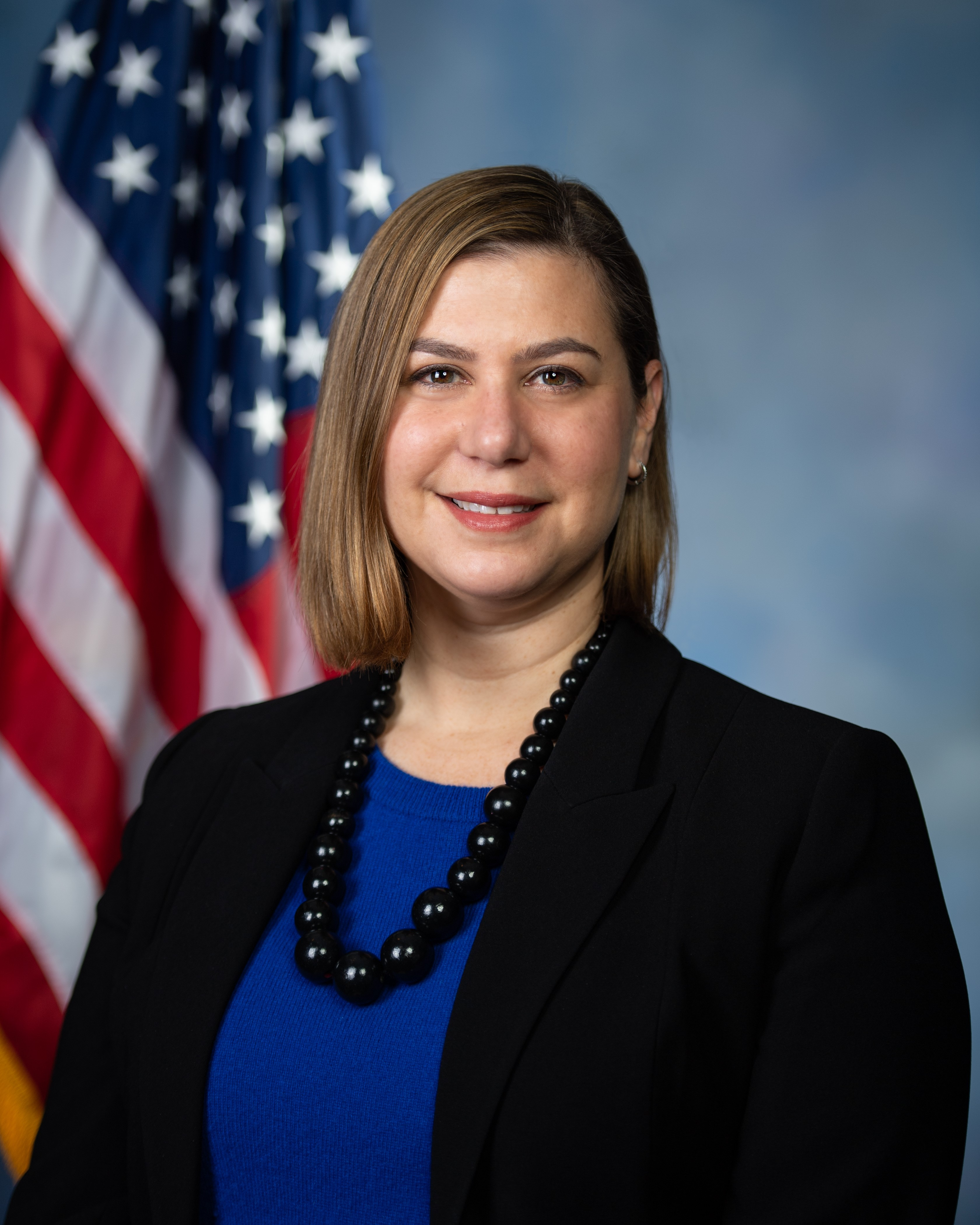
Elissa Slotkin

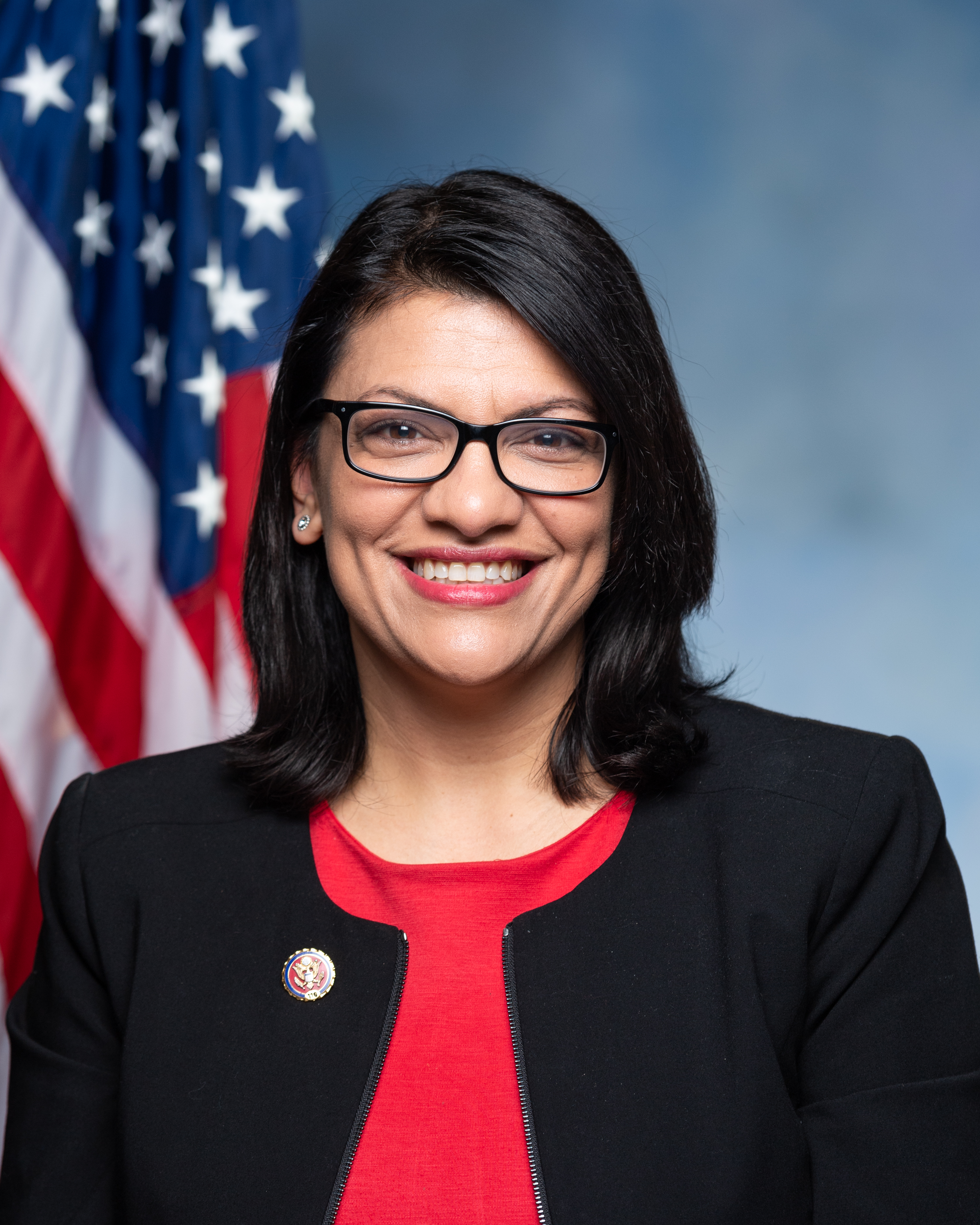
Rashida Tlaib

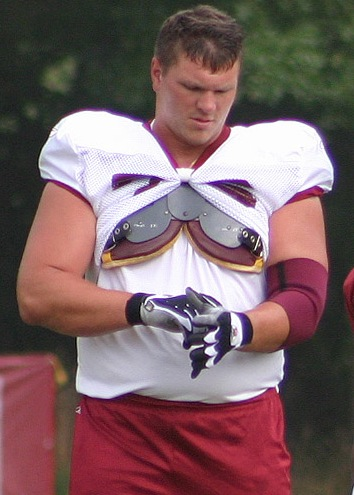
Jon Jansen

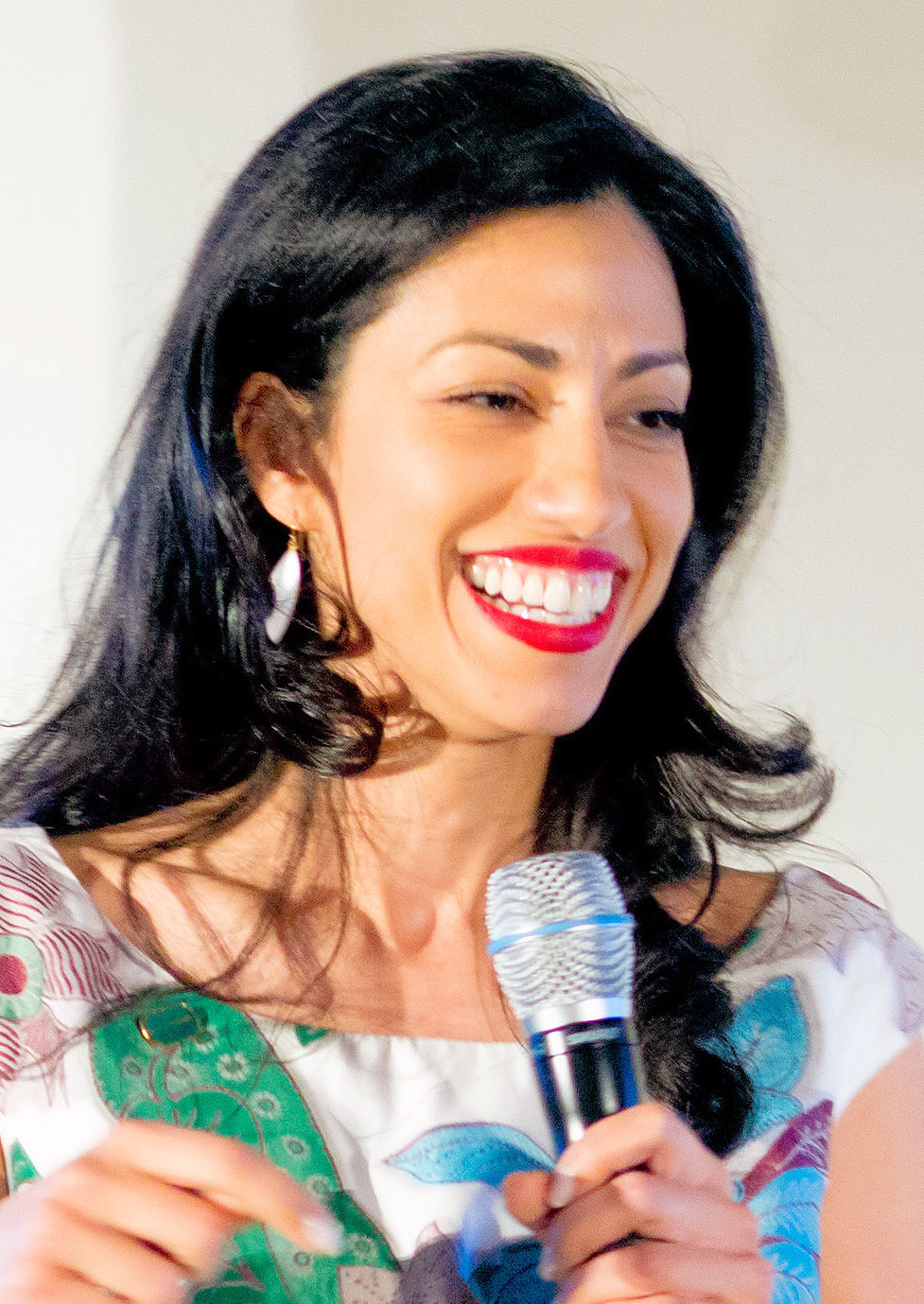
Huma Abedin

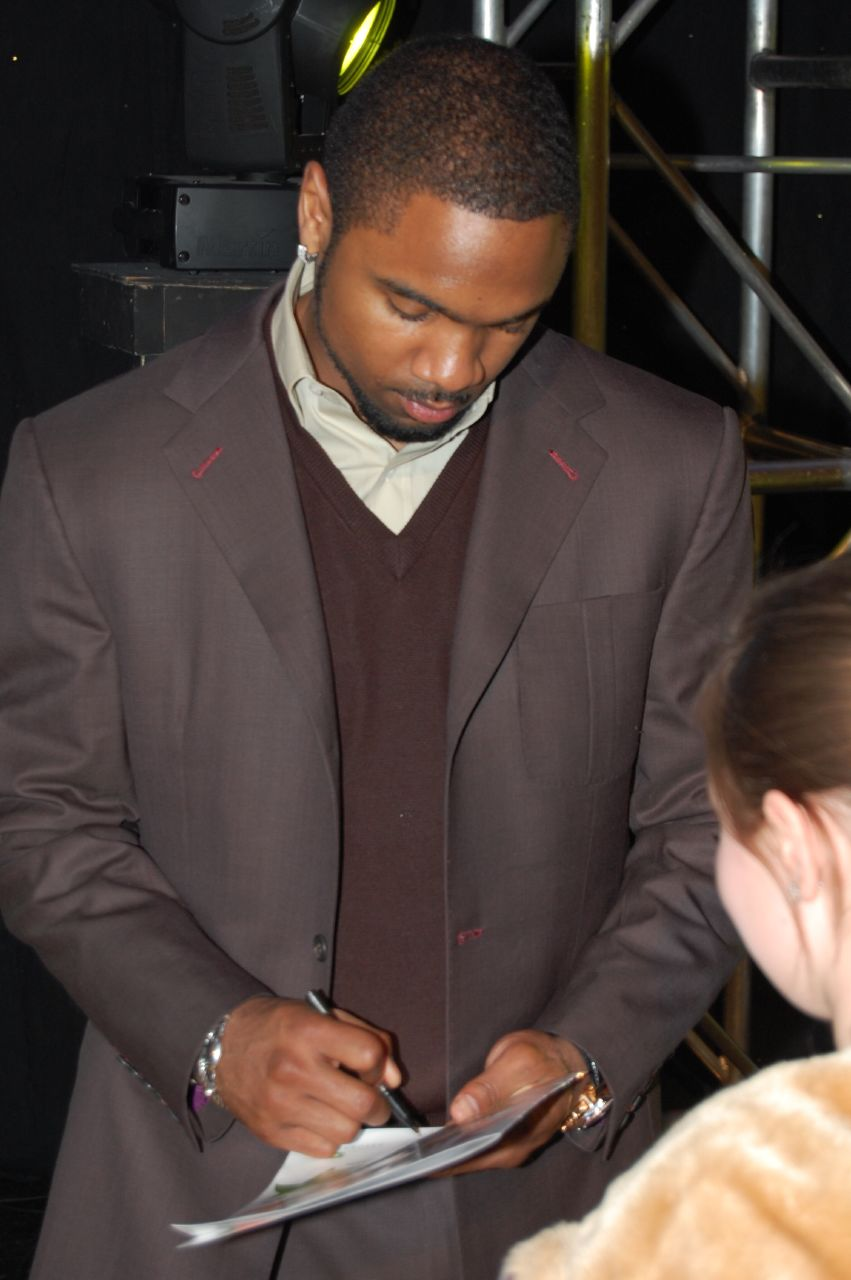
Charles Woodson

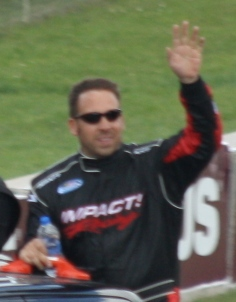
Andy Ponstein

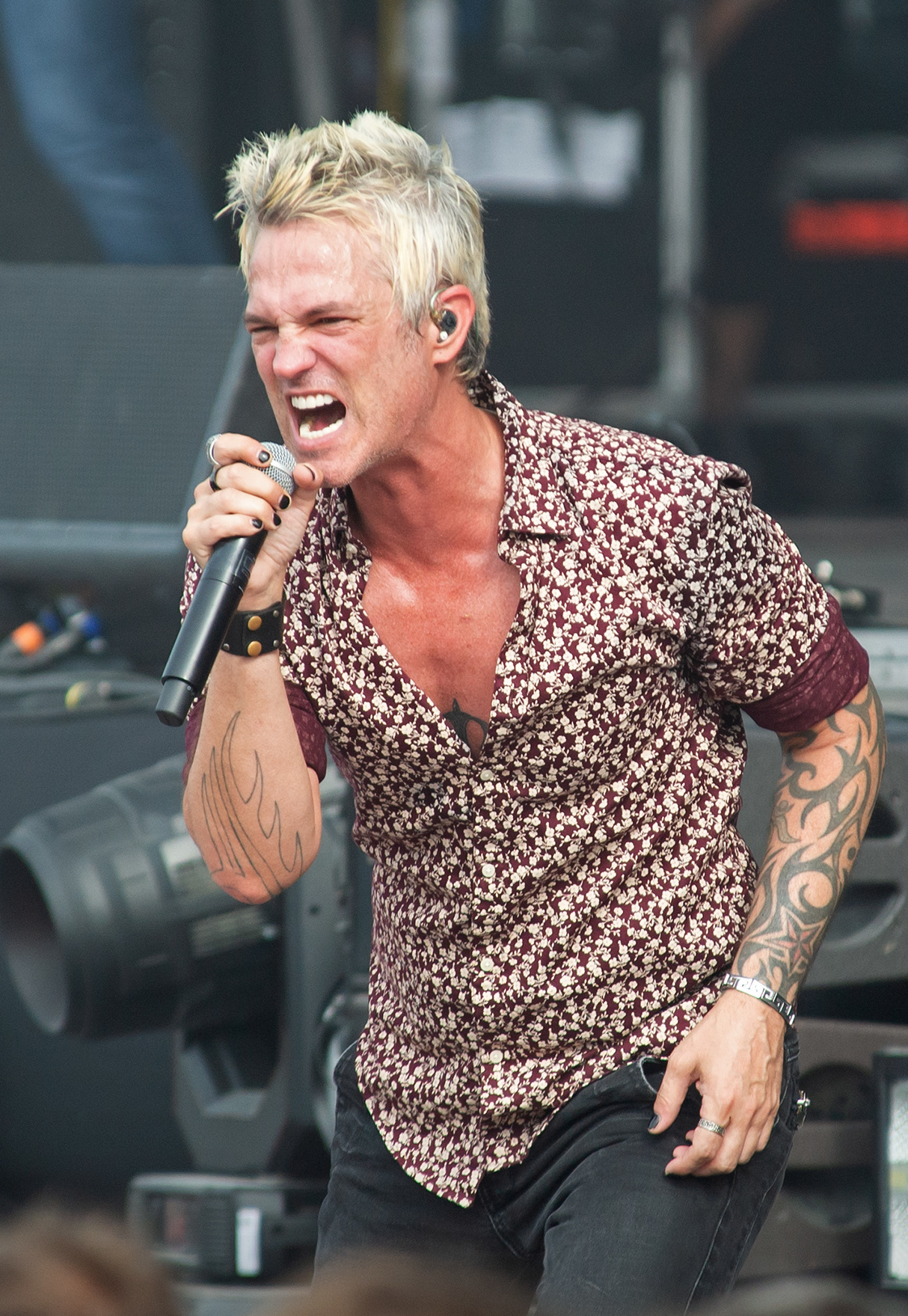
Jeff Gutt

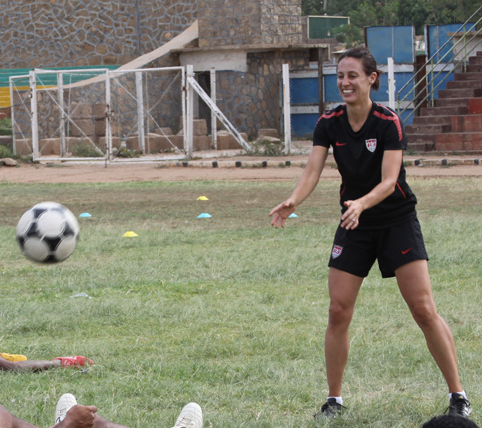
Kate Markgraf

== Deaths ==
- February 22 - Florence Ballard, founding member of The Supremes, of a heart attack at age 32 in Detroit
- March 10 - Haddon Sundblom, artist from Muskegon known for his images of Santa Claus created for The Coca-Cola Company, at age 76
- April 2 - Ray Teal, actor from Grand Rapids (Sheriff Roy Coffee on Bonanza), at age 74 in Santa Monica, California
- April - Myra Wolfgang, labor leader and women's rights activist, at age 61 in Detroit
- May 20 - Syd Howe, left wing for Detroit Red Wings (1934-1946) and member of the Hockey Hall of Fame, at age 64 in Ottawa, Ontario
- June 15 - Jimmy Dykes, Major League Baseball player (1918-1939), manager of Detroit Tigers (1959-1960), at age 79 in Philadelphia
- June 23 - DeHart Hubbard, the first black athlete to win a gold medal at the Olympics (long jump, 1924), at age 73 in Cleveland
- August 31 - Frederick H. Mueller, United States Secretary of Commerce (1959-1961), at age 82 in Grand Rapids, Michigan
- December 4 - Ace Gutowsky, NFL fullback (1932-1939) who held Detroit Lions career and single-season rushing records until the 1960s, at age 67 in Kingfisher, Oklahoma
- December 13 - Victor A. Knox, Congressman from Michigan's 11th District (1953-1965), at age 77 in Petoskey, Michigan
- December 26 - Philip Hart, U.S. Senator (1959-1976), from cancer at age 64 in Washington, D.C.

=== Gallery of 1976 deaths ===
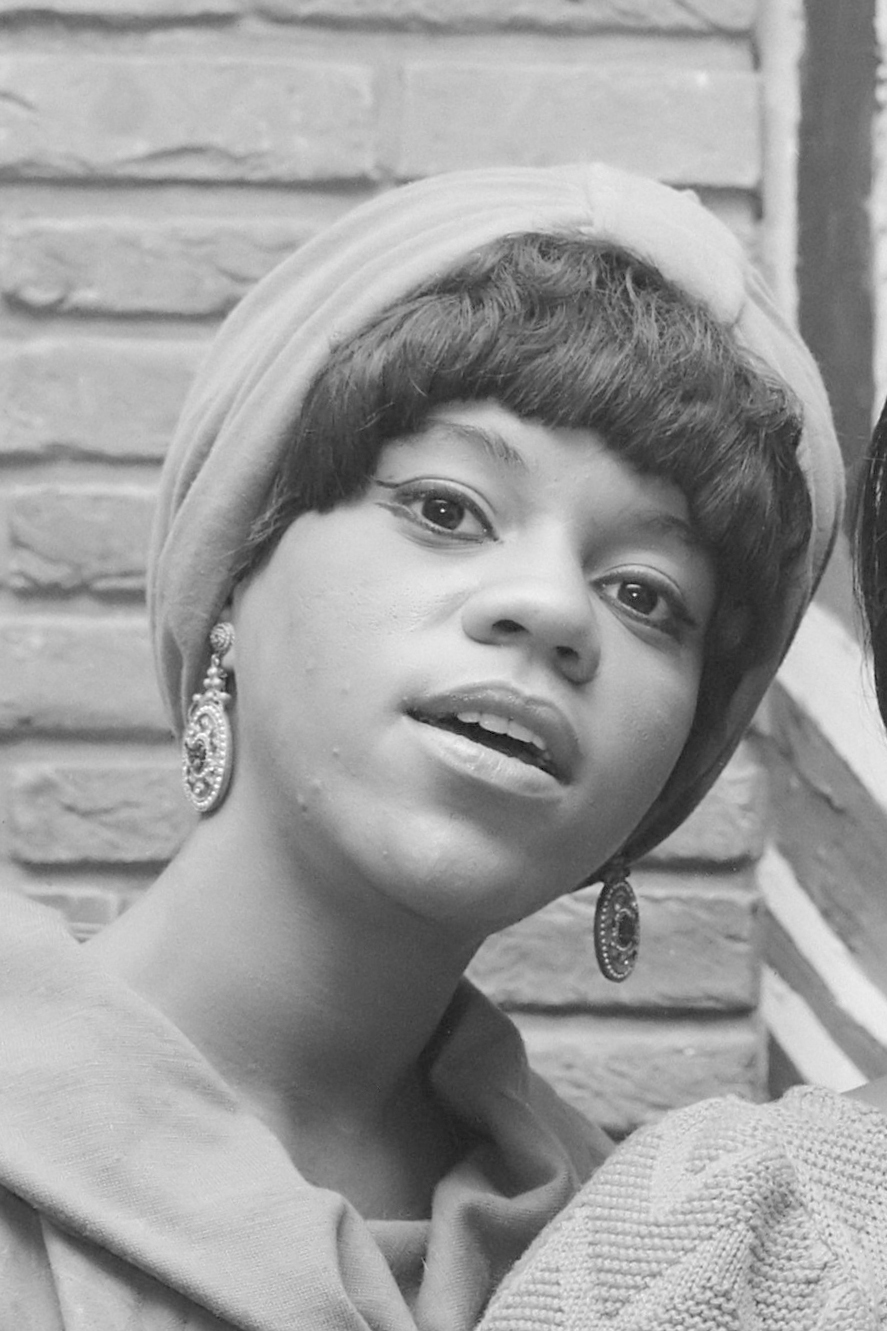
Florence Ballard

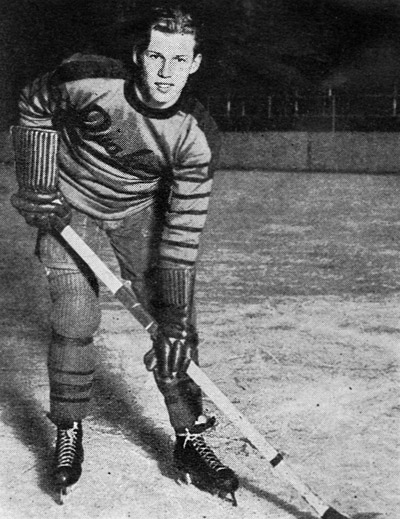
Syd Howe

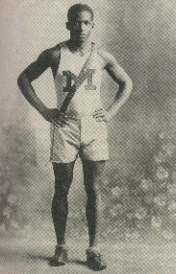
DeHart Hubbard

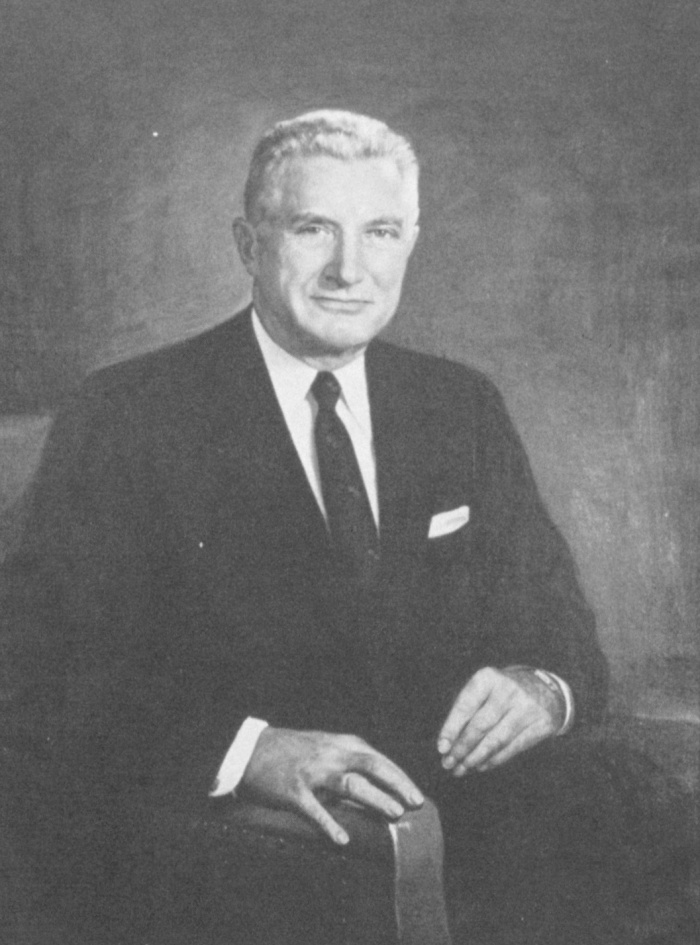
Frederick H. Mueller

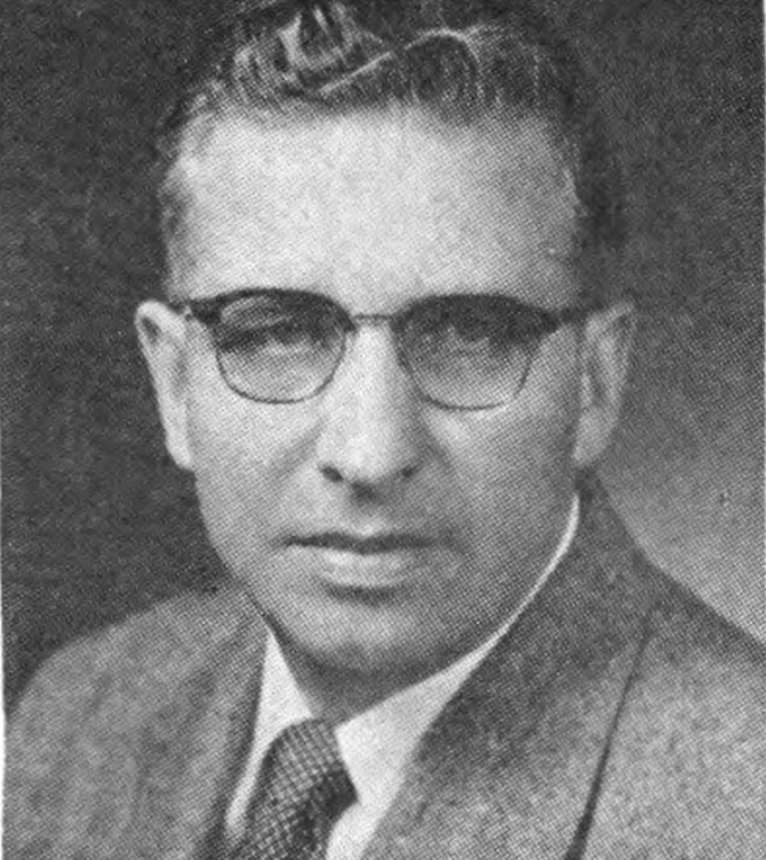
Victor A. Knox
