= 1977 in Michigan =

- Decades: 1950s; 1960s; 1970s; 1980s; 1990s
- See also: History of Michigan; Historical outline of Michigan; List of years in Michigan; 1977 in the United States

Events from the year 1977 in Michigan.

The Associated Press (AP) selected Michigan's top stories of 1977 as follows:

1. The emergence of the Michigan PBB contamination scandal as a political issue and related medical investigation and legislative actions (the PBB scandal was one of the state's top stories for the fourth consecutive year dating back to 1974);
2. Cold weather through the winter of 1977 with many cities recording the coldest temperatures of the century, Lake Michigan frozen solid, several deaths due to exposure, closure of automobile plants due to natural gas shortages, and snow closing U.S. Route 131 between Grand Rapids and Kalamazoo for a week;
3. The Oakland County Child Killings involving the unsolved murders of at least four Oakland County youths reportedly tied to the driver of a blue Gremlin;
4. The 13-week trial, conviction, and subsequent new trial order in the prosecution of two Filipina nurses, Filipina Narciso and Leonora Perez, in the Ann Arbor Hospital Murders in which 10 patients at the Veterans Hospital in Ann Arbor died mysteriously from respiratory failure (the Ann Arbor Hospital Murders were one of the state's top stories for the third consecutive year dating back to 1975);
5. The case of Francine Hughes (subsequently the topic of The Burning Bed), a 29-year-old woman from Danville who killed her husband by setting his bed on fire in March after years of domestic abuse and was found not guilty in November by reason of temporary insanity;
6. Gov. William Milliken's veto of Project Seafarer, a proposed underground military extremely low frequency (ELF) network in the Upper Peninsula;
7. A civil lawsuit by farmers Roy and Marilyn Tacoma against several parties for the loss of cattle in connection with the Michigan PBB contamination scandal (See #1 above) and resulting in the longest court case in Michigan history;
8. The August 25 abduction of Evelyn Van Tassel from her Upper Peninsula home and the subsequent trial and conviction of her abductor, Douglas Henry, for kidnapping and rape;
9. The closure of Kincheloe Air Force Base in the eastern Upper Peninsula; and
10. The April announcement by U.S. Senator Robert P. Griffin that he would not run for reelection in 1978.

The AP and the United Press International (UPI) each selected the state's top sports stories of 1977 as follows:

1. The second season of Detroit Tigers pitcher Mark Fidrych (2.89 ERA in 11 games) which was shortened by injuries (AP-1, UPI-1);
2. The 1977 Michigan Wolverines football team led by quarterback Rick Leach and running back Russell Davis compiling a 10–1 record in the regular season, including a victory over Ohio State (AP-3, UPI-3 [tie]);
3. The Detroit Red Wings' firing of Alex Delvecchio after the 1976–77 team compiled a 16–55–9 record, the hiring of Ted Lindsay as the team's general manager, and Lindsay's rebuilding program and promise to bring back aggressive hockey (AP-5, UPI-2);
4. The 1976–77 Detroit Titans men's basketball team led by John Long and Terry Tyler compiling a 25–4 record followed by Dick Vitale's resignation as head coach (AP-4 [season], AP-6 [resignation], UPI-5 [season]);
5. Magic Johnson's decision to attend Michigan State University after leading Lansing's Everett High School to the Michigan Class A high school basketball championship (AP-2, UPI-9);
6. The 1976–77 Michigan Wolverines men's basketball team led by Phil Hubbard and Rickey Green compiling a 26–4 record, receiving the No. 1 ranking at the end of the regular season, and advancing to the Elite Eight round in the NCAA tournament (AP-8, UPI-3 [tie])
7. The 1976 Michigan Wolverines football team's 14–6 loss to USC in the 1977 Rose Bowl (AP-7, UPI-7);
8. The performances of Detroit Tigers players Dave Rozema (15-7 record, 3.09 ERA), Ron LeFlore (.325 batting average, 212 hits), and Steve Kemp (18 home runs, 88 RBIs) (AP-9 [Rozema and LeFlore], UPI-8 [Rozema and Kemp]);
9. The trade of highly touted 1976 draft pick Marvin Barnes on November 23 after appearing in only 65 games for the Detroit Pistons to the Buffalo Braves in exchange for Gus Gerard, John Shumate and a 1979 first round draft pick (Roy Hamilton was selected) (UPI-6); and
10. The April 12 trade of designated hitter Willie Horton, who had played for the Detroit Tigers since 1963, to the Texas Rangers in exchange for pitcher Steve Foucault (UPI-10).

== Office holders ==
=== State office holders ===
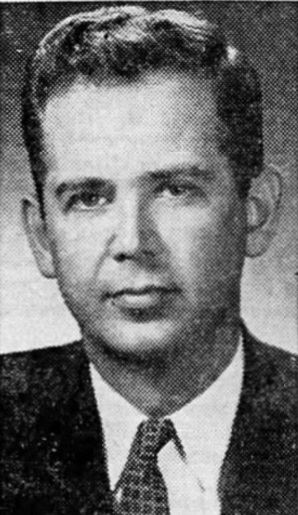
Gov. Milliken

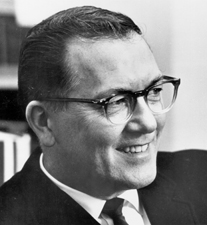
Sen. Griffin

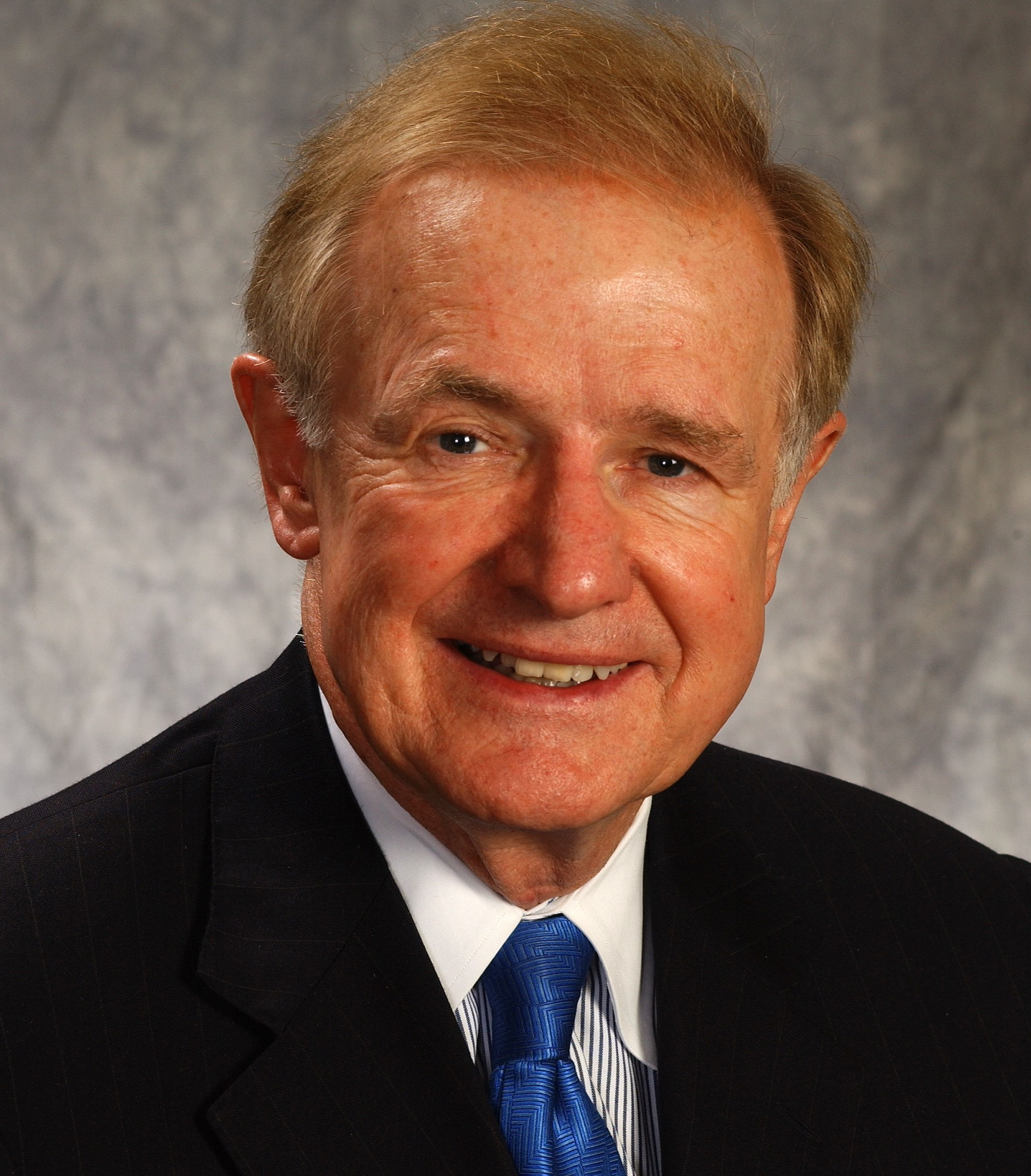
Sen. Riegle

- Governor of Michigan: William Milliken (Republican)
- Lieutenant Governor of Michigan: James Damman (Republican)
- Michigan Attorney General: Frank J. Kelley (Democrat)
- Michigan Secretary of State: Richard H. Austin (Democrat)
- Speaker of the Michigan House of Representatives: Bobby Crim (Democrat)
- Majority Leader of the Michigan Senate: William Faust (Democrat)
- Chief Justice, Michigan Supreme Court: Thomas G. Kavanagh

=== Mayors of major cities ===
- Mayor of Detroit: Coleman Young
- Mayor of Grand Rapids: Abe L. Drasin
- Mayor of Warren, Michigan: Ted Bates
- Mayor of Sterling Heights, Michigan: Anthony Dobry
- Mayor of Flint: James W. Rutherford
- Mayor of Dearborn: Orville L. Hubbard
- Mayor of Lansing: Gerald W. Graves
- Mayor of Ann Arbor: Albert Wheeler (Democrat)
- Mayor of Saginaw: Raymond M. Tortora/Joe Stephens

=== Federal office holders ===
- United States Senator from Michigan: Donald W. Riegle Jr. (Democrat)
- United States Senator from Michigan: Robert P. Griffin (Republican)
- United States Representative, District 1: John Conyers (Democrat)
- United States Representative, District 2: Carl Pursell (Republican)
- United States Representative, District 3: Garry E. Brown (Republican)
- United States Representative, District 4: David Stockman (Republican)
- United States Representative, District 5: Harold S. Sawyer (Republican)
- United States Representative, District 6: Bob Carr (Democrat)
- United States Representative, District 7: Dale Kildee (Democrat)
- United States Representative, District 8: J. Bob Traxler (Democrat)
- United States Representative, District 9: Guy Vander Jagt (Republican)
- United States Representative, District 10: Elford Albin Cederberg (Republican)
- United States Representative, District 11: Philip Ruppe (Republican)
- United States Representative, District 12: David Bonior (Democrat)
- United States Representative, District 13: Charles Diggs (Democrat)
- United States Representative, District 14: Lucien N. Nedzi (Democrat)
- United States Representative, District 15: William D. Ford (Democrat)
- United States Representative, District 16: John Dingell (Democrat)
- United States Representative, District 17: William M. Brodhead (Democrat)
- United States Representative, District 18: James Blanchard (Democrat)
- United States Representative, District 19: William Broomfield (Republican)

== Population ==
In the 1970 United States census, Michigan was recorded as having a population of 8,875,083 persons, ranking as the seventh most populous state in the country. By 1980, the state's population had grown 4.4% to 9,262,078 persons.

=== Cities ===
The following is a list of cities in Michigan with a population of at least 70,000 based on 1970 U.S. Census data. Historic census data from 1960 and 1980 is included to reflect trends in population increases or decreases. Cities that are part of the Detroit metropolitan area are shaded in tan.

1970 Rank	City	County	1960 Pop.	1970 Pop.	1980 Pop.	Change 1970-80
1	Detroit	Wayne	1,670,144	1,514,063	1,203,368	−20.5% ▼
2	Grand Rapids	Kent	177,313	197,649	181,843	−8.0% ▼
3	Flint	Genesee	196,940	193,317	159,611	−17.4% ▼
4	Warren	Macomb	89,246	179,260	161,134	−10.1% ▼
5	Lansing	Ingham	107,807	131,403	130,414	−0.8% ▼
6	Livonia	Wayne	66,702	110,109	104,814	−4.8% ▼
7	Dearborn	Wayne	112,007	104,199	90,660	−13.0% ▼
8	Ann Arbor	Washtenaw	67,340	100,035	107,969	7.9% ▲
9	Saginaw	Saginaw	98,265	91,849	77,508	−15.6% ▼
10	St. Clair Shores	Macomb	76,657	88,093	76,210	−13.5% ▼
11	Westland	Wayne	60,743	86,749	84,603	−2.5% ▼
12	Royal Oak	Oakland	80,612	86,238	70,893	−17.8% ▼
13	Kalamazoo	Kalamazoo	82,089	85,555	79,722	−6.8% ▼
14	Pontiac	Oakland	82,233	85,279	76,715	−10.0% ▼
15	Dearborn Heights	Wayne	61,118	80,069	67,706	−15.4% ▼
16	Taylor	Wayne	na	70,020	77,568	10.8% ▲

=== Counties ===
The following is a list of counties in Michigan with populations of at least 120,000 based on 1970 U.S. Census data. Historic census data from 1960 and 1980 are included to reflect trends in population increases or decreases. Counties that are part of the Detroit metropolitan area are shaded in tan.

1970 Rank	County	Largest city	1960 Pop.	1970 Pop.	1980 Pop.	Change 1970-80
1	Wayne	Detroit	2,666,297	2,666,751	2,337,891	−12.3% ▼
2	Oakland	Pontiac	690,259	907,871	1,011,793	11.4% ▲
3	Macomb	Warren	405,804	625,309	694,600	11.1% ▲
4	Genesee	Flint	374,313	444,341	450,449	1.4% ▲
5	Kent	Grand Rapids	363,187	411,044	444,506	8.1% ▲
6	Ingham	Lansing	211,296	261,039	275,520	5.5% ▲
7	Washtenaw	Ann Arbor	172,440	234,103	264,748	13.1% ▲
8	Saginaw	Saginaw	190,752	219,743	228,059	3.8% ▲
9	Kalamazoo	Kalamazoo	169,712	201,550	212,378	5.4% ▲
10	Berrien	Benton Harbor	149,865	163,875	171,276	4.5% ▲
11	Muskegon	Muskegon	129,943	157,426	157,589	0.1% ▲
12	Jackson	Jackson	131,994	143,274	151,495	5.7% ▲
13	Calhoun	Battle Creek	138,858	141,963	141,557	−0.3% ▼
14	Ottawa	Holland	98,719	128,181	157,174	22.6% ▲
15	St. Clair	Port Huron	107,201	120,175	138,802	15.5% ▲
16	Monroe	Monroe	101,120	118,479	134,659	13.7% ▲
17	Bay	Bay City	107,042	117,339	119,881	2.2% ▲

== Sports ==
=== Baseball ===
- 1977 Detroit Tigers season – Under manager Ralph Houk, the Tigers compiled a 74–88 record and finished fourth in the American League East. The team's statistical leaders included Ron LeFlore with a .325 batting average, Jason Thompson with 31 home runs and 105 RBIs, Dave Rozema with 15 wins, and Mark Fidrych with a 2.89 earned run average (ERA).
- 1977 Michigan Wolverines baseball team - Under head coach Moby Benedict, the Wolverines compiled a 33–15 record and finished second in the Big Ten Conference.

=== American football ===
- 1977 Detroit Lions season – The Lions, under head coach Tommy Hudspeth, compiled a 6–8 record and finished in third place in the NFL's Central Division. The team's statistical leaders included Greg Landry with 1,359 passing yards, Horace King with 521 rushing yards, David Hill with 465 receiving yards, and Steve Mike-Mayer with 43 points scored.
- 1977 Michigan Wolverines football team – Under head coach Bo Schembechler, the Wolverines compiled a 10–2 record and were ranked No. 9 in the final AP Poll. The team's statistical leaders included Rick Leach with 1,109 passing yards, Russell Davis with 1,013 rushing yards and 96 points scored, and Ralph Clayton with 393 receiving yards.
- 1977 Michigan State Spartans football team – Under head coach Darryl Rogers, the Spartans compiled a 7–3–1 record. The team's statistical leaders included Ed Smith with 1,731 passing yards, Leroy McGee with 720 rushing yards, and Kirk Gibson with 531 receiving yards.
- 1977 Central Michigan Chippewas football team – Under head coach Roy Kramer, the Chippewas compiled a 10–1 record.
- 1977 Eastern Michigan Hurons football team – Under head coach Ed Chlebek, the Hurons compiled an 8–3 record.
- 1977 Western Michigan Broncos football team – Under head coach Elliot Uzelac, the Broncos compiled a 4–7 record.

=== Basketball ===
- 1976–77 Detroit Pistons season – Under head coach Herb Brown, the Pistons compiled a 44–38 record and finished second in the NBA's Midwest Division. The team's statistical leaders included Bob Lanier with 1,616 points and 745 rebounds and Kevin Porter with 592 assists.
- 1976–77 Michigan Wolverines men's basketball team – Under head coach Johnny Orr, the Wolverines compiled a 26–4 record. The team's statistical leaders included Rickey Green with 120 assists and Phil Hubbard with 588 points and 389 rebounds.
- 1976–77 Detroit Titans men's basketball team – The Titans compiled a 25–4 record under head coach Dick Vitale. The team's statistical leaders included John Long with 568 points and Terry Tyler with 319 rebounds.

=== Ice hockey ===
- 1976–77 Detroit Red Wings season – Under head coach Alex Delvecchio and Larry Wilson, the Red Wings compiled a 16–55–9 record and finished fifth in the National Hockey League's Norris Division. Walt McKechnie led the team with 25 goals, 34 assists and 59 points. The team's regular goaltenders were Jim Rutherford and Eddie Giacomin.
- 1976–77 Michigan Wolverines men's ice hockey season – Under head coach Dan Farrell, the Wolverines compiled a 28–17 record and finished second at the 1977 NCAA Division I Men's Ice Hockey Tournament, losing to Wisconsin in the title game.
- 1976–77 Michigan Tech Huskies men's ice hockey team – Under head coach John MacInnes, Michigan Tech compiled a 19–18–1 record and finished second in the 1977 NCAA Division I Men's Ice Hockey Tournament, losing to Minnesota in the title game.
- 1976–77 Michigan State Spartans men's ice hockey team – Under head coach Amo Bessone, the Spartans compiled a 14–21–1 record.
- Great Lakes Invitational -

== Music ==
Albums and singles by Michigan artists or centered on Michigan topics that were released or became hits in 1977 include the following:

- "Sir Duke", a single by Detroit native Stevie Wonder, was released in March 1977, reached No. 1 on the Billboard Hot 100, and was ranked No. 18 on the Billboard Year-End Hot 100 singles of 1977.
- "I Wish", a single by Stevie Wonder, was released in November 1976, reached No. 1 on the Billboard Hot 100, and was ranked No. 51 on the Billboard Year-End Hot 100 singles of 1977.
- "Hotel California", a single with lyrics by Detroit native Glenn Frey, was released in February 1977, reached No. 1 on the Billboard Hot 100, and was ranked No. 19 on the Billboard Year-End Hot 100 singles of 1977.
- "New Kid in Town", co-written by Detroit natives Glenn Frey and JD Souther (with Don Henley), was released in December 1976 and became a hit in 1977, reaching No. 1 on the Billboard Hot 100, and ranking No. 59 on the Billboard Year-End Hot 100 singles of 1977.
- "Night Moves", a single by Detroit native Bob Seger, was released in December 1976, reached No. 4 on the Billboard Hot 100, and was ranked No. 55 on the Billboard Year-End Hot 100 singles of 1977.
- "Rock and Roll Never Forgets", a single from Bob Seger, was released in June 1977. Though it only reached No. 41 on the Billboard Hot 100, it became a staple of classic rock radio.
- Cat Scratch Fever, the third studio album from Ted Nugent, was released in May 1977. It reached No. 17 on the Billboard album chart and was certified platinum. The album included the single "Cat Scratch Fever" that reached No. 30 on the Billboard Hot 100. In 2009, the single was named the 32nd best hard rock song of all time by VH1.
- Lust for Life, an album by Michigan native Iggy Pop written and recorded with David Bowie, was released in February 1977. It included the classic songs "Lust for Life" and "The Passenger".
- The Idiot, an Iggy Pop album written and recorded with David Bowie, was released in March 1977. It included the songs "China Girl", "Funtime", and "Nightclubbing".
- "You and Me", a single by Detroit native Alice Cooper, was released in April 1977, reached No. 9 on the Billboard Hot 100, and was ranked No. 48 on the Billboard Year-End Hot 100 singles of 1977.
- "I Never Cry", a single by Alice Cooper, was released in July 1976, became a hit in 1977, and was ranked No. 82 on the Billboard Year-End Hot 100 singles of 1977.
- Sweet Passion, a studio album from Aretha Franklin, was released in May 1977. The single "Break It to Me Gently" which reached No. 1 on the Hot Soul Singles chart.
- An Evening with Diana Ross, a live album by Detroit native Diana Ross, was released in January 1977 and reached No. 29 on the Billboard album chart.
- Baby It's Me, an album from Diana Ross, was released in September 1977, and reached No. 18 on the Billboard album chart. It included the hit single "Gettin' Ready for Love".
- Deep in My Soul, an album by Smokey Robinson, was released in January 1977.

== Births ==
- February 22 - J. J. Putz, Major League Baseball relief pitcher (2003-2014), in Trenton, Michigan
- February 24 - Floyd Mayweather Jr., professional boxer and boxing promoter, in Grand Rapids
- March 25 - Brian Calley, Michigan Lieutenant Governor (2011–2018), in Dearborn, Michigan
- September 7 - Mateen Cleaves, basketball player at Michigan State and professionally (1996-2009), in Flint, Michigan
- September 21 - Jeff Backus, NFL offensive lineman (2001-2012), in Midland, Michigan
- September 26 - Kevin Cotter, 72nd Speaker of the Michigan House of Representatives (2015-2017)
- October 22 - Jocelyn Benson, 43rd Michigan Secretary of State (2019–present)
- December 30 - Kenyon Martin, NBA basketball player (2000-2015), in Saginaw, Michigan

=== Gallery of 1977 births ===
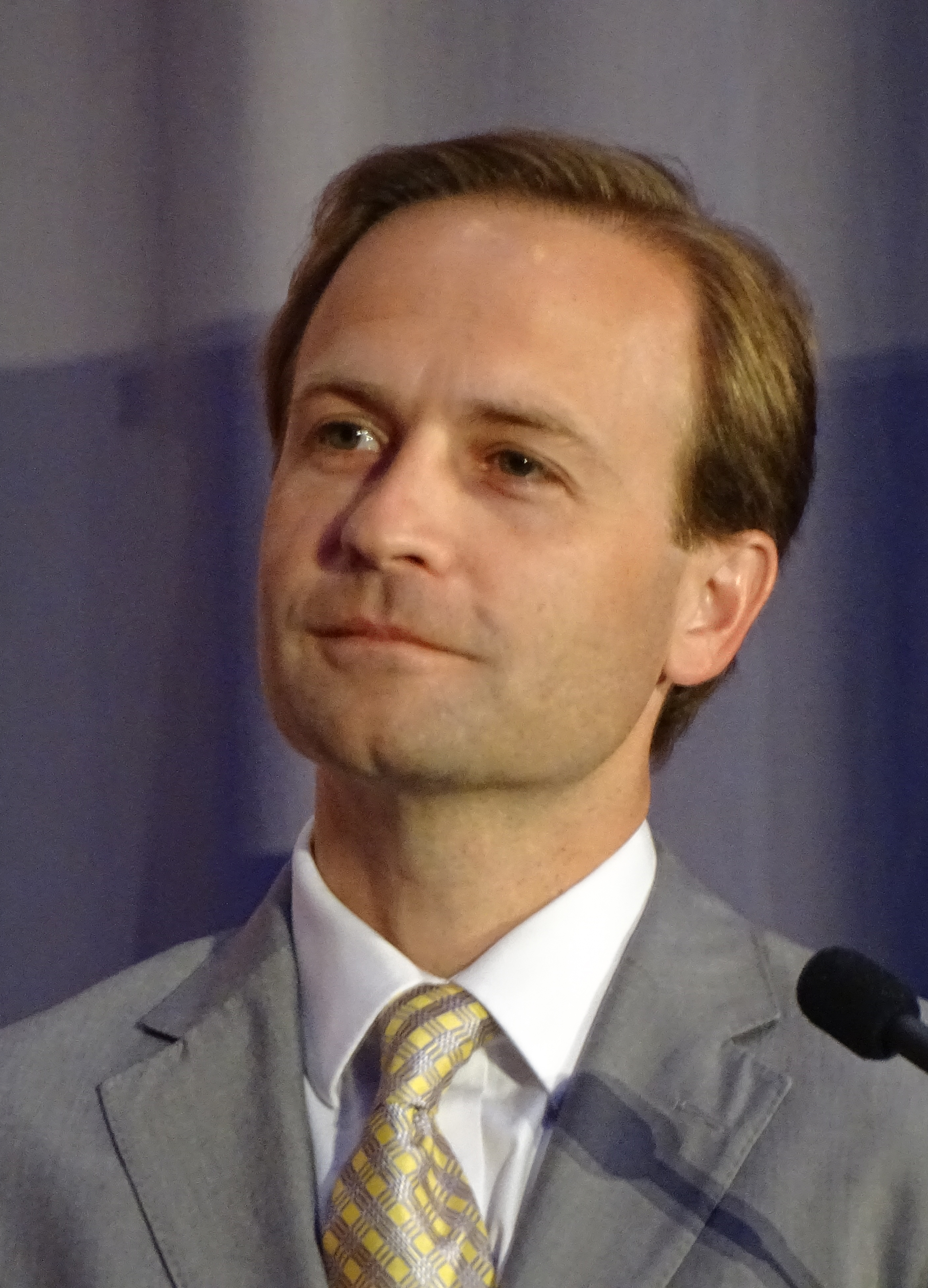
Brian Calley

== Deaths ==
- March 3 - Stubby Overmire, Major League Baseball pitcher (1943-1952), at age 57 in Lakeland, Florida

=== Gallery of 1977 deaths ===
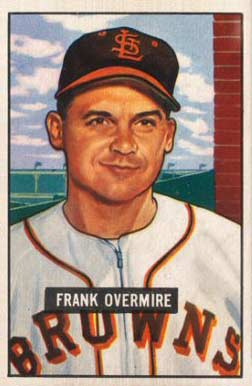
Stubby Overmire
