= 1978 in Michigan =

- Decades: 1950s; 1960s; 1970s; 1980s; 1990s
- See also: History of Michigan; Historical outline of Michigan; List of years in Michigan; 1978 in the United States

Events from the year 1978 in Michigan.

The Associated Press (AP) rated the top Michigan news stories of 1978 as follows:

1. The Great Blizzard of 1978 leaving 400,000 homes and businesses without power;
2. The passage of one of three tax proposals on the November ballot—a measure requiring voter approval for new tax increases above authorized levels;
3. The reelection of William Milliken as Governor, easily defeating challenger William Fitzgerald, and Carl Levin's defeat of Robert P. Griffin in the election for a U.S. Senate seat from Michigan;
4. The ruling of Wexford County Circuit Judge William Peterson dismissing all charges against three defendants in the first PBB lawsuit, a 14-month trial that was the longest in Michigan history;
5. The recall of 1.5 million pre-1977 Ford Pintos for modifications to the fuel tanks;
6. The passage of a ballot proposal in November increasing Michigan's legal drinking age to 21;
7. The implementation of Michigan's deposit law following the 1976 measure banning throwaway bottles and cans;
8. Disclosures of patient abuse at Michigan's state mental health facilities beginning with a series of articles published in February in the Detroit Free Press and resulting in the resignation of the state's mental health director;
9. The conviction of Congressman Charles Diggs for mail fraud and making false statements in connection with a scheme in which staffers were required to kick back a portion of their pay to Diggs; and
10. The passage of $168.5 million in transportation spending funded by an additional two cent per gallon tax on gasoline and increased vehicle registration fees.

The AP also selected the state's top sports stories as follows:

1. The 1977–78 Detroit Red Wings season which rebounded from the worst record in the NHL one year earlier and won a berth in the playoffs for the first time in a decade;
2. The 1977–78 Michigan State Spartans men's basketball team led by Magic Johnson and Greg Kelser that compiled a 25–5 record, won the Big Ten Conference championship, and advanced to the Elite Eight round of the NCAA tournament;
3. Michigan State's upset victory on October 14 over Michigan in football;
4. Improvements in the Detroit Lions under head coach Monte Clark;
5. The hiring of Dick Vitale as head coach of the Detroit Pistons;
6. The selection of Detroit Tigers second baseman Lou Whitaker as the American League Rookie of the Year;
7. The resignation of Ralph Houk as manager of the Detroit Tigers;
8. Rick Leach finishing his four-year career as Michigan's quarterback;
9. The Detroit Tigers' signing of Michigan State football star Kirk Gibson; and
10. Former Dearborn prep player Gary Danielson taking over as quarterback of the Detroit Lions.

== Office holders ==
=== State office holders ===
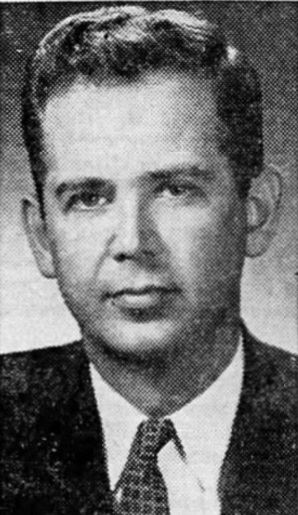
Gov. Milliken

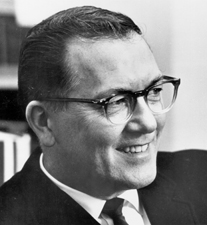
Sen. Griffin

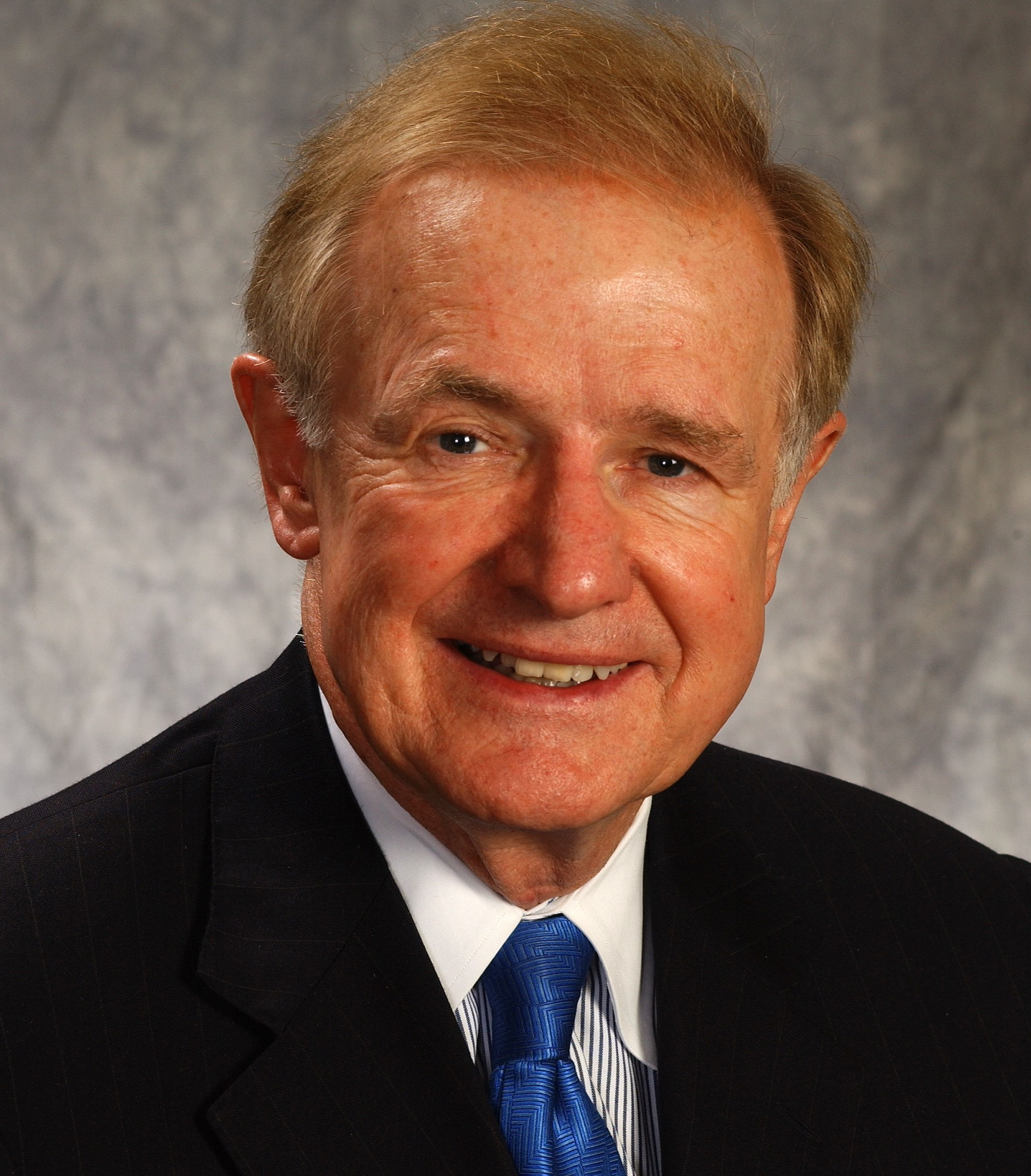
Sen. Riegle

- Governor of Michigan: William Milliken (Republican)
- Lieutenant Governor of Michigan: James Damman (Republican)
- Michigan Attorney General: Frank J. Kelley (Democrat)
- Michigan Secretary of State: Richard H. Austin (Democrat)
- Speaker of the Michigan House of Representatives: Bobby Crim (Democrat)
- Majority Leader of the Michigan Senate: William Faust (Democrat)
- Chief Justice, Michigan Supreme Court: Thomas G. Kavanagh

=== Mayors of major cities ===
- Mayor of Detroit: Coleman Young
- Mayor of Grand Rapids: Abe L. Drasin
- Mayor of Warren, Michigan: Ted Bates
- Mayor of Sterling Heights, Michigan: Anthony Dobry
- Mayor of Flint: James W. Rutherford
- Mayor of Dearborn: Orville L. Hubbard/John O'Reilly, Sr.
- Mayor of Lansing: Gerald W. Graves
- Mayor of Ann Arbor: Albert Wheeler (Democrat) / Louis Belcher (Republican)
- Mayor of Saginaw: Joe Stephens

=== Federal office holders ===
- United States Senator from Michigan: Donald W. Riegle Jr. (Democrat)
- United States Senator from Michigan: Robert P. Griffin (Republican)
- United States Representative, District 1: John Conyers (Democrat)
- United States Representative, District 2: Carl Pursell (Republican)
- United States Representative, District 3: Garry E. Brown (Republican)
- United States Representative, District 4: David Stockman (Republican)
- United States Representative, District 5: Harold S. Sawyer (Republican)
- United States Representative, District 6: Bob Carr (Democrat)
- United States Representative, District 7: Dale Kildee (Democrat)
- United States Representative, District 8: J. Bob Traxler (Democrat)
- United States Representative, District 9: Guy Vander Jagt (Republican)
- United States Representative, District 10: Elford Albin Cederberg (Republican)
- United States Representative, District 11: Philip Ruppe (Republican)
- United States Representative, District 12: David Bonior (Democrat)
- United States Representative, District 13: Charles Diggs (Democrat)
- United States Representative, District 14: Lucien N. Nedzi (Democrat)
- United States Representative, District 15: William D. Ford (Democrat)
- United States Representative, District 16: John Dingell (Democrat)
- United States Representative, District 17: William M. Brodhead (Democrat)
- United States Representative, District 18: James Blanchard (Democrat)
- United States Representative, District 19: William Broomfield (Republican)

== Population ==
In the 1970 United States census, Michigan was recorded as having a population of 8,875,083 persons, ranking as the seventh most populous state in the country. By 1980, the state's population had grown 4.4% to 9,262,078 persons.

=== Cities ===
The following is a list of cities in Michigan with a population of at least 70,000 based on 1970 U.S. Census data. Historic census data from 1960 and 1980 is included to reflect trends in population increases or decreases. Cities that are part of the Detroit metropolitan area are shaded in tan.

1970 Rank	City	County	1960 Pop.	1970 Pop.	1980 Pop.	Change 1970-80
1	Detroit	Wayne	1,670,144	1,514,063	1,203,368	−20.5% ▼
2	Grand Rapids	Kent	177,313	197,649	181,843	−8.0% ▼
3	Flint	Genesee	196,940	193,317	159,611	−17.4% ▼
4	Warren	Macomb	89,246	179,260	161,134	−10.1% ▼
5	Lansing	Ingham	107,807	131,403	130,414	−0.8% ▼
6	Livonia	Wayne	66,702	110,109	104,814	−4.8% ▼
7	Dearborn	Wayne	112,007	104,199	90,660	−13.0% ▼
8	Ann Arbor	Washtenaw	67,340	100,035	107,969	7.9% ▲
9	Saginaw	Saginaw	98,265	91,849	77,508	−15.6% ▼
10	St. Clair Shores	Macomb	76,657	88,093	76,210	−13.5% ▼
11	Westland	Wayne	60,743	86,749	84,603	−2.5% ▼
12	Royal Oak	Oakland	80,612	86,238	70,893	−17.8% ▼
13	Kalamazoo	Kalamazoo	82,089	85,555	79,722	−6.8% ▼
14	Pontiac	Oakland	82,233	85,279	76,715	−10.0% ▼
15	Dearborn Heights	Wayne	61,118	80,069	67,706	−15.4% ▼
16	Taylor	Wayne	na	70,020	77,568	10.8% ▲

=== Counties ===
The following is a list of counties in Michigan with populations of at least 120,000 based on 1970 U.S. Census data. Historic census data from 1960 and 1980 are included to reflect trends in population increases or decreases. Counties that are part of the Detroit metropolitan area are shaded in tan.

1970 Rank	County	Largest city	1960 Pop.	1970 Pop.	1980 Pop.	Change 1970-80
1	Wayne	Detroit	2,666,297	2,666,751	2,337,891	−12.3% ▼
2	Oakland	Pontiac	690,259	907,871	1,011,793	11.4% ▲
3	Macomb	Warren	405,804	625,309	694,600	11.1% ▲
4	Genesee	Flint	374,313	444,341	450,449	1.4% ▲
5	Kent	Grand Rapids	363,187	411,044	444,506	8.1% ▲
6	Ingham	Lansing	211,296	261,039	275,520	5.5% ▲
7	Washtenaw	Ann Arbor	172,440	234,103	264,748	13.1% ▲
8	Saginaw	Saginaw	190,752	219,743	228,059	3.8% ▲
9	Kalamazoo	Kalamazoo	169,712	201,550	212,378	5.4% ▲
10	Berrien	Benton Harbor	149,865	163,875	171,276	4.5% ▲
11	Muskegon	Muskegon	129,943	157,426	157,589	0.1% ▲
12	Jackson	Jackson	131,994	143,274	151,495	5.7% ▲
13	Calhoun	Battle Creek	138,858	141,963	141,557	−0.3% ▼
14	Ottawa	Holland	98,719	128,181	157,174	22.6% ▲
15	St. Clair	Port Huron	107,201	120,175	138,802	15.5% ▲
16	Monroe	Monroe	101,120	118,479	134,659	13.7% ▲
17	Bay	Bay City	107,042	117,339	119,881	2.2% ▲

== Sports ==
=== Baseball ===
- 1978 Detroit Tigers season – Under manager Ralph Houk, the Tigers compiled an 86–76 record and finished fifth in the American League East. The team's statistical leaders included Ron LeFlore with a .297 batting average, Jason Thompson with 26 home runs, Rusty Staub with 121 RBIs, Jim Slaton with 17 wins, and John Hiller with a 2.34 earned run average (ERA).

=== American football ===
- 1978 Detroit Lions season – The Lions, under head coach Monte Clark, compiled a 7–9 record and finished in third place in the NFL's Central Division. The team's statistical leaders included Gary Danielson with 2,294 passing yards, Dexter Bussey with 924 rushing yards, David Hill with 633 receiving yards, and Benny Ricardo with 92 points scored.
- 1978 Michigan Wolverines football team – Under head coach Bo Schembechler, the Wolverines compiled a 10–2 record and were ranked No. 5 in the final AP Poll. The team's statistical leaders included Rick Leach with 1,283 passing yards and 72 points scored, Harlan Huckleby with 741 rushing yards, and Ralph Clayton with 546 receiving yards.
- 1978 Michigan State Spartans football team – Under head coach Darryl Rogers, the Spartans compiled an 8–3 record and were ranked No. 12 in the final AP Poll. The team's statistical leaders included Ed Smith with 2,226 passing yards, Steve Smith with 772 rushing yards, and Kirk Gibson with 806 receiving yards.

=== Basketball ===
- 1977–78 Detroit Pistons season – Under head coaches Herb Brown and Bob Kaufman, the Pistons compiled a 38–44 record and finished fourth in the NBA's Midwest Division. The team's statistical leaders included Bob Lanier with 1,542 points and 715 rebounds and Chris Ford with 381 assists.
- 1977–78 Michigan State Spartans men's basketball team – Under head coach Jud Heathcote, the Spartans compiled a 25–5 record and won the Big Ten Conference championship. The team's statistical leaders included Greg Kelser with 531 points and 274 rebounds and Magic Johnson with 222 assists.
- 1977–78 Detroit Titans men's basketball team – The Titans compiled a 25–4 record under head coach Smokey Gaines.
- 1977–78 Michigan Wolverines men's basketball team – Under head coach Johnny Orr, the Wolverines compiled a 16–11 record.

=== Ice hockey ===
- 1977–78 Detroit Red Wings season – Under head coach Bobby Kromm, the Red Wings compiled a 32–34–14 record and finished second in the National Hockey League's Norris Division. Dale McCourt led the team with 33 goals and 72 points, and Reed Larson led with 41 assists. The team's regular goaltenders were Jim Rutherford and Ron Low.

== Music ==
Albums and singles by Michigan artists or centered on Michigan topics that were released or became hits in 1978 include the following:

- Stranger in Town, the 10th studio album by Detroit native Bob Seger, was released in May 1978. It reached No. 4 on the Billboard album chart and was certified platinum. It included four hit singles: "Hollywood Nights" (No. 12 Billboard Hot 100), "Still the Same" (No. 4 Billboard Hot 100), "Old Time Rock and Roll" (No. 28 Billboard Hot 100), and "We've Got Tonight" (No. 13 Billboard Hot 100). Still the Same ranked No. 52 on the Billboard Year-End Hot 100 singles of 1978; Hollywood Nights ranked No. 99.
- Weekend Warriors, the fourth studio album by Redford native Ted Nugent, was released in September 1978 and reached No. 24 on the Billboard album chart. It included the single "Need You Bad".
- Ross, an album by Detroit native Diana Ross, was released in September 1978, and reached No. 49 on the Billboard album chart.
- From the Inside, the fourth solo album by Detroit native Alice Cooper, was released in November 1978. It included the hit single "How You Gonna See Me Now".
- Almighty Fire, an album by Aretha Franklin, was released in April 1978. It peaked at No. 83 on the Billboard album chart.
- Love Breeze, an album by Detroit native Smokey Robinson, was released in February 1978. It reached No. 19 on the R&B album chart.

== Births ==
- January 26 - Corina Morariu, tennis player and winner of Wimbledon women's doubles title in 1999, in Detroit

=== Gallery of 1978 births ===
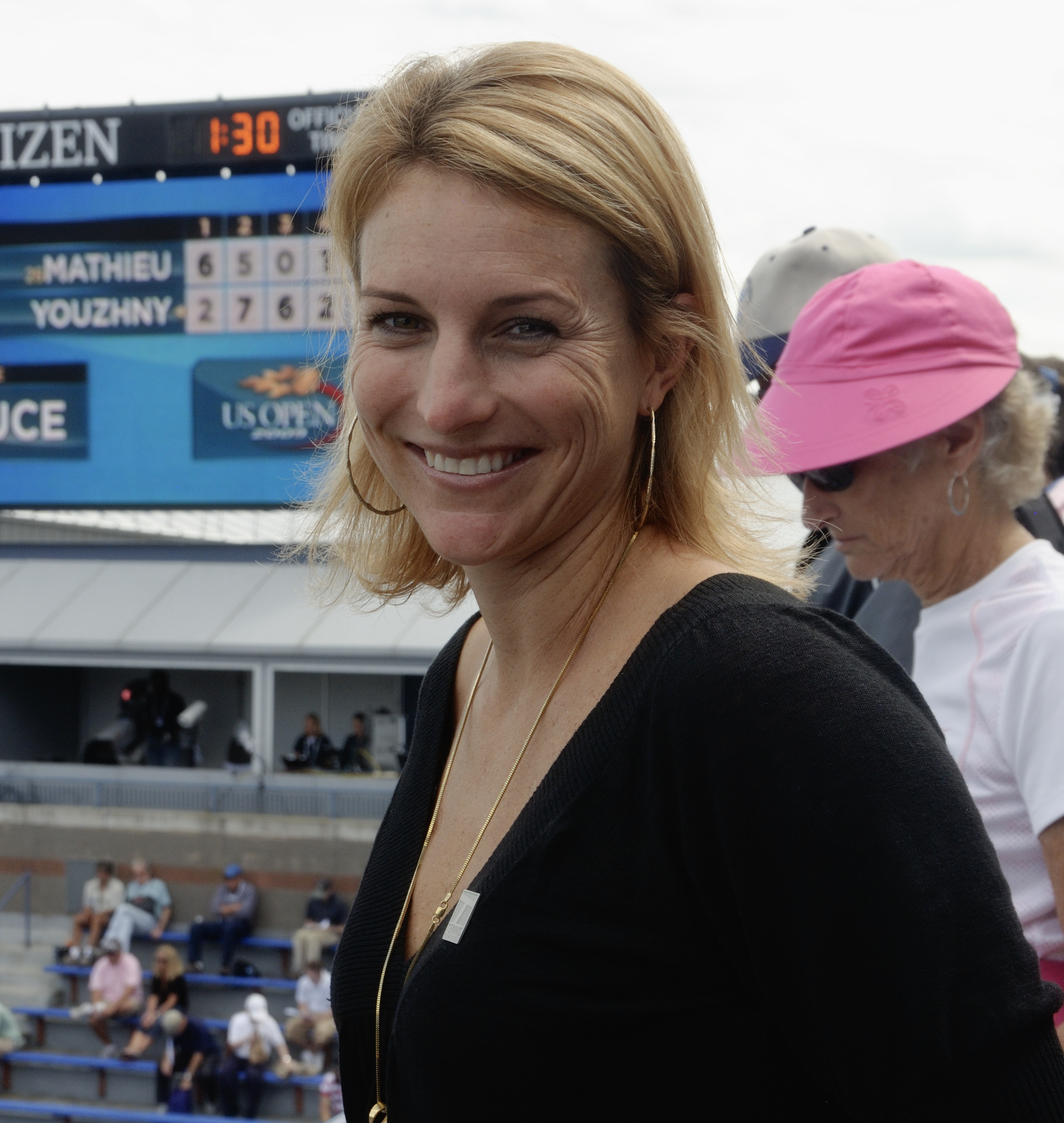
Corina Morariu

== Deaths ==
- April 24 - Heartley "Hunk" Anderson, native of Calumet, Michigan, American football player and coach (1918-1945), and College Football Hall of Fame inductee, at age 79 in West Palm Beach, Florida
- August 5 - Dutch Clark, American football player and coach (1926-1953), 6× first-team All-Pro, led Detroit Lions to 1935 NFL championship, and Pro Football Hall of Fame inductee, at age 71 in Cañon City, Colorado
- August 28 - Bruce Catton, historian known for his books about the Civil War, at age 78 in Frankfort, Michigan
- November 23 - George Wilson, NFL player and coach (1937-1969) and Detroit Lions head coach (1957-1964), at age 64 in Detroit

=== Gallery of 1978 deaths ===
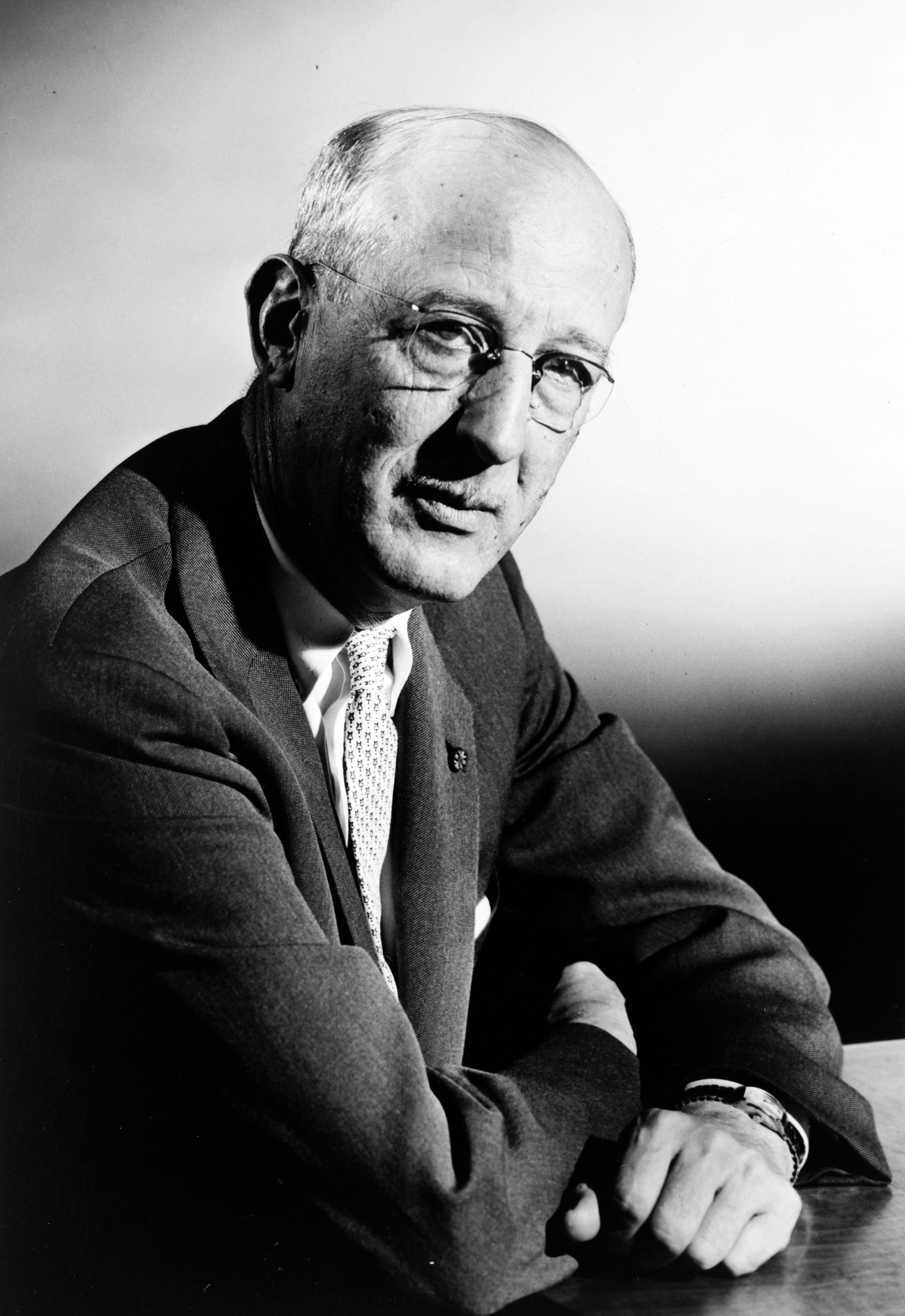
Bruce Catton
