= Lyman Parks =

American politician

Rev. Lyman S. Parks
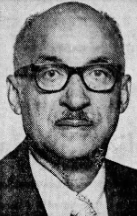

Mayor of Grand Rapids, Michigan
- In office 1971–1976
- Preceded by: Robert Boelens
- Succeeded by: Abe L. Drasin

Personal details
- Born: 1917
- Died: November 4, 2009 Lisle, Illinois, United States

Rev. Lyman S. Parks (1917 – November 4, 2009) was the mayor of Grand Rapids, Michigan from 1971 to 1976. He was the first African-American to serve in the position. He was also the first African-American elected to the Grand Rapids City Commission in 1968. Recognizing his contributions to the city of Grand Rapids, a statue in his honor was dedicated in 2013 in front of the Grand Rapids City Hall.

== Early life and education ==
Parks grew up in southern Indiana at Lyles Station. He graduated in 1944 from Wilberforce University and Payne Theological Seminary.

== Pastoral career ==
He served as pastor to congregations in Marion, Indiana; Richmond, Indiana; Ann Arbor, Michigan; and River Rouge, Michigan. He moved to Grand Rapids in 1966, where he took a position as pastor of First Community AME Church. During his tenure at First Community A.M.E. he grew the church membership and mentored many who continued on into future ministry roles. Supportive of families, Rev. Parks encouraged parents to bring their children to church and participate in the many activities of the church. His sermons were both informative and effective in inspiring people to be involved in the life of their communities. After retiring from First Community A.M.E Church, he was asked to return as pastor of Greater Institutional AME Church in Chicago where he concluded his pastoral career.

== Political career ==
In 1968 he ran for City Commission representing the city's Third ward, and was elected. In June 1971, he was selected by his fellow commissioners to fill the vacancy left by the resignation of mayor Robert Boelens. In 1973, he ran for the office. Grand Rapids mayoral elections are non-partisan, but Republican U.S. Representative Gerald R. Ford (who would shortly be appointed Vice President and then become President) encouraged businessman and Republican activist Peter Secchia to support Parks' campaign. Parks was elected, defeating 10 other candidates. With his election, Parks became the first African-American mayor of Grand Rapids. Parks' granddaughter Lauri credits him with quietly persuading Amway founders Rich DeVos and Jay Van Andel to purchase and renovate the Pantlind Hotel, the first of many investments to revitalize downtown Grand Rapids.

Parks lost his bid for re-election in 1976, to Abe Drasin, and returned to full-time ministry. Governor William Milliken appointed him to the State Officers Compensation Commission in 1982. He retired from First Community in 1985. He moved to Chicago, where he resumed ministry at Greater Institutional AME Church. He moved back to Grand Rapids in 1999, but lived the last year of his life in Lisle, Illinois. He died on November 4, 2009, following a stroke a few days earlier.

== See also ==
- List of first African-American mayors

Political offices
Preceded by Robert Boelens	Mayor of Grand Rapids, Michigan; 1971 - 1976	Succeeded by Abe L. Drasin
