= Ann Arbor Hospital murders =

Murders of patients by Pavulon in Michigan

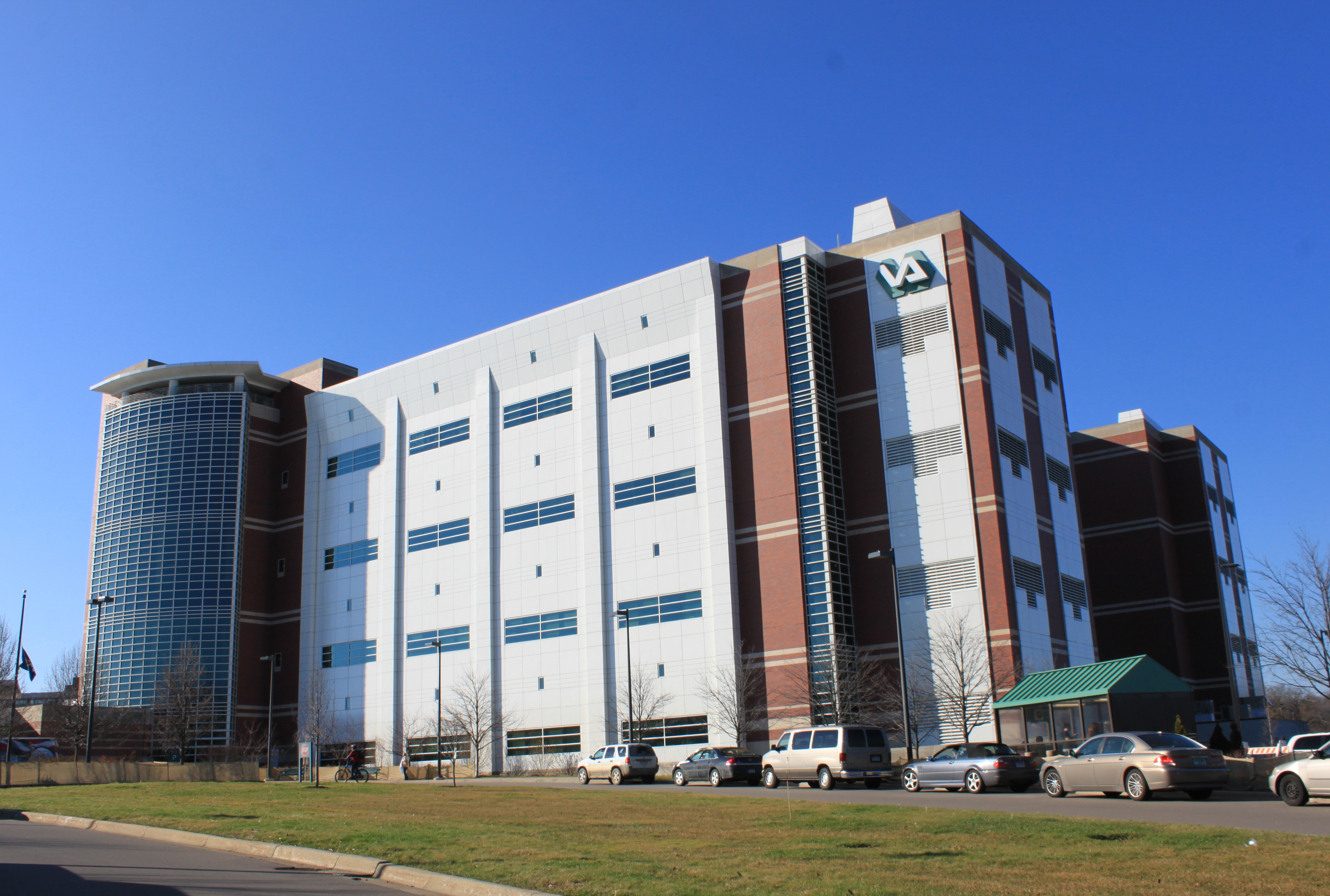
The Ann Arbor VA Medical Center, the site of the murders, photographed in 2012

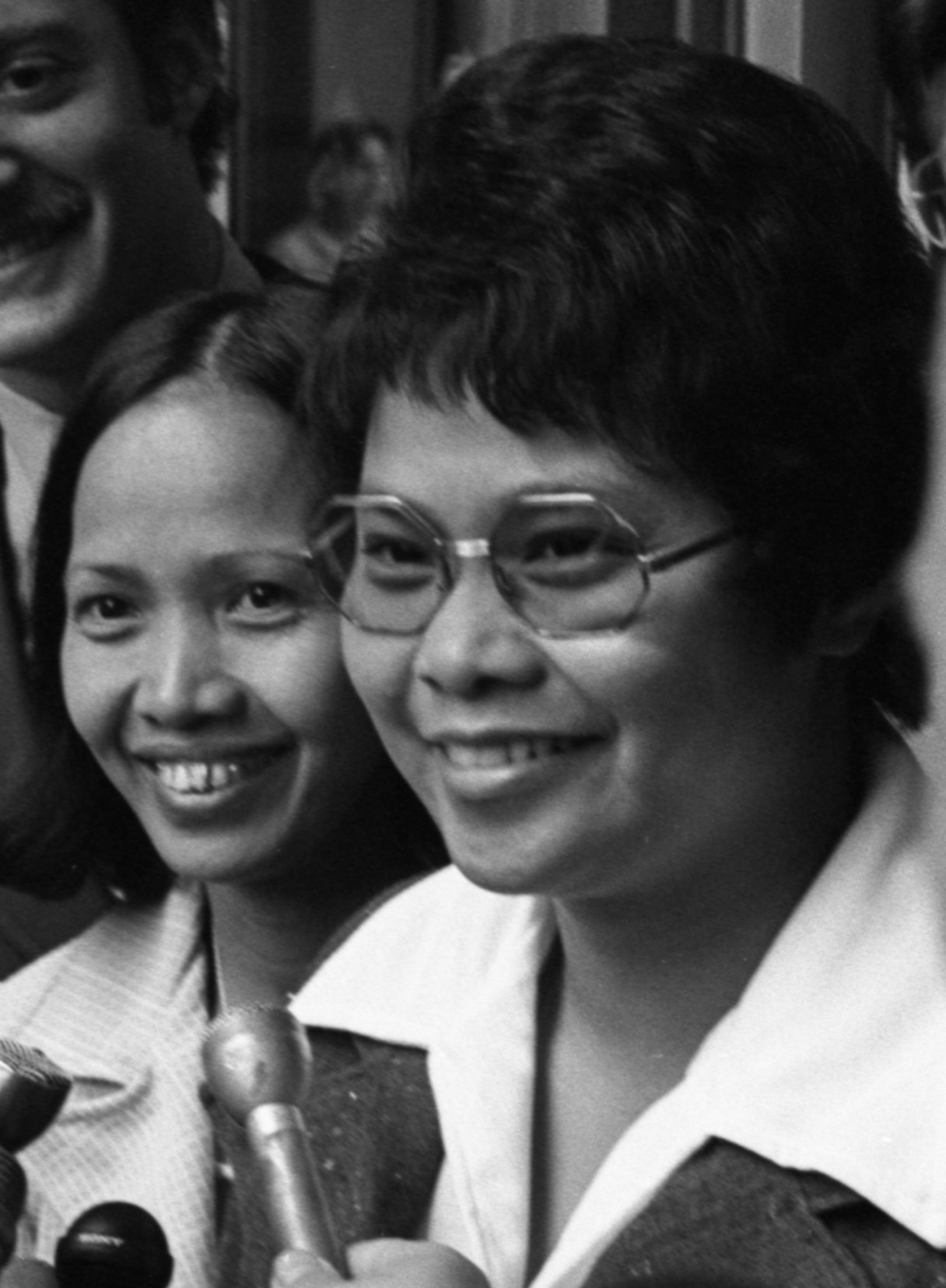
Leonora Perez (left) and Filipina Narciso (right), the two nurses charged in the case

The Ann Arbor Hospital murders were the murders of 10 patients by unauthorized administration in their IV of the curare drug Pavulon in an Ann Arbor, Michigan, VA hospital in 1975. After a vast FBI investigation into the deaths, the nurses Filipina Narciso and Leonora Perez were charged with murder but convicted only for the charges of poisoning and conspiracy. Public opinion was against prosecution of the nurses on the basis that they could have had only the most trivial of possible motives for conspiring to commit such extremely serious crimes, and the case was dropped after a retrial had been ordered.

== Homicides and investigation ==
During a few months in 1975, patients at the VA hospital in Ann Arbor, Michigan, began suffering respiratory failure and sometimes died with extraordinary frequency. In a single 20-minute period on a day in mid-August, three patients required emergency treatment to save their lives, and the chief of anesthesiology found that the patients responded to an antidote for a paralyzing drug and so called in the FBI. The case series was written up in the New England Journal (Strosser, 1975). Investigators found that the nurse Filipina Narciso had been on duty in the relevant ward during every poisoning, and she was identified by a patient as the nurse who had injected something into his IV just before his breathing suddenly stopped.

The nurse Leonora Perez was also identified by another patient as having injected his IV just before his respiratory arrest occurred, but like the patient who had identified Narciso, he died before the trial. The case against Narciso and Perez was considered by Assistant U.S. Attorney General Richard Delonis to be "highly circumstantial", but the defense lawyers felt that it was strong enough that they had to put their clients on the stand, where they appeared evasive. There was only one charge of murder considered by the jury, and the other charges were of poisoning.

Both defendants were recent immigrants to the United States, and the trial was marred by accusations of racism. One man, originally slated to be the lead witness for the prosecution, referred to Perez and Narciso as "slant-eyed bitches" and asserted that there was a nationwide conspiracy of Filipino nurses to murder veterans. Also, racial tensions ran high because of the country's large rates of immigration from Asia.

The two defendants were the primary but not always the only nurses on duty during the poisonings. The prosecution emphasized the regular proximity of the defendants to poisoned patients. Crucial evidence came from a relative of the victims, who testified that one of the defendants had been in the room and doing something to the bedside equipment just before he suddenly stopped breathing. The significance of the evidence that the defendants had been in the room shortly before was that the injections of Pavulon, according to the prosecution's experts, must have been administered only minutes before the victims had suffered paralysis and stopped breathing. Narciso and Perez were acquitted of the murder charge, but both nurses were found guilty of three counts of poisoning and conspiracy to poison patients.

== Verdicts and appeal ==
Pacifico Marcos, the president of the Philippine Medical Association and the younger brother of Philippine President Ferdinand Marcos, headed a defense fund and called the verdict a "miscarriage of justice". In February of the following year, a judge set aside the guilty verdicts by ruling that the jury, which had deliberated for 15 days and acquitted on the only remaining murder charge and some of the poisoning charges, may have been influenced by what amounted to prejudicial presentation of the prosecution case during the trial.

The new attorney general declined to mount another prosecution, reportedly because the American public was not behind the prosecution of the nurses, and the defendants were unlikely to make the mistake of exposing themselves to cross-examination again. Narciso and Perez had suffered as a result of their lengthy trial process. The prosecution of Narciso and Perez for the murders became a focal point for many protest groups and Filipinos, who united in their condemnation of the handling of the case and expressed support for both nurses.

== In popular culture ==
In 1976, Filipino actor Joseph Estrada (later president of the Philippines) starred in and produced the Filipino film Dateline Chicago: Arrest the Nurse Killer! which depicted the murder accusations against Filipina Narciso and Leonora Perez.

== See also ==
- Toronto hospital baby deaths - another case in which nurses were accused of motiveless homicides.

General:

- List of homicides in Michigan
- List of fugitives from justice who disappeared
- List of serial killers in the United States
