= Thomas G. Kavanagh =

American judge

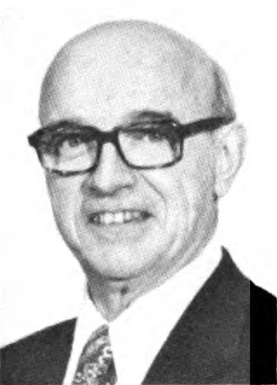
Thomas G. Kavanagh c. 1977

Thomas Giles Kavanagh (August 14, 1917 – February 20, 1997) was an American jurist.

Born in Bay City, Michigan, Kavanagh graduated from the University of Detroit High School. He then received his bachelor's degree from University of Notre Dame in 1938 and his law degree from University of Detroit Mercy School of Law in 1943. In 1964, Kavanagh was elected to the Michigan Court of Appeals. From 1969 until 1985, Kavanagh served on the Michigan Supreme Court and was chief justice from 1975 to 1979. Kavanagh was a Democrat. He died in Royal Oak, Michigan of lung cancer.
