= 1986 in Michigan =

- Decades: 1960s; 1970s; 1980s; 1990s; 2000s
- See also: History of Michigan; Historical outline of Michigan; List of years in Michigan; 1986 in the United States

Events from the year 1986 in Michigan.

== Top Michigan news stories ==
The Associated Press (AP) selected the top stories in Michigan for 1986 as follows:

1. Heavy rains in September and October that brought 20 inches of rainfall and resulted in $400 million in damage, including $289 million in losses to farmers. Gov. Blanchard declared the flooding to be the worst in state history.
2. The November gubernatorial election in which James Blanchard won re-election with 68% of the vote. Republican William Lucas, the first African-American candidate for the office, received 31% of the vote. The margin was the largest landslide in Michigan in six decades.
3. Incentives offered by General Motors and other American automobile manufacturers to reduce inventory. GM offered 2.9% financing, and American Motors offered zero percent loans on some models.
4. Record high water levels in the Great Lakes. Lake levels in October 1986 were more than a foot higher than the previous year.
5. The proposed conversion of Consumers Power's Midland Nuclear Power Plant to gas generation.
6. General Motors' announcement, following a $338 million operating loss in the third quarter, that it would close nine plants and scale back operations at two other plants. Seven of the affected plants were located in Michigan. The move was expected to result in the loss of 17,000 jobs in Michigan.
7. The decline in gasoline prices to 83 cents a gallon in Michigan.
8. The arraignment of Judge S. Jerome Bronson for bribery and his suicide hours later.
9. The application to the Department of Justice for a joint operating agreement between the state's two largest newspapers, The Detroit News and Detroit Free Press.
10. Michigan's unemployment rate drops below 10%.

The AP also separately suggested the state's top sports stories as follows:

1. The story of Chuck Long being drafted by the Detroit Lions, holding out for better contract terms, and missing most of the 1986 Detroit Lions season.
2. Kirk Gibson re-signing with the Detroit Tigers after becoming a free agent.
3. The Michigan Wolverines defeated Nebraska in the 1986 Fiesta Bowl, led by Jamie Morris who rushed for 156 yards in the game, and were ranked No. 2 in the final AP Poll.
4. The Detroit Red Wings' firing of Brad Park as head coach and hiring of Jacques Demers to replace him.
5. (tie) Jim Harbaugh guaranteeing a victory over Ohio State and leading the 1986 Michigan Wolverines football team to a berth in the Rose Bowl.
5. (tie) The demise of the Cherry Bowl, a bowl game played in the Pontiac Silverdome in 1984 and 1985.
7. The end of Scott Skiles' college basketball career. He led the 1985–86 Michigan State Spartans men's basketball team to the Sweet Sixteen round in the 1986 NCAA Division I men's basketball tournament.
8. The Michigan State Spartans men's ice hockey team winning the 1986 NCAA Division I Men's Ice Hockey Tournament.
9. (tie) The deaths of Detroit sports legends, Hank Greenberg (September 4), Norm Cash (October 11), and Bobby Layne (December 1).
10. The Detroit Pistons' trades that saw the departures of Kelly Tripucka and John Long and arrivals of Adrian Dantley and Sidney Green.

== Office holders ==
=== State office holders ===
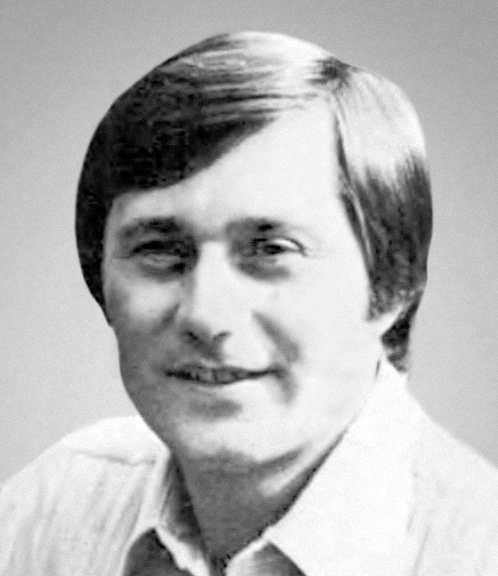
Gov. Blanchard

- Governor of Michigan: James Blanchard (Democrat)
- Lieutenant Governor of Michigan: Martha Griffiths (Democrat)
- Michigan Attorney General: Frank J. Kelley (Democrat)
- Michigan Secretary of State: Richard H. Austin (Democrat)
- Speaker of the Michigan House of Representatives: Gary Owen (Democrat)
- Majority Leader of the Michigan Senate: John Engler (Republican)
- Chief Justice, Michigan Supreme Court: G. Mennen Williams

=== Mayors of major cities ===
- Mayor of Detroit: Coleman Young
- Mayor of Grand Rapids: Gerald R. Helmholdt
- Mayor of Warren, Michigan: Ronald L. Bonkowski
- Mayor of Sterling Heights, Michigan: Jean DiRezze Gush
- Mayor of Flint: James A. Sharp, Jr.
- Mayor of Dearborn: John O'Reilly, Sr./Michael Guido
- Mayor of Lansing: Terry John McKane
- Mayor of Ann Arbor: Edward C. Pierce (Democrat)
- Mayor of Saginaw: Lawrence D. Crawford

=== Federal office holders ===
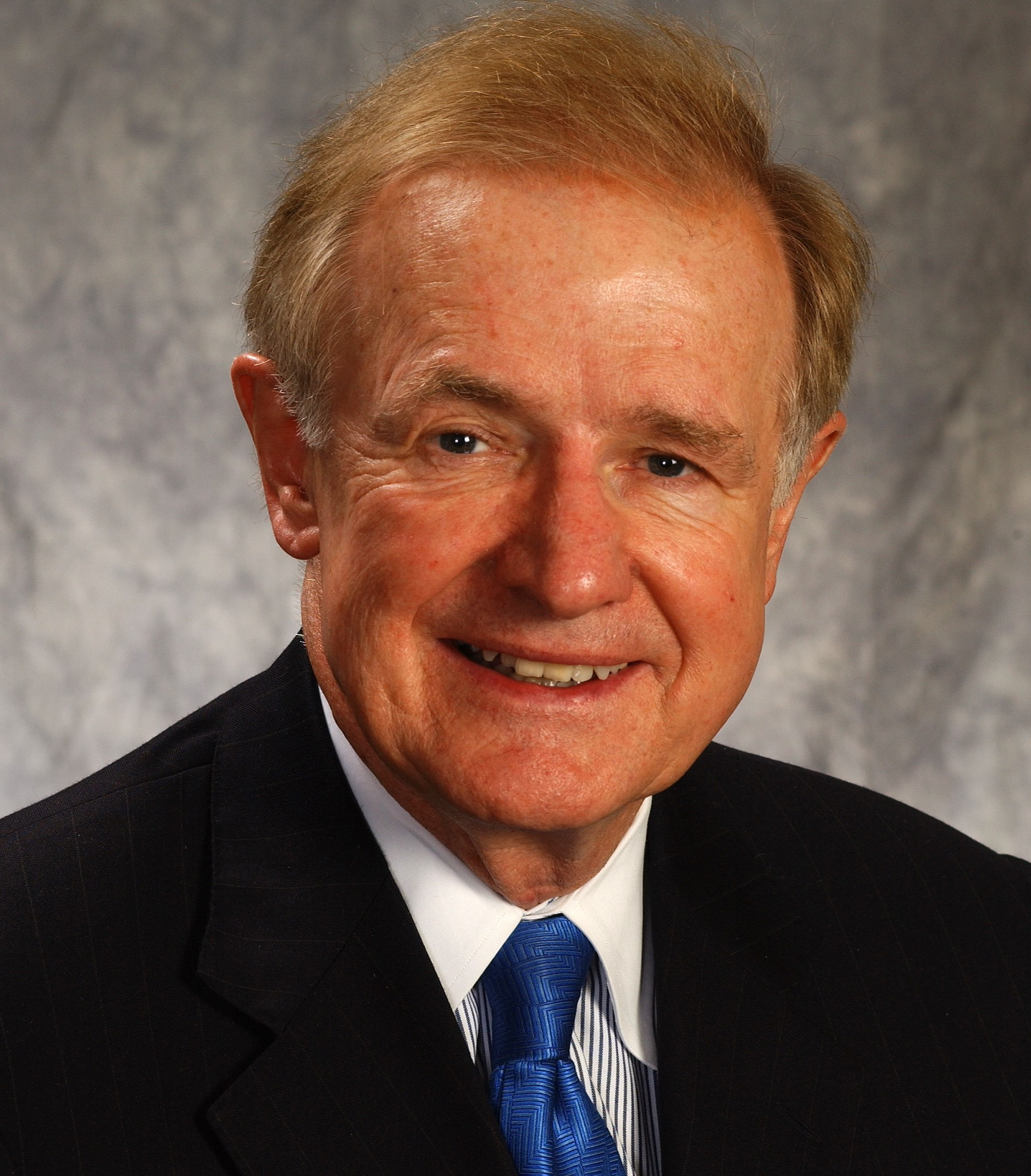
Sen. Riegle

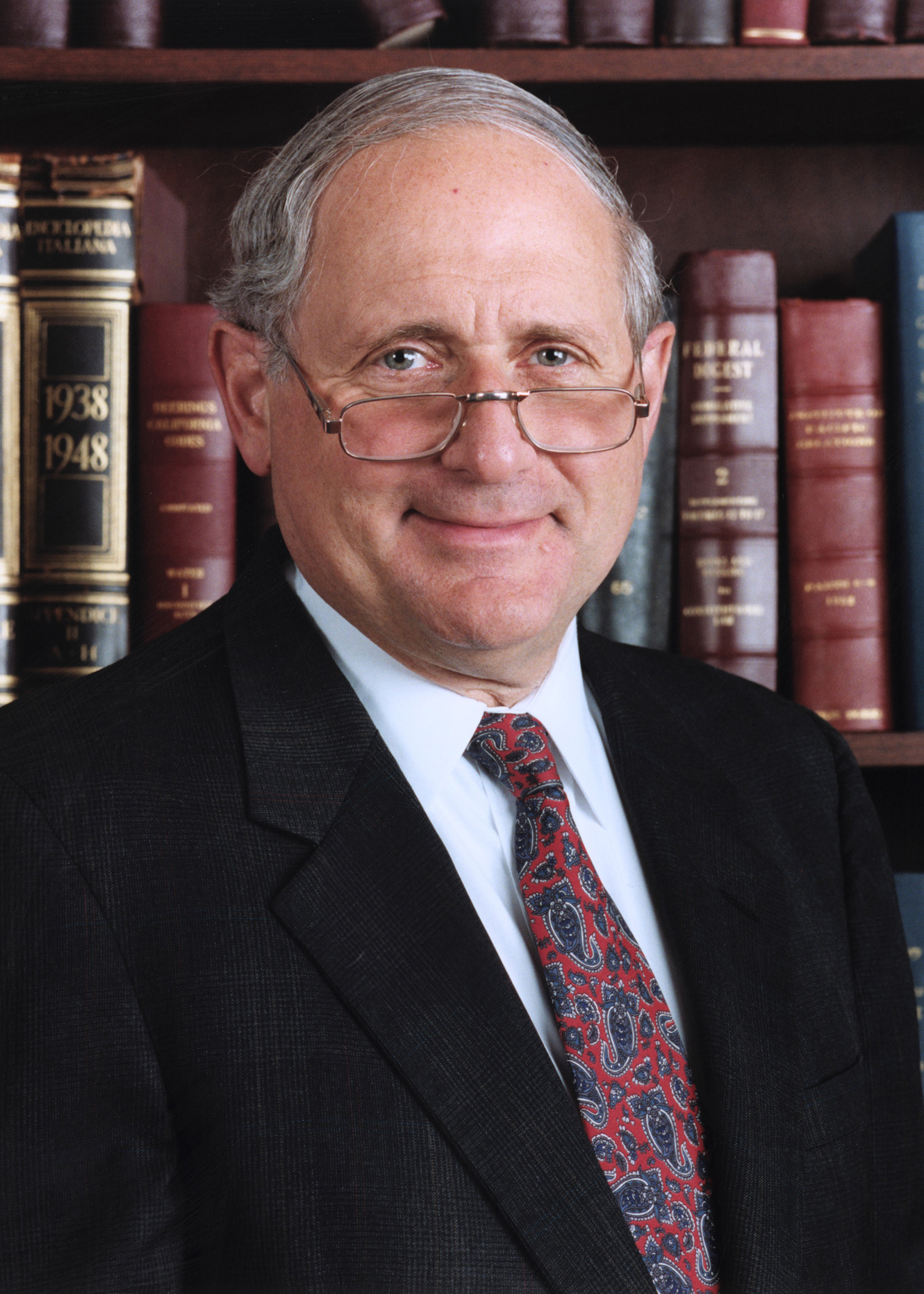
Sen. Levin

- U.S. Senator from Michigan: Donald W. Riegle Jr. (Democrat)
- U.S. Senator from Michigan: Carl Levin (Democrat)
- House District 1: John Conyers (Democrat)
- House District 2: Carl Pursell (Republican)
- House District 3: Howard Wolpe (Republican)
- House District 4: Mark D. Siljander (Republican)
- House District 5: Harold S. Sawyer (Republican)
- House District 6: Bob Carr (Democrat)
- House District 7: Dale Kildee (Democrat)
- House District 8: J. Bob Traxler (Democrat)
- House District 9: Guy Vander Jagt (Republican)
- House District 10: Bill Schuette (Republican)
- House District 11: Robert William Davis (Republican)
- House District 12: David Bonior (Democrat)
- House District 13: George Crockett Jr. (Democrat)
- House District 14: Dennis M. Hertel (Democrat)
- House District 15: William D. Ford (Democrat)
- House District 16: John Dingell (Democrat)
- House District 17: Sander Levin (Democrat)
- House District 18: William Broomfield (Republican)

== Population ==
In the 1980 United States census, Michigan was recorded as having a population of 9,259,000 persons, ranking as the eighth most populous state in the country. By 1990, the state's population had grown only marginally by 0.4% to 9,259,000 persons.

=== Cities ===
The following is a list of cities in Michigan with a population of at least 50,000 based on 1980 U.S. Census data. Historic census data from 1970 and 1990 is included to reflect trends in population increases or decreases. Cities that are part of the Detroit metropolitan area are shaded in tan.

1980 Rank	City	County	1970 Pop.	1980 Pop.	1990 Pop.	Change 1980-90
1	Detroit	Wayne	1,514,063	1,203,368	1,027,974	−14.6% ▼
2	Grand Rapids	Kent	197,649	181,843	189,126	4.0% ▲
3	Warren	Macomb	179,260	161,134	144,864	−10.1% ▼
4	Flint	Genesee	193,317	159,611	140,761	−11.8% ▼
5	Lansing	Ingham	131,403	130,414	127,321	−2.4% ▼
6	Sterling Heights	Macomb	61,365	108,999	117,810	8.1% ▲
7	Ann Arbor	Washtenaw	100,035	107,969	109,592	1.5% ▲
8	Livonia	Wayne	110,109	104,814	100,850	−3.8% ▼
9	Dearborn	Wayne	104,199	90,660	89,286	−1.5%▼
10	Westland	Wayne	86,749	84,603	84,724	0.1% ▲
11	Kalamazoo	Kalamazoo	85,555	79,722	80,277	0.7% ▲
12	Taylor	Wayne	70,020	77,568	70,811	−8.7% ▼
13	Saginaw	Saginaw	91,849	77,508	69,512	−10.3% ▼
14	Pontiac	Oakland	85,279	76,715	71,166	−7.2% ▼
15	St. Clair Shores	Macomb	88,093	76,210	68,107	−10.6% ▼
16	Southfield	Oakland	69,298	75,608	75,745	0.2% ▲
17	Royal Oak	Oakland	86,238	70,893	65,410	−7.7% ▼
18	Dearborn Heights	Wayne	80,069	67,706	60,838	−10.1% ▼
19	Troy	Oakland	39,419	67,102	72,884	8.6% ▲
20	Wyoming	Kent	56,560	59,616	63,891	7.2% ▲
21	Farmington Hills	Oakland	--	58,056	74,611	28.5% ▲
22	Roseville	Macomb	60,529	54,311	51,412	−5.3% ▼
23	East Lansing	Ingham	47,540	51,392	50,677	−1.4% ▼

=== Counties ===
The following is a list of counties in Michigan with populations of at least 100,000 based on 1980 U.S. Census data. Historic census data from 1970 and 1990 are included to reflect trends in population increases or decreases. Counties that are part of the Detroit metropolitan area are shaded in tan.

1980 Rank	County	Largest city	1970 Pop.	1980 Pop.	1990 Pop.	Change 1980-90
1	Wayne	Detroit	2,666,751	2,337,891	2,111,687	−9.7% ▼
2	Oakland	Pontiac	907,871	1,011,793	1,083,592	7.1% ▲
3	Macomb	Warren	625,309	694,600	717,400	3.3% ▲
4	Genesee	Flint	444,341	450,449	430,459	−4.4% ▼
5	Kent	Grand Rapids	411,044	444,506	500,631	12.6% ▲
6	Ingham	Lansing	261,039	275,520	281,912	2.3% ▲
7	Washtenaw	Ann Arbor	234,103	264,748	282,937	6.9% ▲
8	Saginaw	Saginaw	219,743	228,059	211,946	−7.1% ▼
9	Kalamazoo	Kalamazoo	201,550	212,378	223,411	5.2% ▲
10	Berrien	Benton Harbor	163,875	171,276	161,378	−5.8% ▼
11	Muskegon	Muskegon	157,426	157,589	158,983	0.9% ▲
12	Ottawa	Holland	128,181	157,174	187,768	19.5% ▲
13	Jackson	Jackson	143,274	151,495	149,756	−1.1% ▼
14	Calhoun	Battle Creek	141,963	141,557	135,982	−3.9% ▼
15	St. Clair	Port Huron	120,175	138,802	145,607	4.9% ▲
16	Monroe	Monroe	118,479	134,659	133,600	−0.8% ▼
17	Bay	Bay City	117,339	119,881	111,723	−6.8% ▼
18	Livingston	Howell	58,967	100,289	115,645	15.3% ▲

== Sports ==
=== Baseball ===
- 1986 Detroit Tigers season – Under manager Sparky Anderson, the Tigers compiled an 87-75 record and finished third in American League East. The team's statistical leaders included Alan Trammell with a .277 batting average, Darrell Evans with 29 home runs, Kirk Gibson with 86 RBIs, Jack Morris with 21 wins, and Mark Thurmond with a 1.92 earned run average.

=== American football ===
- 1986 Detroit Lions season – Under head coach Darryl Rogers, the Lions compiled a 5-11 record and finished third in the NFC Central Division. The team's statistical leaders included Eric Hipple with 1,919 passing yards, James Jones with 903 rushing yards, Jeff Chadwick with 995 receiving yards, and Eddie Murray with 85 points scored.
- 1986 Michigan Wolverines football team – Under head coach Bo Schembechler, the Wolverines compiled an 11–2 record and a berth in the 1987 Rose Bowl. The team's statistical leaders included Jim Harbaugh with 2,729 passing yards, Jamie Morris with 1,086 rushing yards, Ken Higgins with 621 receiving yards, and Mike Gillette with 59 points scored.

=== Basketball ===
- 1985–86 Detroit Pistons season – Under head coach Chuck Daly, the Pistons compiled a 46-36 record and finished third in the NBA's Central Division. The team's statistical leaders included Kelly Tripucka with 1,622 points, Isaiah Thomas with 830 assists and Bill Laimbeer with 1,075 rebounds.

=== Ice hockey ===
- 1985–86 Detroit Red Wings season – Under head coaches Harry Neale and Brad Park, the Red Wings compiled a 17-57-6 record and finished fifth in the NHL Norris Division. The team's statistical leaders included John Ogrodnick with 38 goals and 70 points and Kelly Kisio with 48 assists. The team's goaltenders were Greg Stefan (37 games), Mark LaForest (28 games), Eddie Mio (18 games), and Corrado Micalef (11 games).

== Music and culture ==
- March 1986 - Anita Baker's album Rapture was released, sold 8 million copies, and won two Grammy Awards for Baker. The single "Sweet Love" reached No. 8 on the Billboard Hot 100.
- March 1986 - Ted Nugent's album Little Miss Dangerous was released.
- April 1986 - Bob Seger's album Like a Rock was released and reached No. 3 on the album chart. The single "Like a Rock" reached No. 1 on the US Billboard Mainstream Rock Tracks.
- June 1985 - Madonna's album True Blue was released and reached No. 1 on the album chart. The album included five hit singles, "Papa Don't Preach" (No. 1), "Open Your Heart" (No. 1), "Live to Tell" (No. 1), "True Blue" (No. 3), and "La Isla Bonita" (No. 4).
- September 1986 - Alice Cooper's album Constrictor was released.
- October 1986 - Iggy Pop's album Blah-Blah-Blah was released.

== Deaths ==
- June 12 - Murray Van Wagoner, 38th Governor of Michigan (1941-1943), at age 88 in Farmington Hills
- June 26 - Sanford A. Brown, Michigan State Treasurer (1955–1965), at age 77 in Bay Port

== See also ==
- History of Michigan
- History of Detroit
