= 1985 in Michigan =

- Decades: 1960s; 1970s; 1980s; 1990s; 2000s
- See also: History of Michigan; Historical outline of Michigan; List of years in Michigan; 1985 in the United States

Events from the year 1985 in Michigan.

== Top Michigan news stories ==
The Associated Press (AP) selected the state's top news stories as follows:

1. The enactment of a state law, effective July 1, 1985, requiring all drivers of motor vehicles and front-seat passengers to wear seat belts. Opponents viewed the law as excessive government intrusion.
2. National competition for construction of a high tech, $3.5 billion plant to build automobiles for General Motors' new Saturn division. In August, GM announced that the plant would be built in Spring Hill, Tennessee.
3. The state government's return to financial solvency. Gov. James Blanchard declared "Solvency Day" on November 8 when the state repaid its $1.8 billion debt.
4. The rapid increase in premiums for liability insurance for doctors, truckers, lawyers, tavern keepers, and others.
5. A late summer sales boom for automobiles, following a Teamsters strike that limited supplies to automobile pants and further fueled by a price war in late August and September that included rebates and low interest rates on car loans.
6. An ice storm that struck the state on New Year's Day and cut off electricity to 370,000 customers.
7. The arrest of 26-year-old Ronald Bailey of Livonia for the abduction and murder of two young boys, ages 13 and 14, and the kidnapping and sexual assault of another youth.
8. A late summer storm that resulted in record flooding in Flint, causing $10 million in damages.
9. A decline in the state's unemployment rate to 9.3% in March, the first time in five years that the rate had dropped below 10%.
10. The Michigan State Police's seizure of three children living in a dilapidated bus near Niles, Michigan. The parents, Donald and Eva Monk, were tried and acquitted of child cruelty and subsequently filed a lawsuit against the state over the removal of their children.

The AP also selected the state's top sports stories as follows:

1. After finishing with a 6–6 record in 1984, the 1985 Michigan Wolverines football team led by quarterback Jim Harbaugh finished the season with a 10–1–1 record, defeated Nebraska in the Fiesta Bowl, and was ranked No. 2 in the AP Poll.
2. The hiring of Darryl Rogers as head coach of the Detroit Lions, following the firing of Monte Clark.
3. Michigan State sophomore running back Lorenzo White led the NCAA with 1,908 rushing yards and finished third in voting for the Heisman Trophy.
4. The 1984–85 Michigan Wolverines men's basketball team led by Roy Tarpley and Antoine Joubert compiled a 26–4 record, won the Big Ten championship, and were ranked No. 2 in the AP and coaches' polls released at the end of the regular season.
5. The 1985 Detroit Tigers season in which the team finished third in the American League East, 15 games behind the Toronto Blue Jays.
6. Kirk Gibson's declaration of free agency after the 1985 season and contract negotiations between Gibson and the Tigers.
7. The U.S. Open golf championship at Oakland Hills Country Club, ending with Andy North as champion after a final-round collapse by T.C. Chen.
8. Darrell Evans, at age 38, leading the American League with 40 home runs.
9. The Detroit Red Wings' signing of Czechoslovak hockey star, Petr Klíma.
10. Marvin Hagler vs. Thomas Hearns - The April 15 boxing match in Las Vegas between the "Motor City Cobra" Thomas Hearns and Marvelous Marvin Hagler, ending in a technical knockout of Hearns in the third round.

== Office holders ==
=== State office holders ===
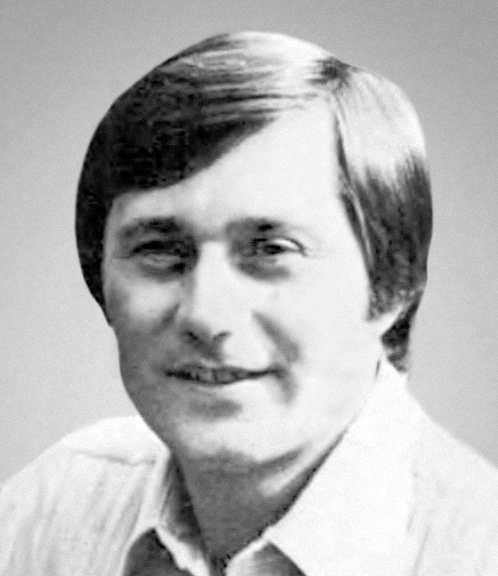
Gov. Blanchard

- Governor of Michigan: James Blanchard (Democrat)
- Lieutenant Governor of Michigan: Martha Griffiths (Democrat)
- Michigan Attorney General: Frank J. Kelley (Democrat)
- Michigan Secretary of State: Richard H. Austin (Democrat)
- Speaker of the Michigan House of Representatives: Gary Owen (Democrat)
- Majority Leader of the Michigan Senate: John Engler (Republican)
- Chief Justice, Michigan Supreme Court: G. Mennen Williams

=== Mayors of major cities ===
- Mayor of Detroit: Coleman Young
- Mayor of Grand Rapids: Gerald R. Helmholdt
- Mayor of Warren, Michigan: James R. Randlett/Ronald L. Bonkowski
- Mayor of Sterling Heights, Michigan: Arthur Madar
- Mayor of Flint: James A. Sharp, Jr.
- Mayor of Dearborn: John O'Reilly, Sr.
- Mayor of Lansing: Terry John McKane
- Mayor of Ann Arbor: Louis Belcher (Republican)
- Mayor of Saginaw: Lawrence D. Crawford

=== Federal office holders ===
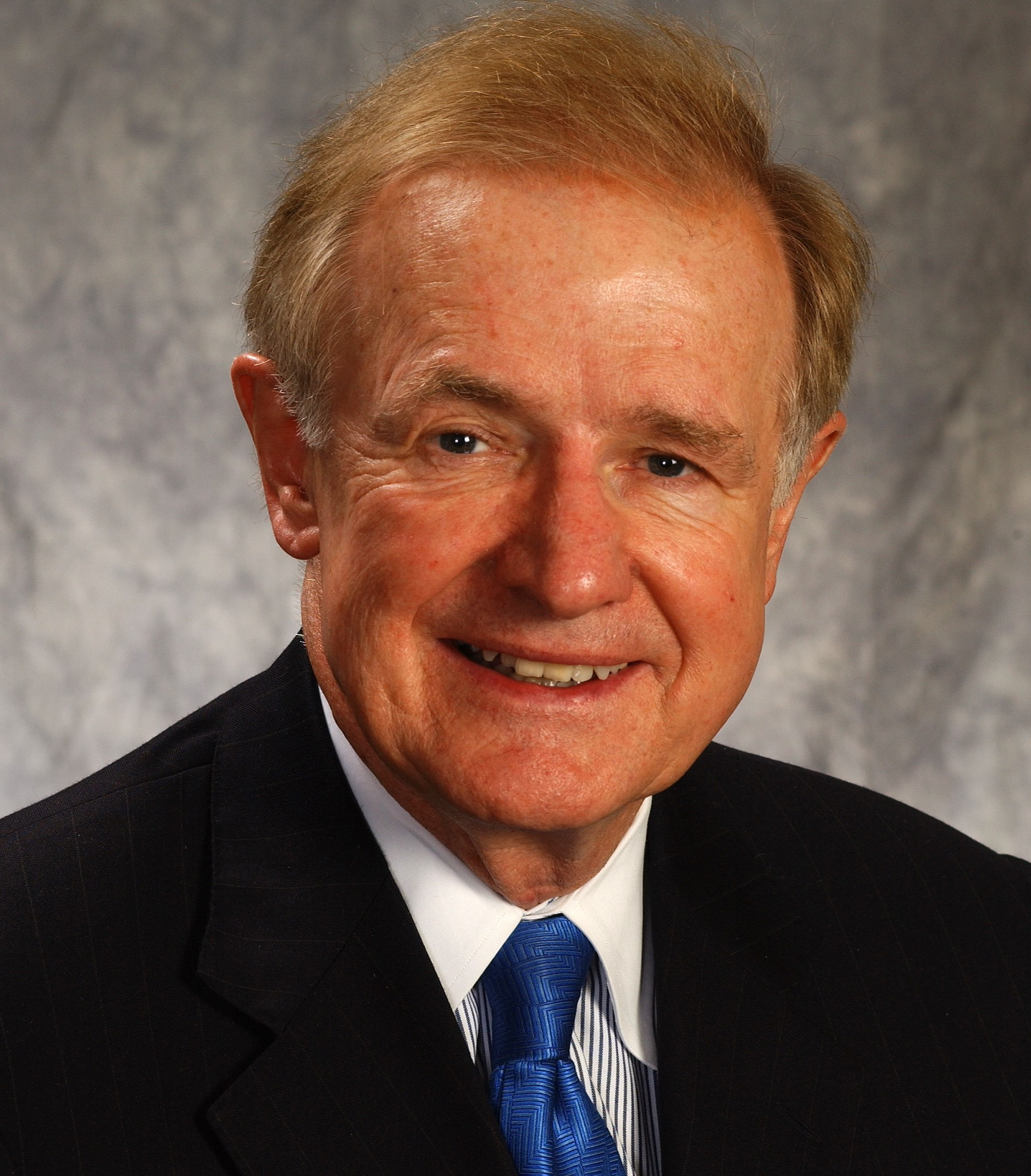
Sen. Riegle

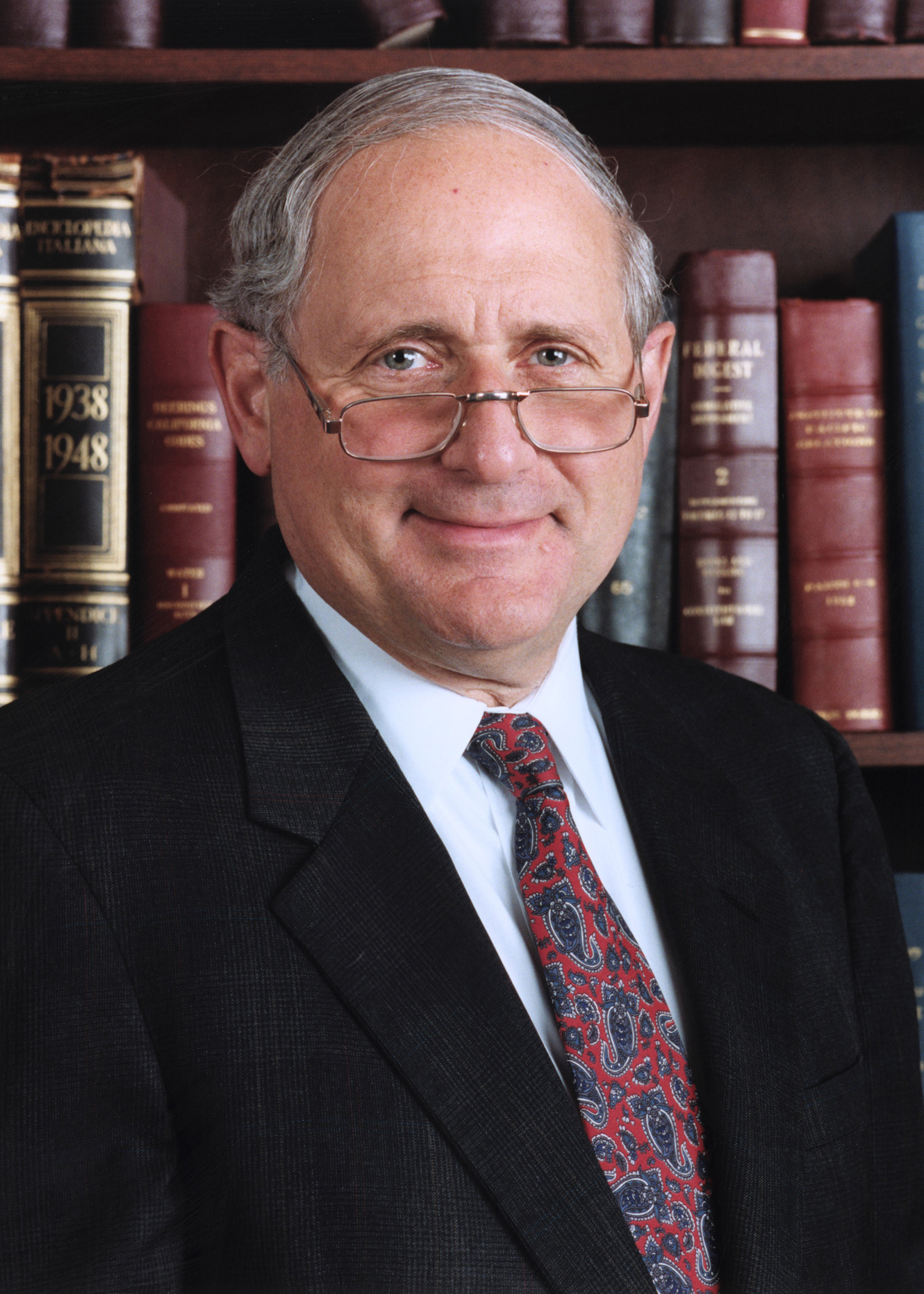
Sen. Levin

- U.S. Senator from Michigan: Donald W. Riegle Jr. (Democrat)
- U.S. Senator from Michigan: Carl Levin (Democrat)
- House District 1: John Conyers (Democrat)
- House District 2: Carl Pursell (Republican)
- House District 3: Howard Wolpe (Republican)
- House District 4: Mark D. Siljander (Republican)
- House District 5: Harold S. Sawyer (Republican)
- House District 6: Bob Carr (Democrat)
- House District 7: Dale Kildee (Democrat)
- House District 8: J. Bob Traxler (Democrat)
- House District 9: Guy Vander Jagt (Republican)
- House District 10: Bill Schuette (Republican)
- House District 11: Robert William Davis (Republican)
- House District 12: David Bonior (Democrat)
- House District 13: George Crockett Jr. (Democrat)
- House District 14: Dennis M. Hertel (Democrat)
- House District 15: William D. Ford (Democrat)
- House District 16: John Dingell (Democrat)
- House District 17: Sander Levin (Democrat)
- House District 18: William Broomfield (Republican)

== Population ==
In the 1980 United States census, Michigan was recorded as having a population of 9,259,000 persons, ranking as the eighth most populous state in the country. By 1990, the state's population had grown only marginally by 0.4% to 9,259,000 persons.

=== Cities ===
The following is a list of cities in Michigan with a population of at least 50,000 based on 1980 U.S. Census data. Historic census data from 1970 and 1990 is included to reflect trends in population increases or decreases. Cities that are part of the Detroit metropolitan area are shaded in tan.

1980 Rank	City	County	1970 Pop.	1980 Pop.	1990 Pop.	Change 1980-90
1	Detroit	Wayne	1,514,063	1,203,368	1,027,974	−14.6% ▼
2	Grand Rapids	Kent	197,649	181,843	189,126	4.0% ▲
3	Warren	Macomb	179,260	161,134	144,864	−10.1% ▼
4	Flint	Genesee	193,317	159,611	140,761	−11.8% ▼
5	Lansing	Ingham	131,403	130,414	127,321	−2.4% ▼
6	Sterling Heights	Macomb	61,365	108,999	117,810	8.1% ▲
7	Ann Arbor	Washtenaw	100,035	107,969	109,592	1.5% ▲
8	Livonia	Wayne	110,109	104,814	100,850	−3.8% ▼
9	Dearborn	Wayne	104,199	90,660	89,286	−1.5%▼
10	Westland	Wayne	86,749	84,603	84,724	0.1% ▲
11	Kalamazoo	Kalamazoo	85,555	79,722	80,277	0.7% ▲
12	Taylor	Wayne	70,020	77,568	70,811	−8.7% ▼
13	Saginaw	Saginaw	91,849	77,508	69,512	−10.3% ▼
14	Pontiac	Oakland	85,279	76,715	71,166	−7.2% ▼
15	St. Clair Shores	Macomb	88,093	76,210	68,107	−10.6% ▼
16	Southfield	Oakland	69,298	75,608	75,745	0.2% ▲
17	Royal Oak	Oakland	86,238	70,893	65,410	−7.7% ▼
18	Dearborn Heights	Wayne	80,069	67,706	60,838	−10.1% ▼
19	Troy	Oakland	39,419	67,102	72,884	8.6% ▲
20	Wyoming	Kent	56,560	59,616	63,891	7.2% ▲
21	Farmington Hills	Oakland	--	58,056	74,611	28.5% ▲
22	Roseville	Macomb	60,529	54,311	51,412	−5.3% ▼
23	East Lansing	Ingham	47,540	51,392	50,677	−1.4% ▼

=== Counties ===
The following is a list of counties in Michigan with populations of at least 100,000 based on 1980 U.S. Census data. Historic census data from 1970 and 1990 are included to reflect trends in population increases or decreases. Counties that are part of the Detroit metropolitan area are shaded in tan.

1980 Rank	County	Largest city	1970 Pop.	1980 Pop.	1990 Pop.	Change 1980-90
1	Wayne	Detroit	2,666,751	2,337,891	2,111,687	−9.7% ▼
2	Oakland	Pontiac	907,871	1,011,793	1,083,592	7.1% ▲
3	Macomb	Warren	625,309	694,600	717,400	3.3% ▲
4	Genesee	Flint	444,341	450,449	430,459	−4.4% ▼
5	Kent	Grand Rapids	411,044	444,506	500,631	12.6% ▲
6	Ingham	Lansing	261,039	275,520	281,912	2.3% ▲
7	Washtenaw	Ann Arbor	234,103	264,748	282,937	6.9% ▲
8	Saginaw	Saginaw	219,743	228,059	211,946	−7.1% ▼
9	Kalamazoo	Kalamazoo	201,550	212,378	223,411	5.2% ▲
10	Berrien	Benton Harbor	163,875	171,276	161,378	−5.8% ▼
11	Muskegon	Muskegon	157,426	157,589	158,983	0.9% ▲
12	Ottawa	Holland	128,181	157,174	187,768	19.5% ▲
13	Jackson	Jackson	143,274	151,495	149,756	−1.1% ▼
14	Calhoun	Battle Creek	141,963	141,557	135,982	−3.9% ▼
15	St. Clair	Port Huron	120,175	138,802	145,607	4.9% ▲
16	Monroe	Monroe	118,479	134,659	133,600	−0.8% ▼
17	Bay	Bay City	117,339	119,881	111,723	−6.8% ▼
18	Livingston	Howell	58,967	100,289	115,645	15.3% ▲

== Sports ==
=== Baseball ===
- 1985 Detroit Tigers season – Under manager Sparky Anderson, the Tigers compiled an 84-77 record and finished third in American League East. The team's statistical leaders included Kirk Gibson with a .287 batting average, Darrell Evans with 40 home runs, Lance Parrish with 98 RBIs, Jack Morris with 16 wins, and Willie Hernández with a 2.70 earned run average.

=== American football ===
- 1985 Detroit Lions season – Under head coach Darryl Rogers, the Lions compiled a 7-9 record and finished fourth in the NFC Central Division. The team's statistical leaders included Eric Hipple with 2,952 passing yards, James Jones with 886 rushing yards, Leonard Thompson with 736 receiving yards, and Eddie Murray with 109 points scored.
- 1985 Michigan Wolverines football team – After finishing with a 6–6 record in 1984, the 1985 Michigan Wolverines football team finished the season with a 10–1–1 record, defeated Nebraska in the Fiesta Bowl, and was ranked No. 2 in the AP Poll. The team's statistical leaders included Jim Harbaugh with 1,976 passing yards, Jamie Morris with 1,030 rushing yards, Paul Jokisch with 681 receiving yards, and Mike Gillette with 78 points scored.

=== Basketball ===
- 1984–85 Detroit Pistons season – Under head coach Chuck Daly, the Pistons compiled a 46-36 record and finished second in the NBA's Central Division. The team's statistical leaders included Isaiah Thomas with 1,720 points and 1,123 assists and Bill Laimbeer with 1,013 rebounds.

=== Ice hockey ===
- 1984–85 Detroit Red Wings season – Under head coach Nick Polano, the Red Wings compiled a 31-42-7 record and finished third in the NHL Norris Division. The team's statistical leaders included John Ogrodnick with 55 goals and 105 points and Steve Yzerman with 59 assists. The team's regular goaltenders were Greg Stefan (46 games) and Corrado Micalef (36 games).

=== Boxing ===
- April 15 - Marvin Hagler vs. Thomas Hearns

== Music and culture ==
- January 1985 - Madonna's song "Material Girl" was released as a single and reached No. 2 on the Billboard Hot 100.
- February 1985 - The film Vision Quest was released; it featured Madonna playing a singer at a local bar, where she performs the songs "Crazy for You" and "Gambler".
- March 1985 - Madonna's song "Crazy for You" was released as a single and reached No. 1 on the Billboard Hot 100.
- March 1985 - The film Desperately Seeking Susan starring Madonna in the title role was released
- April 1985 - Madonna's song "Angel" was released as a single and reached No. 5 on the Billboard Hot 100.
- July 1985 - Aretha Franklin's album Who's Zoomin' Who? was released and went platinum. The single "Freeway of Love" reached No. 3 on the Billboard Hot 100 and won the Grammy for Best Female R&B Vocal Performance.
- July 1985 - The film Silverado written and directed by University of Michigan alumnus Lawrence Kasdan was released.
- July 1985 - Madonna's song "Into the Groove" was released. Ineligible for the Billboard Hot 100, it was later honored by Billboard magazine as the Dance Single of the Decade.
- July 1985 - Madonna's song "Dress You Up" was released as a single and reached No. 5 on the Billboard Hot 100.
- September 1985 - Stevie Wonder's album In Square Circle was released and spent 12 weeks at No. 1 on the Top R&B Albums chart. The single "Part-Time Lover" reached No. 1 on the Billboard Hot 100.
- September 1985 - Diana Ross' album Eaten Alive was released and reached No. 45 on the album chart.

== Births ==
- May 9 - Jake Long
- July 2 - Chad Henne

== Deaths ==
- April 23 - Whitey Wistert
- October 3 - Charles Collingwood
- September 10 - Ebbie Goodfellow
- December 14 - Charlie Bachman

== See also ==
- History of Michigan
- History of Detroit
