= 1984 in Michigan =

- Decades: 1960s; 1970s; 1980s; 1990s; 2000s
- See also: History of Michigan; Historical outline of Michigan; List of years in Michigan; 1984 in the United States

Events from the year 1984 in Michigan.

== Top Michigan news stories ==
The Associated Press (AP) selected the state's top news stories as follows:

1. The July 16 decision by Consumers Power to shut down the Midland Nuclear Power Plant which was 85% complete, but had experienced massive cost overruns and total costs in excess of $3.6 billion;
2. (tie) The takeover of the Michigan Senate by Republicans in February 1984 following special elections to replace two Democratic Senators (Philip Mastin and David Serotkin) who had been ousted in 1983 recall elections targeting legislators who voted in favor of a 38% income tax increase;
2. (tie) The resurgence of the automobile industry, including increased sales and profits and the announcement by Mazda that it would build a $450 million plant in Flat Rock, Michigan;
4. The United Auto Workers' six-day strike against 17 General Motors plants in September;
5. (tie) The defeat of Proposition C, a ballot initiative dubbed "Voter's Choice" which would have rolled back taxes to 1981 levels, required voter approval for future tax increases, and reduced Detroit's non-resident income tax;
5. (tie) The resurgence of the state's economy, including a decline in unemployment and a state budget surplus of $282 million;
7. The sentencing of Upjohn heir Roger A. Gauntlett, age 43, to "chemical castration" (through five years of treatment with Depo-Provera) for the repeated rape of his teenage stepdaughter. (The Depo-Provera aspect of the sentence was later reversed on appeal.)
8. (tie) The tarnishing of Detroit's image due to violent outbreaks in October, including a shooting death and other violence amid the celebration of the Detroit Tigers' October 14 victory in the 1984 World Series, and hundreds of fires set in Detroit on October 30, "Devil's night";
8. (tie) The federal civil rights trial, following protests over lenient state court sentencing (probation and fines), of Chrysler plant superintendent Ronald Ebens and his stepson, Michael Nitz, in the racially motivated Murder of Vincent Chin, a Chinese American man who was beaten to death in June 1982 with a baseball bat after an altercation at the Fancy Pants Lounge, a Woodward Avenue strip club. Ebens was convicted on June 28 in the federal case and sentenced on September 18 to 25 years in federal prison. (The appellate court later ordered a new trial that resulted in Ebens' acquittal on May 1, 1987.)
10. (tie) The comeback of Chrysler Corporation after repaying federal loan guarantees in 1983 and achieving record earnings of $803 million in the quarter from April to June 1984; and
10. (tie) The House of Judah controversies, including the trial and conviction of three members of the religious camp in South Haven arising out of the July 1983 beating death of 12-year-old John Yarbough, the conviction of another member for raping a 13-year-old girl, the removal of 66 children from the camp, and the death of two other children in a mobile home fire in October 1984.

== Office holders ==
=== State office holders ===
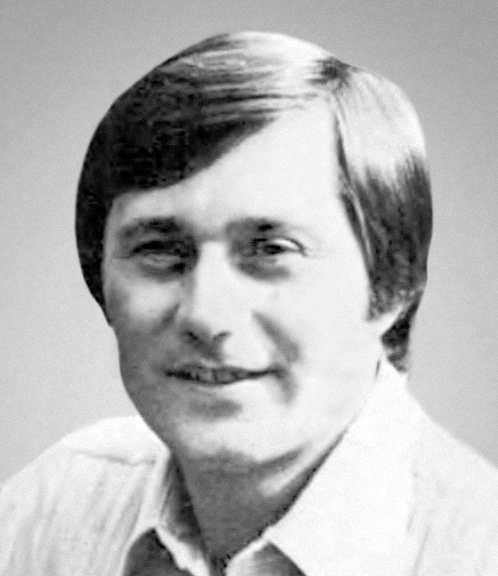
Gov. Blanchard

- Governor of Michigan: James Blanchard (Democrat)
- Lieutenant Governor of Michigan: Martha Griffiths (Democrat)
- Michigan Attorney General: Frank J. Kelley (Democrat)
- Michigan Secretary of State: Richard H. Austin (Democrat)
- Speaker of the Michigan House of Representatives: Gary Owen (Democrat)
- Majority Leader of the Michigan Senate: William Faust (Democrat)/John Engler (Republican)
- Chief Justice, Michigan Supreme Court: G. Mennen Williams

=== Mayors of major cities ===
- Mayor of Detroit: Coleman Young
- Mayor of Grand Rapids: Abe L. Drasin
- Mayor of Warren, Michigan: James R. Randlett
- Mayor of Sterling Heights, Michigan: Arthur Madar
- Mayor of Flint: James A. Sharp, Jr.
- Mayor of Dearborn: John O'Reilly, Sr.
- Mayor of Lansing: Terry John McKane
- Mayor of Ann Arbor: Louis Belcher (Republican)
- Mayor of Saginaw: Lawrence D. Crawford

=== Federal office holders ===
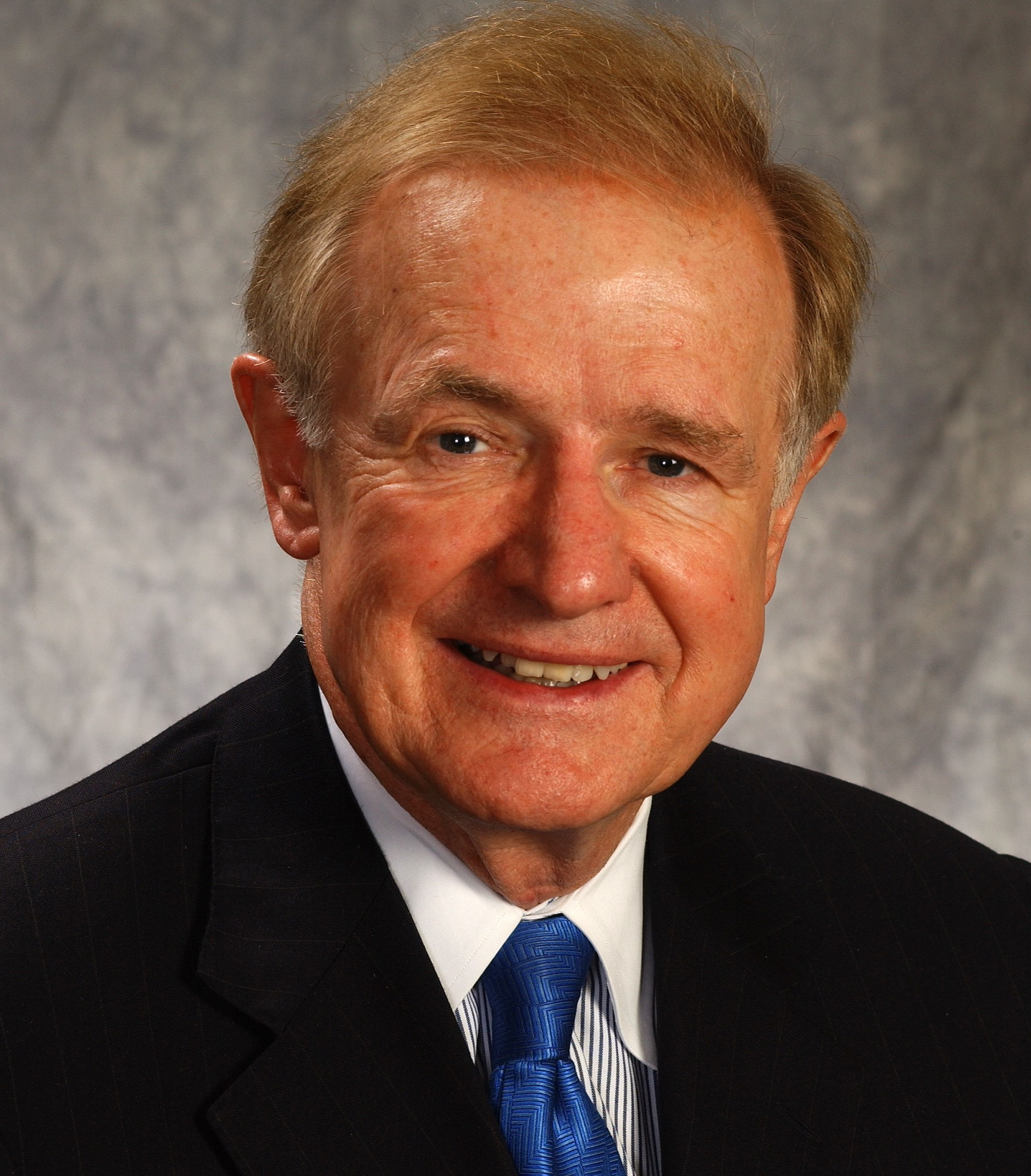
Sen. Riegle

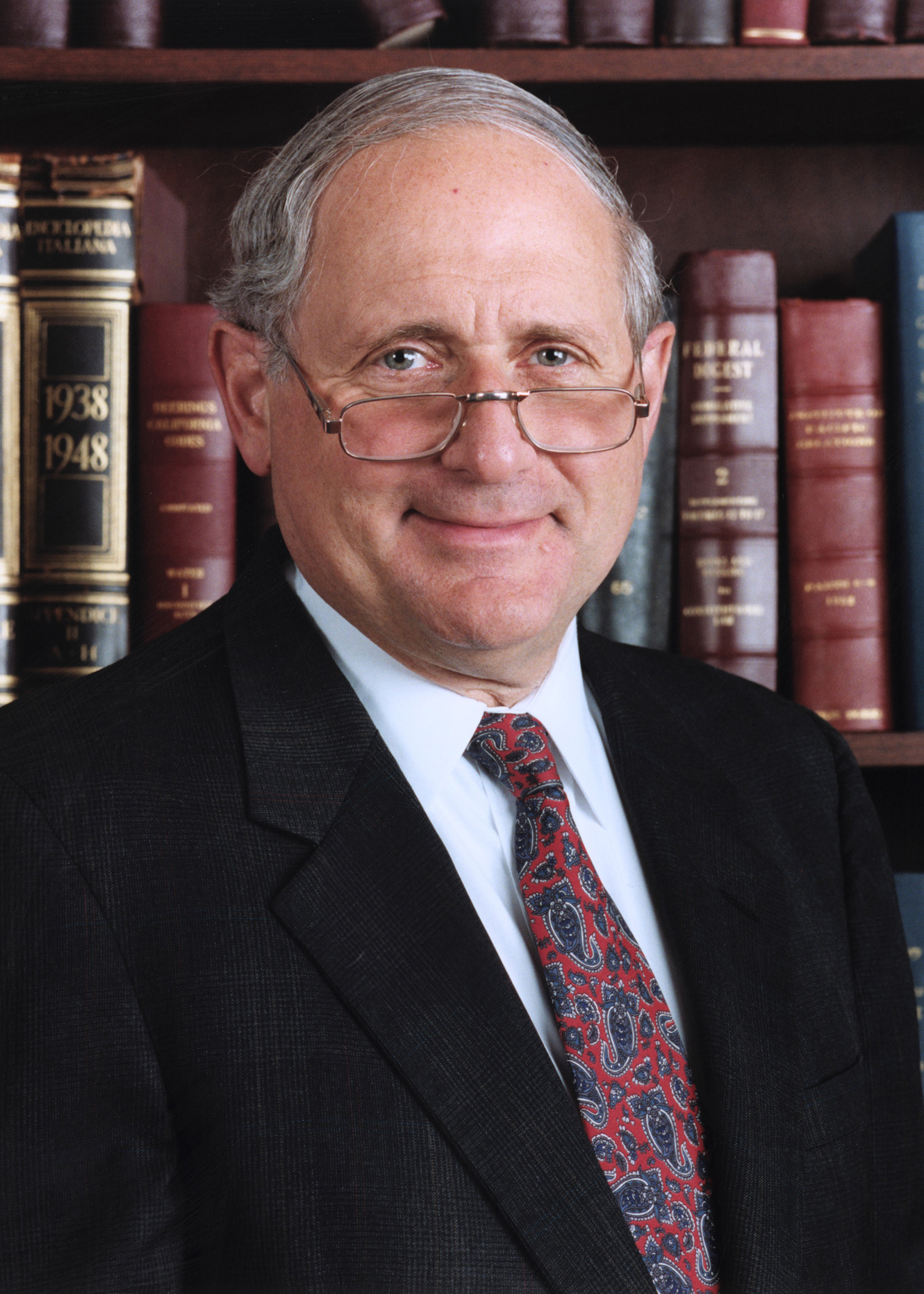
Sen. Levin

- U.S. Senator from Michigan: Donald W. Riegle Jr. (Democrat)
- U.S. Senator from Michigan: Carl Levin (Democrat)
- House District 1: John Conyers (Democrat)
- House District 2: Carl Pursell (Republican)
- House District 3: Howard Wolpe (Republican)
- House District 4: Mark D. Siljander (Republican)
- House District 5: Harold S. Sawyer (Republican)
- House District 6: Bob Dunn (Democrat)
- House District 7: Dale Kildee (Democrat)
- House District 8: J. Bob Traxler (Democrat)
- House District 9: Guy Vander Jagt (Republican)
- House District 10: Donald J. Albosta (Democrat)
- House District 11: Robert William Davis (Republican)
- House District 12: David Bonior (Democrat)
- House District 13: George Crockett Jr. (Democrat)
- House District 14: Dennis M. Hertel (Democrat)
- House District 15: William D. Ford (Democrat)
- House District 16: John Dingell (Democrat)
- House District 17: Sander Levin (Democrat)
- House District 18: William Broomfield (Republican)

== Population ==
In the 1980 United States census, Michigan was recorded as having a population of 9,259,000 persons, ranking as the eighth most populous state in the country. By 1990, the state's population had grown only marginally by 0.4% to 9,259,000 persons.

=== Cities ===
The following is a list of cities in Michigan with a population of at least 50,000 based on 1980 U.S. Census data. Historic census data from 1970 and 1990 is included to reflect trends in population increases or decreases. Cities that are part of the Detroit metropolitan area are shaded in tan.

1980 Rank	City	County	1970 Pop.	1980 Pop.	1990 Pop.	Change 1980-90
1	Detroit	Wayne	1,514,063	1,203,368	1,027,974	−14.6% ▼
2	Grand Rapids	Kent	197,649	181,843	189,126	4.0% ▲
3	Warren	Macomb	179,260	161,134	144,864	−10.1% ▼
4	Flint	Genesee	193,317	159,611	140,761	−11.8% ▼
5	Lansing	Ingham	131,403	130,414	127,321	−2.4% ▼
6	Sterling Heights	Macomb	61,365	108,999	117,810	8.1% ▲
7	Ann Arbor	Washtenaw	100,035	107,969	109,592	1.5% ▲
8	Livonia	Wayne	110,109	104,814	100,850	−3.8% ▼
9	Dearborn	Wayne	104,199	90,660	89,286	−1.5%▼
10	Westland	Wayne	86,749	84,603	84,724	0.1% ▲
11	Kalamazoo	Kalamazoo	85,555	79,722	80,277	0.7% ▲
12	Taylor	Wayne	70,020	77,568	70,811	−8.7% ▼
13	Saginaw	Saginaw	91,849	77,508	69,512	−10.3% ▼
14	Pontiac	Oakland	85,279	76,715	71,166	−7.2% ▼
15	St. Clair Shores	Macomb	88,093	76,210	68,107	−10.6% ▼
16	Southfield	Oakland	69,298	75,608	75,745	0.2% ▲
17	Royal Oak	Oakland	86,238	70,893	65,410	−7.7% ▼
18	Dearborn Heights	Wayne	80,069	67,706	60,838	−10.1% ▼
19	Troy	Oakland	39,419	67,102	72,884	8.6% ▲
20	Wyoming	Kent	56,560	59,616	63,891	7.2% ▲
21	Farmington Hills	Oakland	--	58,056	74,611	28.5% ▲
22	Roseville	Macomb	60,529	54,311	51,412	−5.3% ▼
23	East Lansing	Ingham	47,540	51,392	50,677	−1.4% ▼

=== Counties ===
The following is a list of counties in Michigan with populations of at least 100,000 based on 1980 U.S. Census data. Historic census data from 1970 and 1990 are included to reflect trends in population increases or decreases. Counties that are part of the Detroit metropolitan area are shaded in tan.

1980 Rank	County	Largest city	1970 Pop.	1980 Pop.	1990 Pop.	Change 1980-90
1	Wayne	Detroit	2,666,751	2,337,891	2,111,687	−9.7% ▼
2	Oakland	Pontiac	907,871	1,011,793	1,083,592	7.1% ▲
3	Macomb	Warren	625,309	694,600	717,400	3.3% ▲
4	Genesee	Flint	444,341	450,449	430,459	−4.4% ▼
5	Kent	Grand Rapids	411,044	444,506	500,631	12.6% ▲
6	Ingham	Lansing	261,039	275,520	281,912	2.3% ▲
7	Washtenaw	Ann Arbor	234,103	264,748	282,937	6.9% ▲
8	Saginaw	Saginaw	219,743	228,059	211,946	−7.1% ▼
9	Kalamazoo	Kalamazoo	201,550	212,378	223,411	5.2% ▲
10	Berrien	Benton Harbor	163,875	171,276	161,378	−5.8% ▼
11	Muskegon	Muskegon	157,426	157,589	158,983	0.9% ▲
12	Ottawa	Holland	128,181	157,174	187,768	19.5% ▲
13	Jackson	Jackson	143,274	151,495	149,756	−1.1% ▼
14	Calhoun	Battle Creek	141,963	141,557	135,982	−3.9% ▼
15	St. Clair	Port Huron	120,175	138,802	145,607	4.9% ▲
16	Monroe	Monroe	118,479	134,659	133,600	−0.8% ▼
17	Bay	Bay City	117,339	119,881	111,723	−6.8% ▼
18	Livingston	Howell	58,967	100,289	115,645	15.3% ▲

== Sports ==
=== Baseball ===
- 1984 Detroit Tigers season – Under manager Sparky Anderson, the Tigers compiled a 104–58 record, finished first in the American League East, defeated the Kansas City Royals in the 1984 American League Championship Series, and defeated the San Diego Padres in the 1984 World Series. The team's statistical leaders included Alan Trammell with a .314 batting average, Lance Parrish with 33 home runs and 98 RBIs, Jack Morris with 19 wins, and Willie Hernández with a 1.92 earned run average (ERA). Hernandez was selected as the American League's Most Valuable Player.

=== American football ===
- 1984 Detroit Lions season – The Lions, under head coach Monte Clark, compiled a 4–11–1 record and finished fourth in the NFC Central Division. The team's statistical leaders included Gary Danielson with 3,076 passing yards, Billy Sims with 687 rushing yards, Leonard Thompson with 773 receiving yards, and Eddie Murray with 91 points scored.
- 1984 Michigan Wolverines football team – Under head coach Bo Schembechler, the Wolverines compiled a 6–6 record, including a loss to No. 1 BYU in the Holiday Bowl. The team's statistical leaders included Jim Harbaugh with 718 passing yards, Jamie Morris with 573 rushing yards, Sim Nelson with 459 receiving yards, and Bob Bergeron with 60 points scored.

=== Basketball ===
- 1983–84 Detroit Pistons season – Under head coach Chuck Daly, the Pistons compiled a 49–33 record and finished second in the NBA's Central Division. The team's statistical leaders included Isiah Thomas with 1,784 points and 914 assists and Bill Laimbeer with 1,003 rebounds.

=== Ice hockey ===
- 1983–84 Detroit Red Wings season – Under head coach Nick Polano, the Red Wings compiled a 31–42–7 record and finished third in the National Hockey League's Norris Division. The team's statistical leaders included Steve Yzerman with 87 points, John Ogrodnick with 42 goals and Brad Park with 53 assists. The team's regular goaltenders were Greg Stefan (50 games), Eddie Mio (24 games), and Corrado Micalef (14 games).

== Music and culture ==
- January 1984 - Ted Nugent's album Pentrator was released and reached No. 56 on the Billboard 200 album chart.
- February 1984 - Madonna's song "Borderline" was released as a single and reached No. 10 on the Billboard Hot 100.
- March 1984 - The Big Chill (soundtrack), featuring Motown hits, was certified platinum.
- May 1984 - "Ghostbusters", the title song from the movie recorded by Detroit native Ray Parker Jr. was released and reached No. 1 on the Billboard Hot 100 in August.
- June 1984 - Glenn Frey's album The Allnighter was released and reached No. 22 on the Billboard album chart. The album included the single "Smuggler's Blues".
- August 1984 - Stevie Wonder's "I Just Called to Say I Love You" from The Woman in Red (soundtrack) was released. It reached No. 1 on the Billboard Hot 100 and won the Academy Award for Best Original Song.
- September 1984 - Diana Ross' album Swept Away was released. The single "Missing You", a tribute to Marvin Gaye, was Ross' final top ten on the Billboard Hot 100.
- November 1984 - Madonna's album Like a Virgin was released and reached No. 1 on the Billboard album chart. The album included hit singles "Material Girl" (No. 2), "Like a Virgin" (No. 1), and "Angel" (No. 5).

== Chronology of events ==
=== January ===
- January 2 - Coleman Young celebrated the 10th anniversary of his inauguration as Mayor of Detroit.
- January 2 - No. 8 Michigan lost to No. 3 Auburn by a 9–7 score in the 1984 Sugar Bowl. Al Del Greco kicked three field goals for Auburn.
- January 6 - The Census Bureau issued a report showing the cities over 50,000 population with the highest percentage of homes occupied by their owners. Redford Township ranked first in the nation with a 91.4% rate of owner-occupied housing. Livonia ranked second at 90.24%; Dearborn Heights was fifth with 85.76%; and St. Clair Shores was seventh with 84.06%.
- January 8 - Jesse Jackson held a rally attended by 7,000 persons at Calihan Hall at the University of Detroit in support of his presidential campaign.
- January 9 - The Supreme Court rejected a challenge to a Detroit Police Department requiring promotion of equal numbers of white and black officers.
- January 9 - General Motors' Board of Directors approved a reorganization consolidating the company's five car divisions into two new groups, one for large cars and the other for small cars.
- January 11 - Fred Cummings resigned as director of the Detroit Institute of Arts after months of controversy over his management of the museum.
- January 20 - Two House of Judah members were sentenced to a year in prison and five years probation for child cruelty in the beating death of a 12-year-old boy.
- January 21 - Detroit recorded a temperature of 21 degrees below zero, the coldest recording in the city since 1872.
- January 26 - Astronaut Jack Lousma announced his candidacy for the Republican nomination to challenge Carl Levin for his seat in the U.S. Senate
- January 29 - Isaiah Thomas was named the MVP of the NBA All-Star Game.
- January 30 - Upjohn pharmaceutical heir Roger Gauntlett was sentenced to one year in county jail and five years of probation and ordered to take and experimental drug to reduce the male sex drive. He had been convicted of repeatedly raping his teenage stepdaughter over a seven-year period. The drug, Depo-Provera, was manufactured by Upjohn. In announcing the sentence, the judge described the treatment as "castration by chemical means".
- January 31 - In special elections to fill the seats of two Democratic members of the Michigan Senate (both had been recalled for supporting an income tax increase), Republican candidates won both contests. The victories gave Republicans control of the Senate for the first time in 10 years.
- A Michigan State University judicial board found the school's marching band director, Stanley DeRusha, had sexually harassed six women students, including coerced oral sex and multiple instances of sexual touching. DeRusha had been the band director since 1978.

== Births ==
- January 12 - Scott Olsen, baseball pitcher, in Kalamazoo
- February 9 - Maurice Ager, basketball player, in Detroit
- February 12 - Peter Vanderkaay, swimmer and four-time Olympic medalist, in Royal Oak, Michigan
- March 1 - Naima Mora, model and winner of Cycle 4 of America's Next Top Model, in Detroit
- March 7 - Brandon T. Jackson, stand-up comedian, rapper, actor, and writer, in Detroit
- May 7 - Drew Stanton, American football quarterback, in Okemos, Michigan
- June 1 - Jennie Ritter, softball pitcher, in Dexter, Michigan
- June 23 - Walshy, professional gamer, in Grandville, Michigan
- July 21 - Paul Davis, basketball player, in Rochester, Michigan
- August 28 - Denmark Vessey, rapper and record producer, in Dearborn, Michigan
- August 30 - Joe Staley, American football player, in Rockford, Michigan
- October 31 - Abdul El-Sayed, doctor, public health expert, and political activist, in Detroit
- November 30 - LaMarr Woodley, American football linebacker and winner of the Lombardi and Hendricks Awards in 2006, in Saginaw, Michigan

== Deaths ==
- January 11 - Peter Licavoli, organized crime figure, at age 81 in Tucson, Arizona
- January 21 - Jackie Wilson, singer and Detroit native, at age 49 in New Jersey
- January 21 - Rebecca Shelley, pacifist, at age 97 in Battle Creek, Michigan
- March 18 - Charley Lau, baseball catcher and hitting coach, at age 50 in Florida
- April 1 - Marvin Gaye, Motown singer, at age 44 in Los Angeles
- April 29 - Neno DaPrato, American football fullback, at age 91 in Pennsylvania
- July 14 - Philippé Wynne, singer and member of The Spinners, at age 43 in Oakland, California
- July 15 - Marcus Plant, law professor and athletic administrator, at age 72 in Ann Arbor
- July 27 - C. L. Franklin, Baptist minister, civil rights activist, and father of Aretha Franklin, at age 69 in Detroit
- August 14 - Bobo Jenkins, Detroit blues and electric blues guitarist, singer and songwriter, at age 68 in Detroit

== See also ==
- History of Michigan
- History of Detroit
