= 1987 in Michigan =

- Decades: 1960s; 1970s; 1980s; 1990s; 2000s
- See also: History of Michigan; Historical outline of Michigan; List of years in Michigan; 1987 in the United States

Events from the year 1987 in Michigan.

== Top Michigan news stories ==
The Associated Press (AP) selected the top stories in Michigan for 1987 as follows:

1. The August 16 crash of Northwest Airlines Flight 255 on takeoff from Detroit, killing 154 of 155 persons on board and two persons on the ground. The crash was the second deadliest in US history to that date. The sole survivor was a child, Cecilia Cichan.
2. Pope John Paul II's visit to the Detroit area on September 18 and 19, including appearances in Hamtramck and Hart Plaza and a mass at the Pontiac Silverdome.
3. The July 10 murder of three Inkster police officers while serving a bad check warrant at the Bungalow Motel.
4. Three-year labor agreements between the United Auto Workers and Ford and GM with provisions for job protection.
5. The Michigan Legislature voted to increase of the state speed limit to 65 miles per hour on 720 miles of rural highway.
6. The Michigan Legislature voted to prohibit the use of state funds for abortions.
7. The March 4 death of nine persons in the crash of a Northwest Metrolink plane at Detroit Metro Airport.
8. The death of Henry Ford II on September 29 at age 70.
9. The August merger of Chrysler and American Motors Corporation.
10. The October deaths of three Milford firefighters in a training accident.

The AP also separately suggested the state's top sports stories as follows:

1. The 1987 Detroit Tigers season in which the team finished with a Major League-best record of 98-64 and won the American League East.
2. The 1987 Michigan State Spartans football team compiled a 9–2–1, won the Big Ten championship, and defeated USC in the Rose Bowl.
3. The 1986–87 Detroit Pistons season, known as the "Bad Boys" because of their physical style of play, compiled a 52–30 record and took the Boston Celtics to seven games in the Eastern Conference finals.
4. The 1986–87 Detroit Red Wings season in which the team, led by Steve Yzerman, compiled a 34–36–10 record, swept the Chicago Blackhawks in four games in the opening round of the playoffs, rallied from a 3–1 deficit against the Toronto Maple Leafs in the division final, before losing to the Edmonton Oilers in five games in the conference final.
5. Alan Trammell hit for a .343 batting average and finished second in voting for the American League Most Valuable Player award.
6. Boxer Thomas Hearns won a record fourth title. He had previously won welterweight and junior middleweight titles. He won his third title (WBC light heavyweight) on March 7, 1987, in a bout with Dennis Andries at Cobo Arena in Detroit. He won the fourth title (WBC middleweight) on October 29, 1987, with a fourth-round knockout of Juan Roldan in Las Vegas.
7. Jack Morris' arbitration with the Detroit Tigers, resulting in an award on February 13 granting Morris a $1.85 salary, the richest salary in baseball arbitration to that date and an increase of $975,000 over his 1986 salary.
8. After 10 years with the Detroit Tigers, Lance Parrish signed prior to the 1987 season as a free agent with the Philadelphia Phillies.
9. Rookie catcher Matt Nokes hit 32 home runs and was named to the American League All-Star team.
10. For the second time in four years, Sparky Anderson was selected by the Baseball Writers' Association of America as the American League Manager of the Year.

== Office holders ==
=== State office holders ===
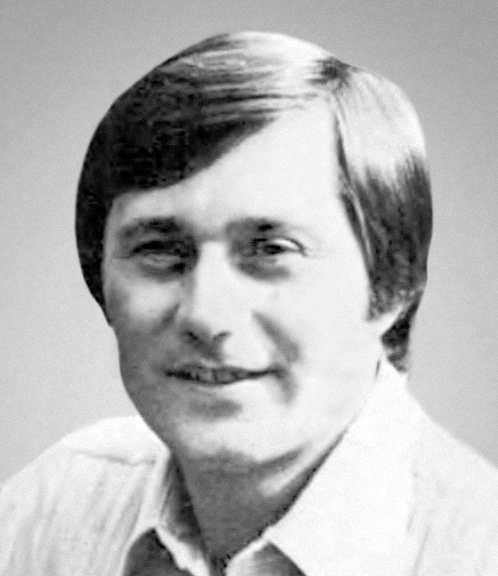
Gov. Blanchard

- Governor of Michigan: James Blanchard (Democrat)
- Lieutenant Governor of Michigan: Martha Griffiths (Democrat)
- Michigan Attorney General: Frank J. Kelley (Democrat)
- Michigan Secretary of State: Richard H. Austin (Democrat)
- Speaker of the Michigan House of Representatives: Gary Owen (Democrat)
- Majority Leader of the Michigan Senate: John Engler (Republican)
- Chief Justice, Michigan Supreme Court: Dorothy C. Riley

=== Mayors of major cities ===
- Mayor of Detroit: Coleman Young
- Mayor of Grand Rapids: Gerald R. Helmholdt
- Mayor of Warren, Michigan: Ronald L. Bonkowski
- Mayor of Sterling Heights, Michigan: Jean DiRezze Gush
- Mayor of Flint: James A. Sharp, Jr.
- Mayor of Dearborn: Michael Guido
- Mayor of Lansing: Terry John McKane
- Mayor of Ann Arbor: Edward C. Pierce (Democrat)/Gerald Jernigan (Republican)
- Mayor of Saginaw: Lawrence D. Crawford/Delbert J. Schrems

=== Federal office holders ===
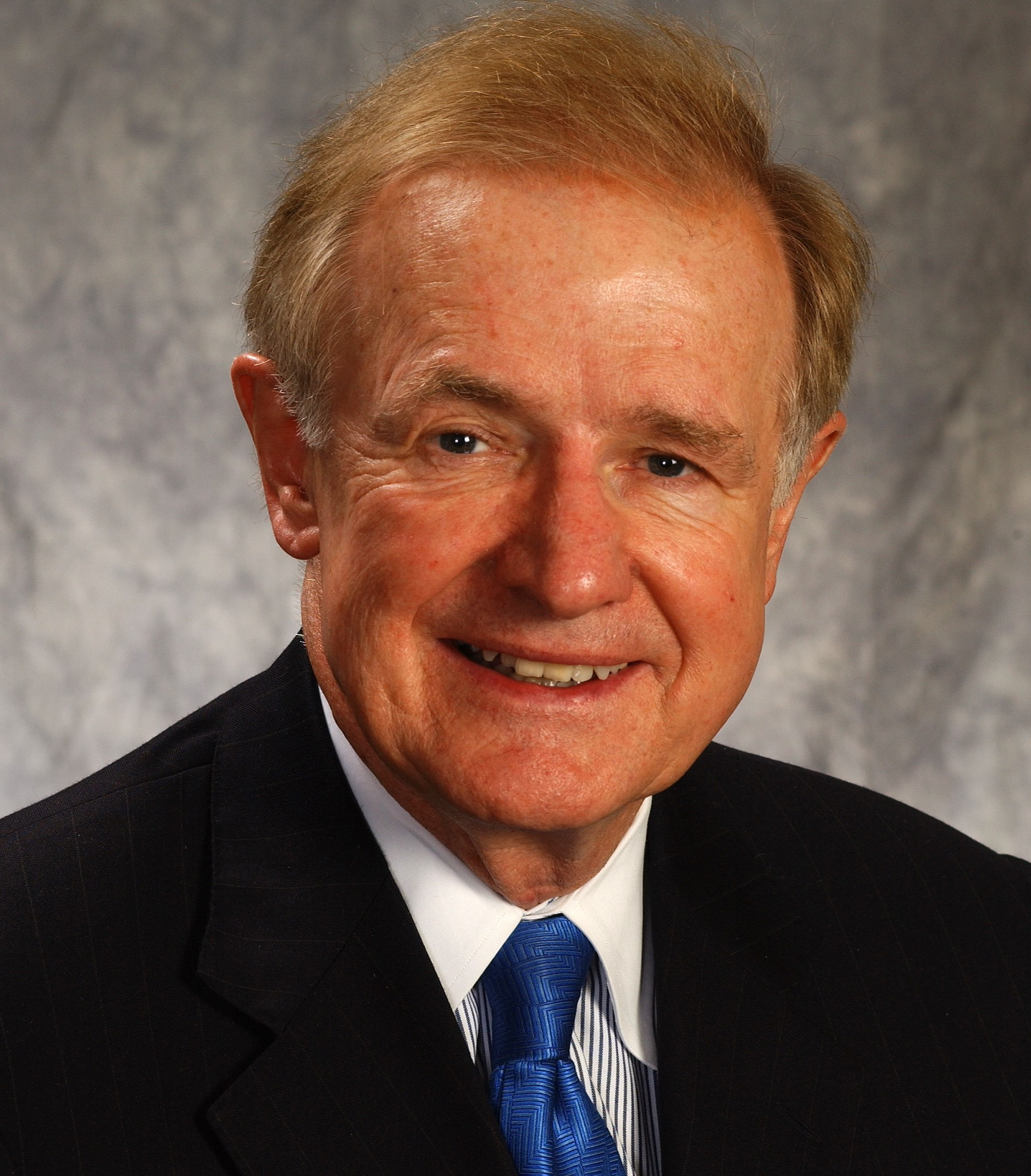
Sen. Riegle

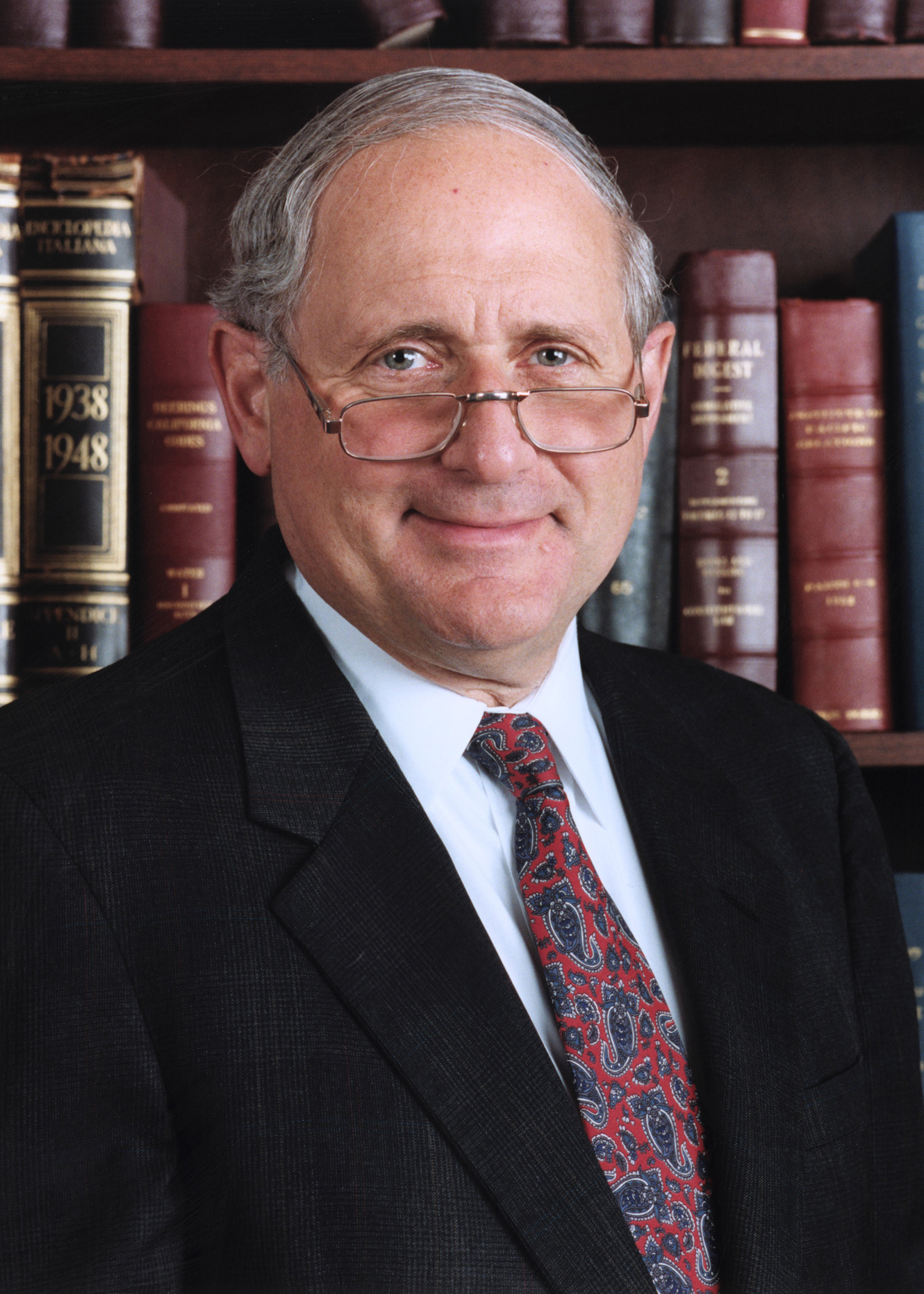
Sen. Levin

- U.S. Senator from Michigan: Donald W. Riegle Jr. (Democrat)
- U.S. Senator from Michigan: Carl Levin (Democrat)
- House District 1: John Conyers (Democrat)
- House District 2: Carl Pursell (Republican)
- House District 3: Howard Wolpe (Republican)
- House District 4: Mark D. Siljander (Republican)
- House District 5: Harold S. Sawyer (Republican)
- House District 6: Bob Carr (Democrat)
- House District 7: Dale Kildee (Democrat)
- House District 8: J. Bob Traxler (Democrat)
- House District 9: Guy Vander Jagt (Republican)
- House District 10: Bill Schuette (Republican)
- House District 11: Robert William Davis (Republican)
- House District 12: David Bonior (Democrat)
- House District 13: George Crockett Jr. (Democrat)
- House District 14: Dennis M. Hertel (Democrat)
- House District 15: William D. Ford (Democrat)
- House District 16: John Dingell (Democrat)
- House District 17: Sander Levin (Democrat)
- House District 18: William Broomfield (Republican)

== Population ==
In the 1980 United States census, Michigan was recorded as having a population of 9,259,000 persons, ranking as the eighth most populous state in the country. By 1990, the state's population had grown only marginally by 0.4% to 9,259,000 persons.

=== Cities ===
The following is a list of cities in Michigan with a population of at least 50,000 based on 1980 U.S. Census data. Historic census data from 1970 and 1990 is included to reflect trends in population increases or decreases. Cities that are part of the Detroit metropolitan area are shaded in tan.

1980 Rank	City	County	1970 Pop.	1980 Pop.	1990 Pop.	Change 1980-90
1	Detroit	Wayne	1,514,063	1,203,368	1,027,974	−14.6% ▼
2	Grand Rapids	Kent	197,649	181,843	189,126	4.0% ▲
3	Warren	Macomb	179,260	161,134	144,864	−10.1% ▼
4	Flint	Genesee	193,317	159,611	140,761	−11.8% ▼
5	Lansing	Ingham	131,403	130,414	127,321	−2.4% ▼
6	Sterling Heights	Macomb	61,365	108,999	117,810	8.1% ▲
7	Ann Arbor	Washtenaw	100,035	107,969	109,592	1.5% ▲
8	Livonia	Wayne	110,109	104,814	100,850	−3.8% ▼
9	Dearborn	Wayne	104,199	90,660	89,286	−1.5%▼
10	Westland	Wayne	86,749	84,603	84,724	0.1% ▲
11	Kalamazoo	Kalamazoo	85,555	79,722	80,277	0.7% ▲
12	Taylor	Wayne	70,020	77,568	70,811	−8.7% ▼
13	Saginaw	Saginaw	91,849	77,508	69,512	−10.3% ▼
14	Pontiac	Oakland	85,279	76,715	71,166	−7.2% ▼
15	St. Clair Shores	Macomb	88,093	76,210	68,107	−10.6% ▼
16	Southfield	Oakland	69,298	75,608	75,745	0.2% ▲
17	Royal Oak	Oakland	86,238	70,893	65,410	−7.7% ▼
18	Dearborn Heights	Wayne	80,069	67,706	60,838	−10.1% ▼
19	Troy	Oakland	39,419	67,102	72,884	8.6% ▲
20	Wyoming	Kent	56,560	59,616	63,891	7.2% ▲
21	Farmington Hills	Oakland	--	58,056	74,611	28.5% ▲
22	Roseville	Macomb	60,529	54,311	51,412	−5.3% ▼
23	East Lansing	Ingham	47,540	51,392	50,677	−1.4% ▼

=== Counties ===
The following is a list of counties in Michigan with populations of at least 100,000 based on 1980 U.S. Census data. Historic census data from 1970 and 1990 are included to reflect trends in population increases or decreases. Counties that are part of the Detroit metropolitan area are shaded in tan.

1980 Rank	County	Largest city	1970 Pop.	1980 Pop.	1990 Pop.	Change 1980-90
1	Wayne	Detroit	2,666,751	2,337,891	2,111,687	−9.7% ▼
2	Oakland	Pontiac	907,871	1,011,793	1,083,592	7.1% ▲
3	Macomb	Warren	625,309	694,600	717,400	3.3% ▲
4	Genesee	Flint	444,341	450,449	430,459	−4.4% ▼
5	Kent	Grand Rapids	411,044	444,506	500,631	12.6% ▲
6	Ingham	Lansing	261,039	275,520	281,912	2.3% ▲
7	Washtenaw	Ann Arbor	234,103	264,748	282,937	6.9% ▲
8	Saginaw	Saginaw	219,743	228,059	211,946	−7.1% ▼
9	Kalamazoo	Kalamazoo	201,550	212,378	223,411	5.2% ▲
10	Berrien	Benton Harbor	163,875	171,276	161,378	−5.8% ▼
11	Muskegon	Muskegon	157,426	157,589	158,983	0.9% ▲
12	Ottawa	Holland	128,181	157,174	187,768	19.5% ▲
13	Jackson	Jackson	143,274	151,495	149,756	−1.1% ▼
14	Calhoun	Battle Creek	141,963	141,557	135,982	−3.9% ▼
15	St. Clair	Port Huron	120,175	138,802	145,607	4.9% ▲
16	Monroe	Monroe	118,479	134,659	133,600	−0.8% ▼
17	Bay	Bay City	117,339	119,881	111,723	−6.8% ▼
18	Livingston	Howell	58,967	100,289	115,645	15.3% ▲

== Births ==
- January 6 - Ndamukong Suh, 3× first-team All-Pro (2010, 2013, 2014) as a defensive tackle for the Detroit Lions, in Portland, Oregon
- November 5 - Sienna, professional wrestler, in Detroit

== Deaths ==
- April 24 - Larry Bethea, Michigan State football player who was named MVP in the Big Ten in 1977, at age 30 in Virginia
- August 16 - Nick Vanos of the Phoenix Suns, one of 154 persons killed in the crash of Northwest Airlines Flight 255
- September 25 - Duffy Daugherty, head football coach at Michigan State from 1954 to 1972, at age 72 in Santa Barbara, California
- September 29 - Henry Ford II, president of the Ford Motor Company from 1945 to 1960, at age 70 in Detroit,
- October 18 - Louis Miriani, Mayor of Detroit from 1957 to 1962, the last Republican to hold the office, at age 90 in Pontiac, Michigan

== See also ==
- History of Michigan
- History of Detroit
