= 1990 in Michigan =

- Decades: 1970s; 1980s; 1990s; 2000s; 2010s
- See also: History of Michigan; Historical outline of Michigan; List of years in Michigan; 1990 in the United States

Events from the year 1990 in Michigan.

== Top Michigan news stories ==
Broadcast and newspaper members of the Associated Press voted on the top news stories in Michigan for 1990 as follows:

1. On November 6, 1990, State Senator John Engler upset incumbent Governor James Blanchard in the closest gubernatorial election in Michigan history. Engler received 1,279,745 votes, and Blanchard received 1,260,611 votes. A poll by The Detroit News, released two days before the election, showed Blanchard with 54% to 40% for Engler.
2. On June 3, 1990, Dr. Jack Kevorkian, a retired pathologist living in Royal Oak, assisted Janet Adkins, a 54-year-old Alzheimer's patient from Oregon, to end her life using his homemade suicide machine. On December 3, 1990, Kevorkian was charged with murder for his role in Adkins' death. The charges were dismissed 10 days later when an Oakland County judge ruled that the legal status of assisted suicide was unclear.
3. In November 1990, as part of the Keating Five investigation, the U.S. Senate Ethics Committee conducted hearings into ties between Senator Donald Riegle and former thrift operator Charles Keating, a central figure in the savings and loan crisis of the late 1980s. The committee ultimately concluded that Riegle and the other four senators "broke no laws or Senate ethics rules, but were aggressive in their actions on behalf of Charles Keating."
4. In August 1990, Governor James Blanchard dropped 78-year-old Lieutenant Governor Martha Griffiths as his running mate.
5. A new law took effect in Michigan requiring girls 17 and younger to obtain parental consent to abortions.
6. In June 1990, Lawrence DeLisle was convicted by a jury in the Murder of the DeLisle children for driving the family's station wagon into the Detroit River in Wyandotte.
7. On September 18, 1990, the M. V. Jupiter, a 393-foot tanker carrying a million gallons of gasoline, exploded and burned at a dock on the Saginaw River in Bay City. One crewman was killed.
8. Former Detroit deputy police chief Kenneth Weiner was tried for fraud. He was convicted in January 1991.
9. The search for a low-level radioactive waste dump.
10. On December 3, 1990, in the 1990 Wayne County Airport runway collision, two Northwest Airlines planes collided on the ground in dense fog. Eight persons were killed.

== Office holders ==
=== State office holders ===
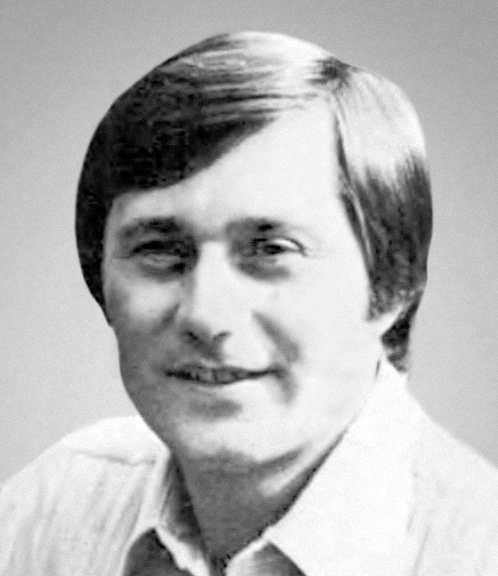
Gov. Blanchard

- Governor of Michigan: James Blanchard (Democrat)
- Lieutenant Governor of Michigan: Martha Griffiths (Democrat)
- Michigan Attorney General: Frank J. Kelley (Democrat)
- Michigan Secretary of State: Richard H. Austin (Democrat)
- Speaker of the Michigan House of Representatives: Lewis N. Dodak (Democrat)
- Majority Leader of the Michigan Senate: John Engler (Republican)
- Chief Justice, Michigan Supreme Court: Dorothy C. Riley

=== Mayors of major cities ===
- Mayor of Detroit: Coleman Young
- Mayor of Grand Rapids: Gerald R. Helmholdt
- Mayor of Warren, Michigan: Ronald L. Bonkowski
- Mayor of Sterling Heights, Michigan: Jean DiRezze Gush
- Mayor of Flint: Matthew S. Collier
- Mayor of Dearborn: Michael Guido
- Mayor of Lansing: Terry John McKane
- Mayor of Ann Arbor: Gerald Jernigan (Republican)
- Mayor of Saginaw: Henry H. Nickleberry

=== Federal office holders ===
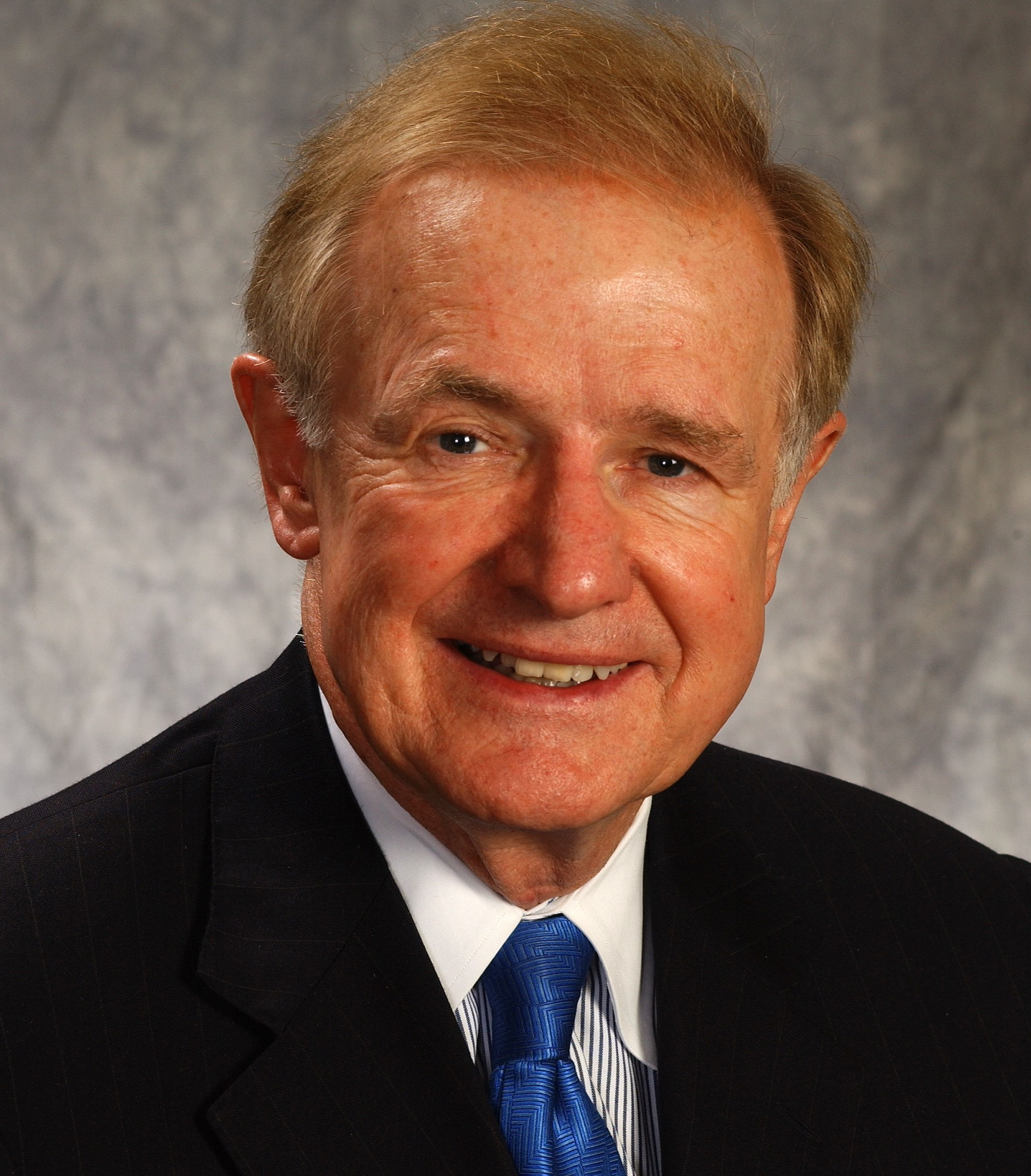
Sen. Riegle

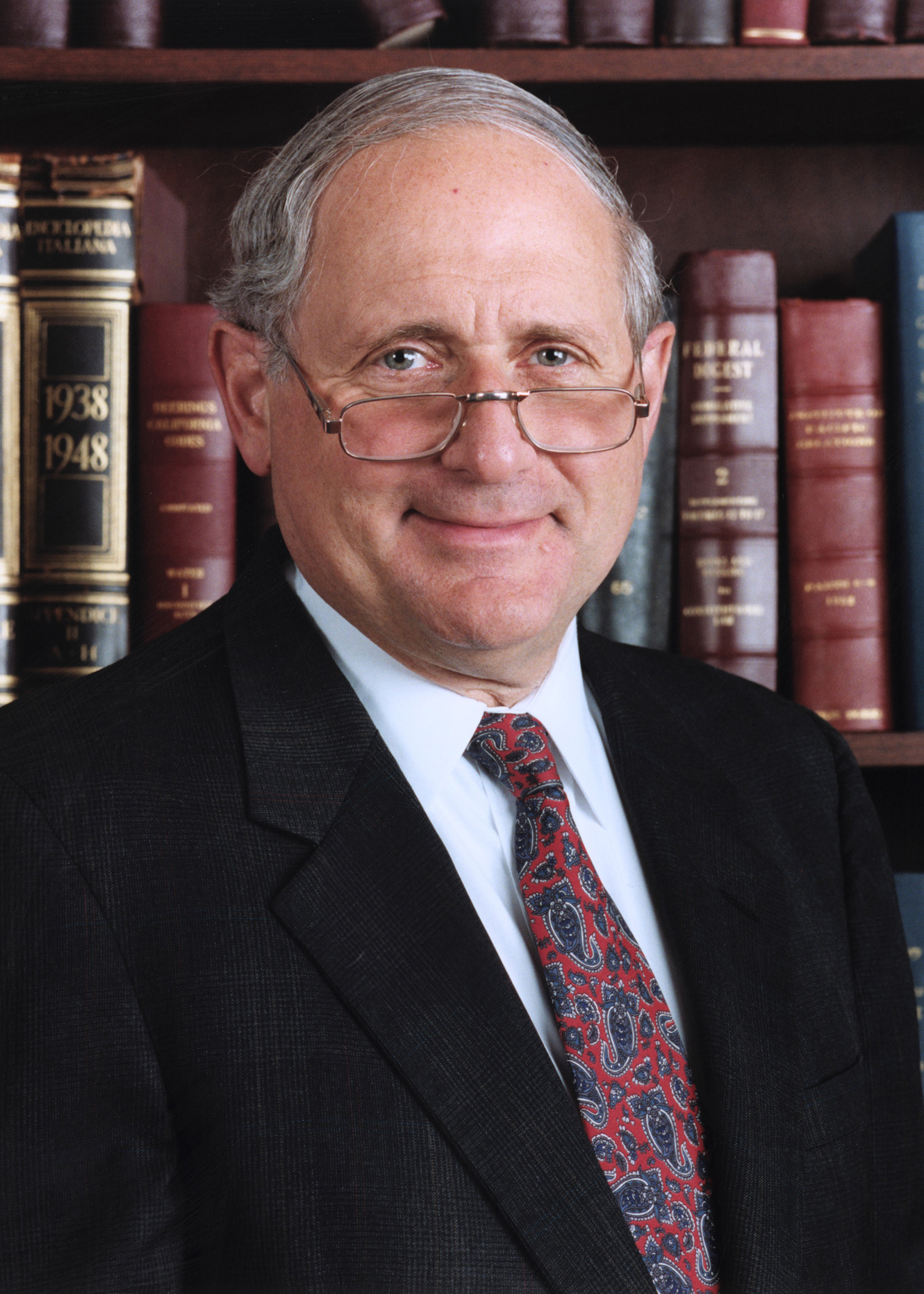
Sen. Levin

- U.S. Senator from Michigan: Donald W. Riegle Jr. (Democrat)
- U.S. Senator from Michigan: Carl Levin (Democrat)
- House District 1: John Conyers (Democrat)
- House District 2: Carl Pursell (Republican)
- House District 3: Howard Wolpe (Republican)
- House District 4: Fred Upton (Republican)
- House District 5: Harold S. Sawyer (Republican)
- House District 6: Bob Carr (Democrat)
- House District 7: Dale Kildee (Democrat)
- House District 8: J. Bob Traxler (Democrat)
- House District 9: Guy Vander Jagt (Republican)
- House District 10: Bill Schuette (Republican)
- House District 11: Robert William Davis (Republican)
- House District 12: David Bonior (Democrat)
- House District 13: George Crockett Jr. (Democrat)
- House District 14: Dennis M. Hertel (Democrat)
- House District 15: William D. Ford (Democrat)
- House District 16: John Dingell (Democrat)
- House District 17: Sander Levin (Democrat)
- House District 18: William Broomfield (Republican)

== Population ==
In the 1990 United States census, Michigan was recorded as having a population of 9,295,29 persons, ranking as the eighth most populous state in the country. By 2000, the state's population had grown by 6.9% to 9,938,444 persons.

=== Cities ===
The following is a list of cities in Michigan with a population of at least 50,000 based on 1990 U.S. Census data. Historic census data from 1980 and 2000 is included to reflect trends in population increases or decreases. Cities that are part of the Detroit metropolitan area are shaded in tan.

1990 Rank	City	County	1980 Pop.	1990 Pop.	2000 Pop.	Change 1990-2000
1	Detroit	Wayne	1,203,368	1,027,974	951,270	−7.5% ▼
2	Grand Rapids	Kent	181,843	189,126	197,800	4.6% ▲
3	Warren	Macomb	161,134	144,864	138,247	−4.6% ▼
4	Flint	Genesee	159,611	140,761	124,943	−11.2% ▼
5	Lansing	Ingham	130,414	127,321	119,128	−6.4% ▼
6	Sterling Heights	Macomb	108,999	117,810	124,471	5.7% ▲
7	Ann Arbor	Washtenaw	107,969	109,592	114,024	4.0% ▲
8	Livonia	Wayne	104,814	100,850	100,545	−0.3% ▼
9	Dearborn	Wayne	90,660	89,286	97,775	9.5%▼
10	Westland	Wayne	84,603	84,724	86,602	2.2% ▲
11	Kalamazoo	Kalamazoo	79,722	80,277	76,145	−5.1% ▼
12	Southfield	Oakland	75,608	75,745	78,322	3.4% ▲
13	Farmington Hills	Oakland	58,056	74,611	82,111	10.1% ▲
14	Troy	Oakland	67,102	72,884	80,959	11.1% ▲
15	Pontiac	Oakland	76,715	71,166	66,337	−6.8% ▼
16	Taylor	Wayne	77,568	70,811	65,868	−7.0% ▼
17	Saginaw	Saginaw	77,508	69,512	61,799	−11.1% ▼
18	St. Clair Shores	Macomb	76,210	68,107	63,096	−7.4% ▼
19	Royal Oak	Oakland	70,893	65,410	60,062	−8.2% ▼
20	Wyoming	Kent	59,616	63,891	69,368	8.6% ▲
21	Dearborn Heights	Wayne	67,706	60,838	58,264	−4.2% ▼
22	Roseville	Wayne	54,311	51,412	48,129	−6.4% ▼
23	East Lansing	Ingham	51,392	50,677	46,525	−8.2% ▼

=== Counties ===
The following is a list of counties in Michigan with populations of at least 150,000 based on 1990 U.S. Census data. Historic census data from 1980 and 2000 are included to reflect trends in population increases or decreases. Counties that are part of the Detroit metropolitan area are shaded in tan.

1990 Rank	County	Largest city	1980 Pop.	1990 Pop.	2000 Pop.	Change 1900-2000
1	Wayne	Detroit	2,337,891	2,111,687	2,061,162	−2.4% ▼
2	Oakland	Pontiac	1,011,793	1,083,592	1,194,156	10.2% ▲
3	Macomb	Warren	694,600	717,400	788,149	9.9% ▲
4	Kent	Grand Rapids	444,506	500,631	574,335	14.7% ▲
5	Genesee	Flint	450,449	430,459	436,141	1.3% ▼
6	Washtenaw	Ann Arbor	264,748	282,937	322,895	14.1% ▲
7	Ingham	Lansing	275,520	281,912	279,320	−0.9% ▼
8	Kalamazoo	Kalamazoo	212,378	223,411	238,603	6.8% ▲
9	Saginaw	Saginaw	228,059	211,946	210,039	−0.9% ▼
10	Ottawa	Holland	157,174	187,768	238,314	26.9% ▲
11	Berrien	Benton Harbor	171,276	161,378	162,453	0.6% ▲
12	Muskegon	Muskegon	157,589	158,983	170,200	7.1% ▲
13	Jackson	Jackson	151,495	149,756	158,422	5.8% ▼

== Sports ==
=== Baseball ===
- 1990 Detroit Tigers season – Under manager Sparky Anderson, the Tigers compiled a 79–83 record and finished third in American League East. The team's statistical leaders included Alan Trammell with a .304 batting average, Cecil Fielder with 51 home runs and 132 RBIs, Jack Morris with 15 wins, and Ed Nunez with a 2.24 earned run average.

=== American football ===
- 1990 Detroit Lions season – Under head coach Wayne Fontes, the Lions compiled a 6–10 record and finished third in the NFC Central Division. The team's statistical leaders included Rodney Peete with 1,974 passing yards, Barry Sanders with 1,304 rushing yards and 96 points scored, and Robert Clark with 914 receiving yards.
- 1990 Michigan Wolverines football team – Under head coach Gary Moeller, the Wolverines compiled a 9–3 record, tied for the Big Ten Conferencechampionship, defeated Ole Miss in the 1991 Gator Bowl, and were ranked No. 7 in the final AP poll. The team's statistical leaders included Elvis Grbac with 1,911 passing yards, Jon Vaughn with 1,364 rushing yards, Desmond Howard with 1,025 receiving yards, and J. D. Carlson with 95 points scored.
- 1990 Michigan State Spartans football team – Under head coach George Perles, the Spartans compiled an 8–3–1 record, defeated USC in the John Hancock Bowl, and were ranked No. 16 in the final AP poll. The team's statistical leaders included Dan Enos with 1,677 passing yards, Tico Duckett with 1,394 rushing yards, James Bradley with 517 receiving yards, and Hyland Hickson with 90 points scored.

=== Basketball ===
- 1989–90 Detroit Pistons season – Under head coach Chuck Daly, the Pistons compiled a 59–23 record, finished first in the NBA's Central Division, and defeated the Portland Trail Blazers in the 1990 NBA Finals. The team's statistical leaders included Isaiah Thomas with 1,492 points and 764 assists and Dennis Rodman with 792 rebounds.

=== Ice hockey ===
- 1989–90 Detroit Red Wings season – Under head coach Jacques Demers, the Red Wings compiled a 28–38–14 record and finished fifth in the NHL Norris Division. Steve Yzerman led the team with 62 goals, 65 assists, and 127 points. The team's goaltenders included Glen Hanlon (45 games) and Tim Cheveldae (28 games).

== Music and culture ==
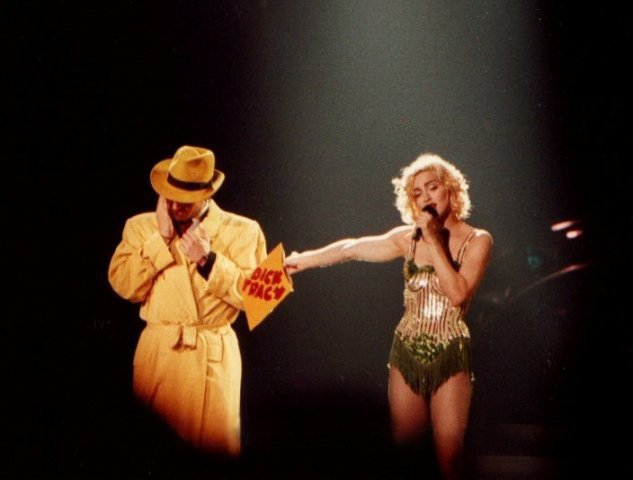
Madonna performing with a Dick Tracy lookalike during the Blond Ambition World Tour, 1990

- January 18 - Estonian conductor Neeme Järvi was hired as the 11th music director of the Detroit Symphony Orchestra. He remained in that position until 2005.
- March 27 - Madonna's single Vogue was released. It reached No. 1 on the Billboard Hot 100 and was No. 5 on the year-end chart.
- April to August - Madonna conducted her Blond Ambition World Tour. Rolling Stone called it an "elaborately choreographed, sexually provocative extravaganza" and proclaimed it "the best tour of 1990". The tour generated strong negative reaction from religious groups for her performance of "Like a Virgin", during which two male dancers caressed her body before she simulated masturbation. The tour was later the subject of the documentary film, Madonna: Truth or Dare.
- June 15 - The film Dick Tracy was released featuring Madonna as Breathless Mahoney.
- October 30 - Madonna's single Justify My Love was released. It reached No. 1 on the Billboard Hot 100.

== Chronology of events ==
=== June ===
- June 3 - Dr. Jack Kevorkian, a retired pathologist living in Royal Oak, assisted Janet Adkins, a 54-year-old Alzheimer's patient from Oregon, to end her life using his homemade suicide machine. On December 3, 1990, Kevorkian was charged with murder for his role in Adkins' death. The charges were dismissed 10 days later when an Oakland County judge ruled that the legal status of assisted suicide was unclear.

=== September ===
- September 18 - The M. V. Jupiter, a 393-foot tanker carrying a million gallons of gasoline, exploded and burned at a dock on the Saginaw River in Bay City. One crewman was killed.

=== November ===
- November 6 - State Senator John Engler upset incumbent Governor James Blanchard in the closest gubernatorial election in Michigan history. Engler received 1,279,745 votes, and Blanchard received 1,260,611 votes. A poll by The Detroit News, released two days before the election, showed Blanchard with 54% to 40% for Engler.

=== December ===
- December 3 - 1990 Wayne County Airport runway collision: Two Northwest Airlines planes collided on the ground in dense fog. Eight persons were killed.

== Births ==
- March 4 - Draymond Green, basketball forward, and NBA Defensive Player of the Year (2017), in Saginaw, Michigan
- April 11 - Amanda Chidester, softball player and 2x Big Ten Conference Player of the Year, in Allen Park, Michigan
- September 22 - Denard Robinson, Big Ten Offensive Player of the Year in 2010, in Deerfield Beach, Florida

=== Gallery of 1990 births ===
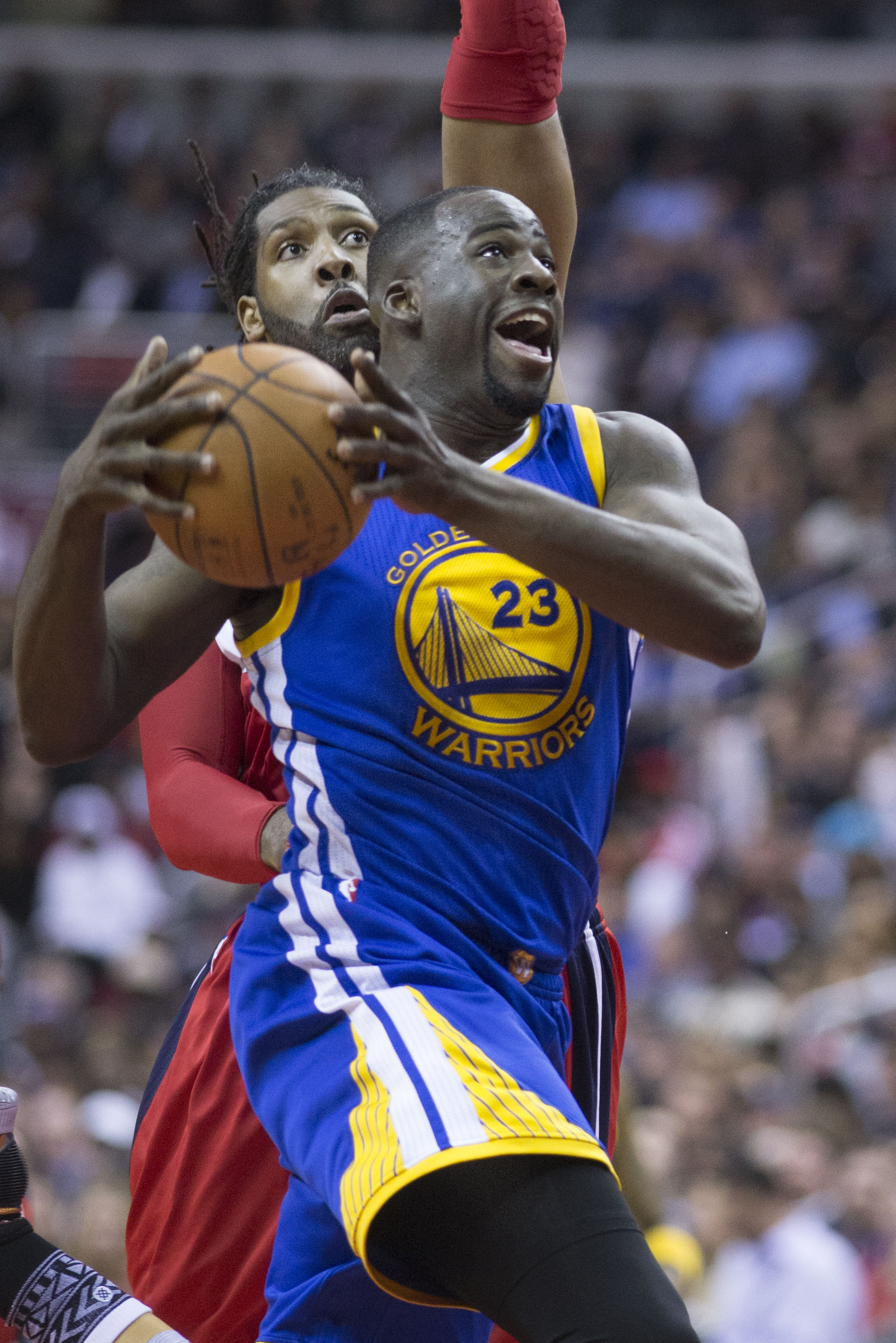
Draymond Green

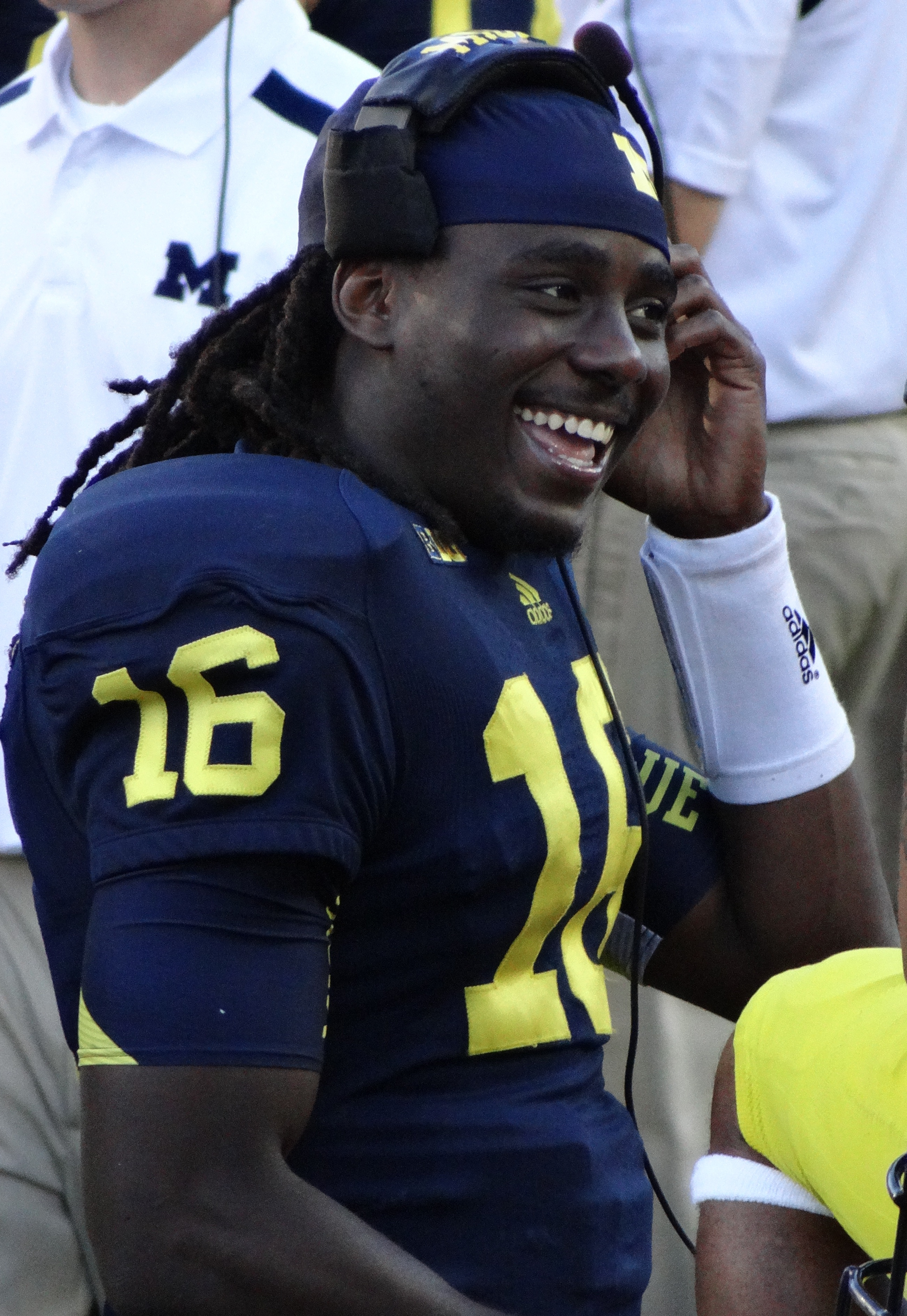
Denard Robinson

== Deaths ==
- February 9 - Del Shannon, Grand Rapids native and singer-songwriter, best known for his 1961 number 1 Billboard hit "Runaway", at age 55 in Santa Clarita, California
- March 15 - Tom Harmon, 1940 Heisman Trophy winner at the University of Michigan, at age 70 in Los Angeles
- April 7 - Dick Lundy, Sault Ste. Marie native and animator who co-created Donald Duck, at age 82 in San Diego
- October 25 - Bennie Oosterbaan, multi-sport star and later coach at the University of Michigan, at age 84 in Ann Arbor, Michigan

=== Gallery of 1990 deaths ===
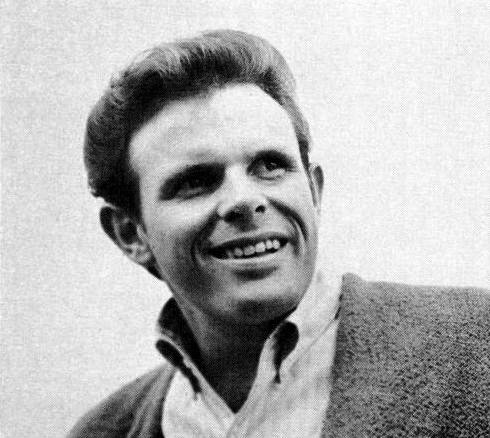
Del Shannon

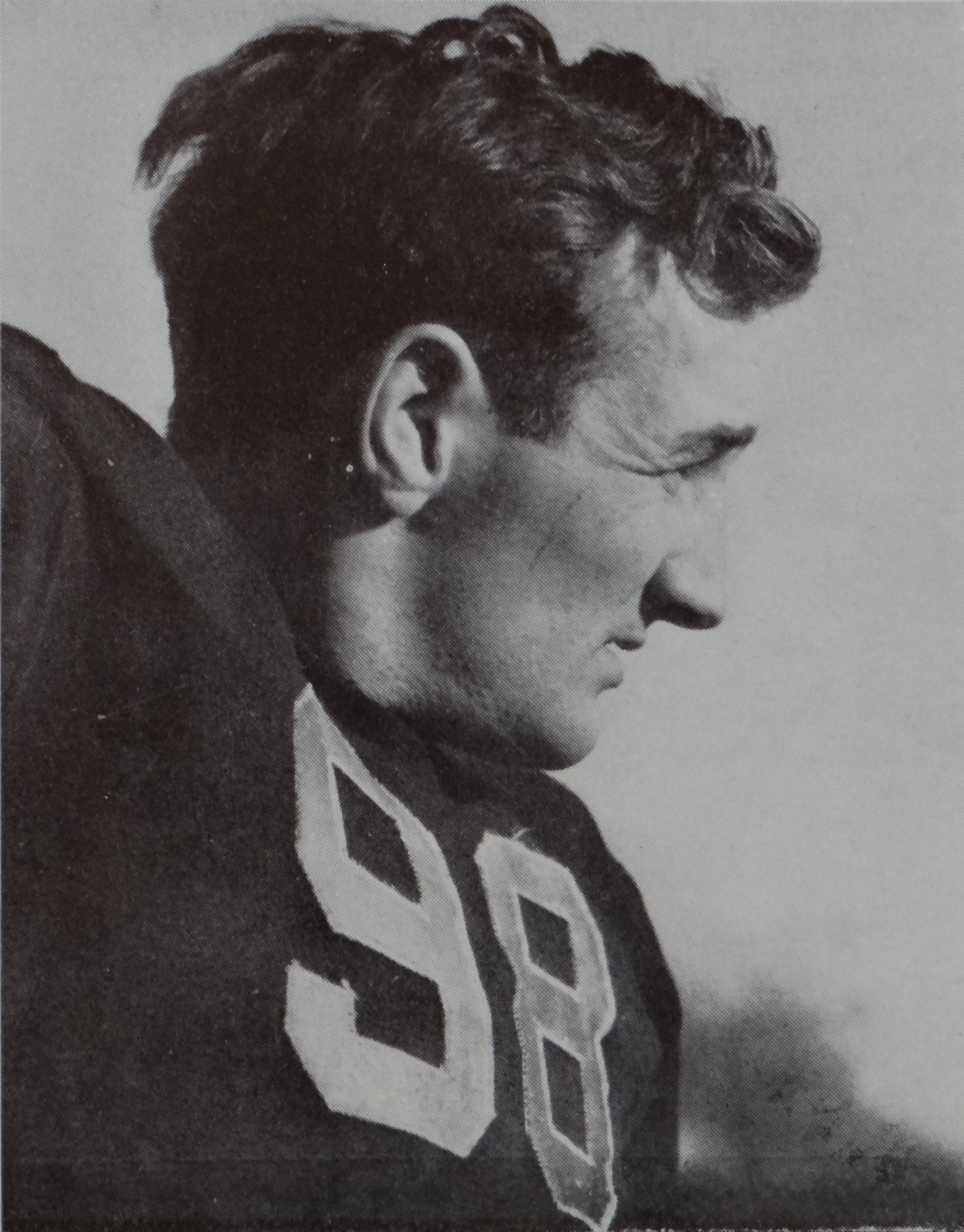
Tom Harmon

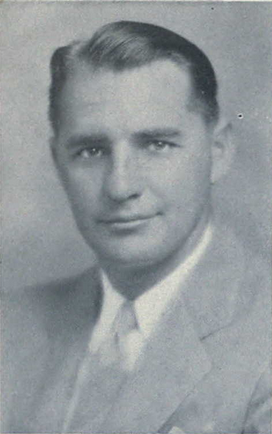
Bennie Oosterbaan

== See also ==
- History of Michigan
- History of Detroit
