= Robert J. Huber =

American politician (1922–2001)

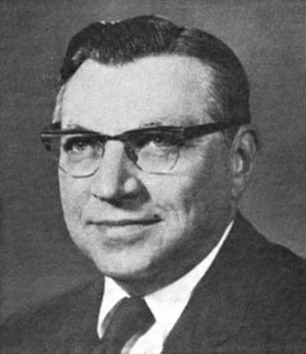

Member of the U.S. House of Representatives from Michigan's 18th district
- In office January 3, 1973 – January 3, 1975
- Preceded by: William Broomfield
- Succeeded by: James Blanchard

Member of the Michigan Senate from the 16th district
- In office 1965–1970
- Preceded by: Milton Zaagman
- Succeeded by: Donald E. Bishop

Personal details
- Born: Robert James Huber; August 29, 1922 Detroit, Michigan
- Died: April 23, 2001 (aged 78) Troy, Michigan
- Resting place: Memory Gardens Cemetery in Hope, Arkansas
- Party: Republican
- Spouse: Mary Pauline "Polly" Tolleson (1952–2001)
- Children: no children
- Education: University of Detroit; Culver Military Academy; Yale University
- Occupation: businessman

Military service
- Branch/service: United States Army
- Battles/wars: World War II

Robert James Huber (August 29, 1922 - April 23, 2001) was a politician from the U.S. state of Michigan.

Huber was born in Detroit, Michigan, where he attended the public schools. He attended the University of Detroit 1935–1937, and graduated from Culver Military Academy, 1939. He received a B.S. from the Sheffield Scientific School of Yale University in New Haven, Connecticut in 1943. He served in the United States Army, 1943–1946. Huber worked as a banker and businessman, and was mayor of Troy, Michigan, 1959–1964. He served on the board of supervisors of Oakland County, Michigan. 1959–1963. He was a member of the Michigan Senate from the 16th district from 1965 to 1970.

Huber was elected as a Republican from Michigan's 18th congressional district to the 93rd United States Congress, serving from January 3, 1973, to January 3, 1975. He was an unsuccessful candidate for reelection in 1974, losing to future Democratic Governor of Michigan James Blanchard. He ran unsuccessfully for nomination to the United States Senate from Michigan in 1970, 1976, 1982, and 1988. He was chairman of the board, Michigan Chrome and Chemical Co.

Huber died in Troy, Michigan, and was interred in Memory Gardens Cemetery, in Hope, Arkansas.

Political offices
Preceded by William Broomfield	United States Representative for the 18th Congressional District of Michigan; 1973 – 1975	Succeeded by James Blanchard
