= Lawrence D. Crawford =

American politician

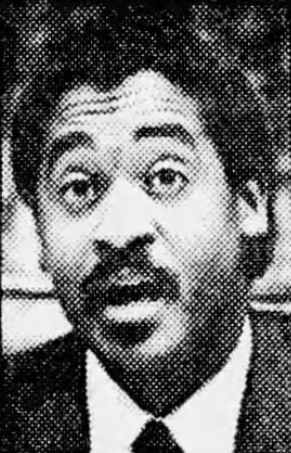

Mayor of Saginaw, Michigan
- In office November 14, 1983 – November 9, 1987
- Preceded by: Ronald M. Bushey
- Succeeded by: Delbert J. Schrems

City Council of Saginaw, Michigan
- In office 1981–1988

Personal details
- Born: Lawrence D. Crawford Saginaw, Michigan
- Party: Democratic
- Spouse: Winnie Crawford
- Children: 2
- Education: B.S. and D.D.S. University of Michigan
- Occupation: Dentist

Lawrence D. Crawford is an American politician who served as the third African-American mayor of Saginaw, Michigan.

== Biography ==
Crawford was born and raised in Saginaw, Michigan and attended the University of Michigan where he received a B.S. and a dental degree.

In the early 1980s, Saginaw was beset by problems. General Motors, the city's main employer, was facing financial difficulties; Black and Latino residents began to flee for the suburbs as the white and professional population had done in the past undermining the tax base; and the police slaying of Oliver Bruce Moorer motivated the Black population to vote and the city elected its first black majorities to the City Council and to the school board. Blacks were 35% of the population at the time. In 1981, he was elected to the City Council. In November 1983, Crawford was named by the City Council as Mayor of Saginaw (Saginaw has a weak mayor form of government where the mayor is elected by the City Commission). He was re-elected in 1984. Given the racial tension in the city, Crawford sought to ease the fears of the white population through outreach efforts such as expanding block grants and improving infrastructure on the mostly white west side of town. The results were mixed as it was difficult to balance the needs of the Black and White populations while the city was in economic distress. He also made significant efforts in increasing the diversity of the city's workforce and vendors. In May 1985, he created the Youth Task Force to seek long-term solutions to the gang problem. In 1986, the city signed a lease agreement to operate the Downtown Shopping Mall and convert it into a conference and visitor center; the investment was unsuccessful and cost the city $3 million. He was succeeded by Delbert J. Schrems who was named by the City Council after winning election with the campaign slogan "Balance the Power". Crawford served on the City Council until his resignation on August 8, 1988; his council seat was filled by Gary L. Loster who would later serve as mayor (1993–2001).

Crawford co-founded VITEC-USA, a $150 million in sales supplier of plastic fuel tanks and systems to the automotive industry, the first manufacturing business located in the Detroit Empowerment Zone. He is the chairman and CEO of Diversity-Vuteq, LLC, a joint venture with Japanese auto parts supplier Vuteq that produces parts for Toyota plants in the US.

He was appointed by the president to the National Advisory Board of the Small Business Administration; and was appointed to the Michigan Supreme Court Task Force on Gender and Racial Equity in the Courts.

== Personal life ==
Crawford is married to Winnie Crawford; they have two sons: Alan and Larry Jr. He attends the Welcome Missionary Baptist Church in Pontiac, Michigan. He is a brother in the Alpha Phi Alpha fraternity and a member of Sigma Pi Phi.
