= J. Bob Traxler =

American politician and lawyer (1931–2019)

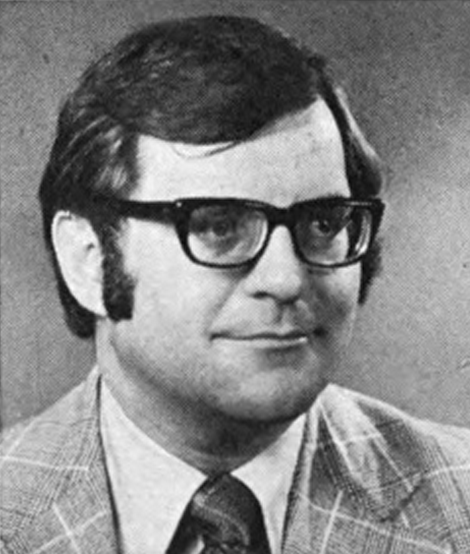

Member of the U.S. House of Representatives from Michigan's 8th district
- In office April 23, 1974 – January 3, 1993
- Preceded by: James Harvey
- Succeeded by: James A. Barcia

Member of the Michigan House of Representatives
- In office January 1, 1963 – 1974
- Preceded by: Lester O. Begick
- Succeeded by: Colleen House
- Constituency: Bay County district (1963–1964); 101st district (1965–1974)

Personal details
- Born: Jerome Bob Traxler; July 21, 1931 Kawkawlin, Michigan
- Died: October 30, 2019 (aged 88) Bay City, Michigan, U.S.
- Party: Democratic
- Education: Michigan State University
- Occupation: Lawyer

Jerome Bob Traxler (July 21, 1931 – October 30, 2019), also known as J. Bob Traxler or Bob Traxler, was an American lawyer and politician from Michigan. He served ten terms in the United States House of Representatives from 1974 to 1993.

== Early life and career ==
Traxler was born in Kawkawlin, Michigan, and attended the public schools in Bay City, including T.L. Handy High School. He received a B.A. from Michigan State College (now Michigan State University) in 1953 and an LL.B. from Detroit College of Law in 1959. He was admitted to the Michigan bar in 1960 and commenced practice in Bay City. While a student at Michigan State, he became a member of Kappa Sigma fraternity.

He served in the United States Army from 1953 to 1955. Afterwards, he served as assistant Bay County prosecutor, 1960–1962.

== Political career ==
He was a member of the Michigan House of Representatives from 1962 to 1974. In the legislature, he was majority floor leader in the Michigan house from 1965 to 1966.

He served on the Michigan State University Board of Trustees from 1993 to 2000. He also served on the Mackinac Island State Park Commission from 1992 to 2005.

== Congress ==
Following the resignation of Republican James Harvey on January 31, 1974, Traxler ran in the subsequent special election. He was elected as a Democrat on April 16, 1974, to fill the vacancy to the 93rd United States Congress in Michigan's 8th congressional district. He was subsequently re-elected to the nine succeeding Congresses, serving from April 23, 1974, until his retirement from Congress on January 3, 1993.

Due to congressional redistricting following the 1990 census, the area represented by Traxler mostly became the 5th district. James A. Barcia was elected to succeed Traxler for the 103rd Congress in the re-drawn 5th congressional district.

== Private life ==
Traxler was a resident of Saginaw, Michigan. He had at least one daughter, Sarah, with Mary Richards. He married Jean B. Hose on January 1, 2006.

Traxler died on October 30, 2019.

U.S. House of Representatives
Preceded by James Harvey	Member of the U.S. House of Representatives from Michigan's 8th congressional district 1974–1993	Succeeded by James A. Barcia
