= William Broomfield =

American politician (1922–2019)

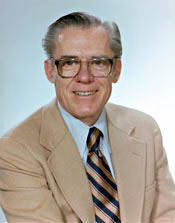

Member of the U.S. House of Representatives from Michigan
- In office January 3, 1957 – January 3, 1993
- Preceded by: George A. Dondero
- Succeeded by: Joe Knollenberg (redistricting)
- Constituency: 18th district (1957-1973); 19th district (1973-1983); 18th district (1983-1993)

Member of the Michigan Senate from the 12th district
- In office 1955–1956
- Preceded by: George N. Higgins
- Succeeded by: L. Harvey Lodge

Member of the Michigan House of Representatives from the 5th Oakland district
- In office 1949–1954
- Preceded by: George Mathieson
- Succeeded by: Theodore F. Hughes

Personal details
- Born: April 28, 1922 Royal Oak, Michigan, U.S.
- Died: February 20, 2019 (aged 96) Kensington, Maryland, U.S.
- Party: Republican
- Spouse: Jane Smith Thompson (m. 1951; died 2013)
- Profession: Real Estate, Politician
- William Broomfield's voice Broomfield discusses the need for funding foreign aid to the Contras; Recorded April 15, 1986

William S. Broomfield, (April 28, 1922 – February 20, 2019) was an American politician from the U.S. state of Michigan.

== Early life ==
Broomfield, the son of Scevillian C. and Fern Broomfield was born in Royal Oak, Michigan. His father was a dentist. He graduated from Royal Oak High School in 1940 and attended Michigan State College (now Michigan State University) at East Lansing. During World War II, he served in the United States Army Air Corps. After the war, he engaged in the real-estate and property-management business.

== Political career ==
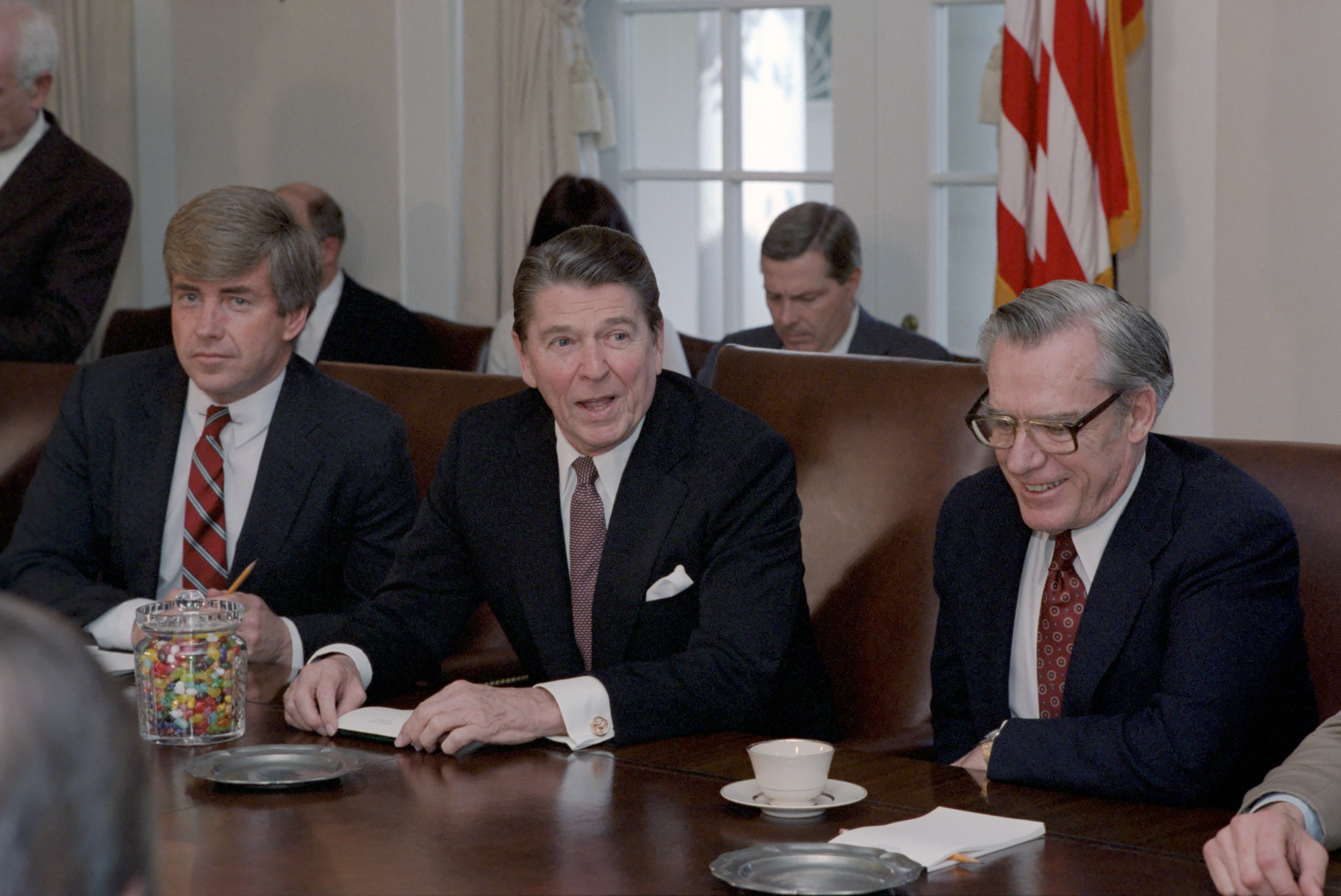
Broomfield and Jack Kemp discuss the budget of the United States with President Ronald Reagan in 1983

Broomfield was a member of the Michigan State House of Representatives, 1949–1954, serving as speaker pro tempore in 1953. He served in the Michigan State Senate in 1955 and 1956.

In 1956, Broomfield was elected as a Republican from Michigan's 18th District to the United States House of Representatives for the 85th and to the seventeen succeeding Congresses, serving from January 3, 1957, to January 3, 1993. Due to redistricting following U.S. Censuses, Broomfield served the 19th District, 1973–1983 and the 18th District, 1983–1993. He was not a candidate for renomination in 1992 to the 103rd Congress. The 18th District was discontinued following the 1990 census and for the most part redistricted as the 11th which elected Joe Knollenberg in 1993.

During his tenure in Congress, Broomfield served as a member of the U.S. House Committee on Foreign Affairs and was ranking member from 1975 until his retirement in 1993. At the time of his retirement, he was the longest serving Republican then serving in the House of Representatives. During his years of service in the House, Broomfield garnered praise from both sides of the aisle for his ethics, honesty and statesmanship. When he retired, he left behind a legacy of bipartisan friendship and cooperation.

Broomfield voted in favor of the Civil Rights Acts of 1957, 1960, 1964, and 1968, as well as the 24th Amendment to the U.S. Constitution and the Voting Rights Act of 1965.

== Retirement ==
After retirement in 1993, Broomfield started a foundation that supports various charities in southeast Michigan, including the efforts to cure cancer, spina bifida and Alzheimer's, and the Salvation Army. A longtime resident of Lake Orion, Michigan, he last lived in Kensington, Maryland.

In September 2000, Congress designated the Royal Oak Post Office at 200 West 2nd Street in Royal Oak, Michigan, as the William S. Broomfield Post Office Building.

On December 30, 2006, Broomfield collapsed at the state funeral memorial for former U.S. President Gerald Ford at the United States Capitol, bringing the ceremonies to a temporary pause. The reason given for the collapse was exhaustion.

Broomfield's wife Jane died on March 21, 2013, at the age of 97, due to heart failure. Broomfield died on February 20, 2019, at the age of 96 in Kensington, Maryland, where he resided in his later years.

U.S. House of Representatives
Preceded by George Anthony Dondero	Member of the U.S. House of Representatives from Michigan's 18th congressional district 1957–1973	Succeeded by Robert J. Huber
Preceded by Jack H. McDonald	Member of the U.S. House of Representatives from Michigan's 19th congressional district 1973–1983	Constituency abolished
Preceded by James J. Blanchard	Member of the U.S. House of Representatives from Michigan's 18th congressional district 1983–1993	Constituency abolished
Preceded by John N. Erlenborn	Ranking Member of the House Foreign Affairs Committee; 1975–1993	Succeeded by Benjamin Gilman
Honorary titles
Preceded by John Dingell	Most Senior Living U.S. representative Sitting or Former; 2019; Served alongside: Merwin Coad, Hal Haskell	Succeeded by Merwin Coad; Hal Haskell
