= Michigan's 18th congressional district =

Obsolete U.S. House district

Coordinates: 42°35′N 83°20′W

- Obsolete district
- Created: 1950
- Eliminated: 1990
- Years active: 1953-1993

Michigan's 18th congressional district is an obsolete United States congressional district in Michigan. The first Representative to Congress elected from the 18th district, George Anthony Dondero, took office in 1953, after reapportionment due to the 1950 census. In 1933, Dondero had previously been the first representative elected from 17th district.

From 1982 until its demise the 18th district included parts of three counties. It included Brighton, Brighton Township and Green Oak Township in Livingston County, Michigan, Lyon Township, South Lyon, New Hudson, Milford, Milford Township, Wixom, Walled Lake, Wolverine Lake, Commerce Township, Novi, the Oakland county portion of Northville, Farmington, Farmington Hills, West Bloomfield Township, Orchard Lake, Keego Harbor, Sylvan Lake, Bloomfield Township, Franklin, Bingham Farms, Beverly Hills, Bloomfield Hills, Birmingham, Troy (except the southeast corner of Troy, south of Big Beaver and east of Rochester Road), Auburn Hills, Rochester Hills, Rochester, Orion Township, Lake Orion, Lake Angelus, Oakland Township and Addison Township in Oakland County. It also included Romeo, Washington Township, Shelby Township and Bruce Township in Macomb County.

== List of members representing the district ==
Member	Party	Years	Cong ress	Electoral history
District created January 3, 1953
George Anthony Dondero (Royal Oak)	Republican	January 3, 1953 – January 3, 1957	83rd 84th	Redistricted from the 17th district and re-elected in 1952. Re-elected in 1954. Retired.
William Broomfield (Royal Oak)	Republican	January 3, 1957 – January 3, 1973	85th 86th 87th 88th 89th 90th 91st 92nd	Elected in 1956. Re-elected in 1958. Re-elected in 1960. Re-elected in 1962. Re-elected in 1964. Re-elected in 1966. Re-elected in 1968. Re-elected in 1970. Redistricted to the 19th district.
Robert J. Huber (Troy)	Republican	January 3, 1973 – January 3, 1975	93rd	Elected in 1972. Lost re-election.
James Blanchard (Pleasant Ridge)	Democratic	January 3, 1975 – January 1, 1983	94th 95th 96th 97th	Elected in 1974. Re-elected in 1976. Re-elected in 1978. Re-elected in 1980. Retired to run for Governor of Michigan and resigned to take office.
William Broomfield (Birmingham)	Republican	January 3, 1983 – January 3, 1993	98th 99th 100th 101st 102nd	Redistricted from the 19th district and re-elected in 1982. Re-elected in 1984. Re-elected in 1986. Re-elected in 1988. Re-elected in 1990. Retired.
District eliminated January 3, 1993
