= Carl Pursell =

American politician (1932–2009)

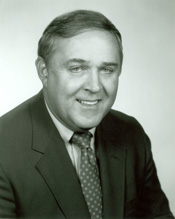

Member of the U.S. House of Representatives from Michigan's 2nd district
- In office January 3, 1977 – January 3, 1993
- Preceded by: Marvin L. Esch
- Succeeded by: Pete Hoekstra

Member of the Michigan Senate from the 14th district
- In office January 1971 – January 1977
- Preceded by: George Kuhn
- Succeeded by: Robert Geake

Personal details
- Born: Carl Duane Pursell; December 19, 1932 Imlay City, Michigan, U.S.
- Died: June 11, 2009 (aged 76) Plymouth, Michigan, U.S.
- Party: Republican
- Spouse: Peggy
- Children: 3
- Education: Eastern Michigan University (BA, MA)

Carl Duane Pursell (December 19, 1932 – June 11, 2009) was an American politician who served as the U.S. representative for Michigan's 2nd congressional district from 1977 to 1993. He was a member of the Republican Party.

== Biography ==
He was born in Imlay City, Michigan and graduated from Plymouth High School, Plymouth, Michigan, in 1951. He worked in his father's business and served in the United States Army from 1957 to 1959. In 1957 and 1961, he earned degrees from Eastern Michigan University, where he was also a member of the Tau Kappa Epsilon fraternity. He received an alumnus achievement award in 1974 and a distinguished alumnus award in 1990.

In 1969, Pursell ran successfully for a seat as Wayne County Commissioner. He left this position in 1971, after being elected from the 14th district to the Michigan Senate, serving from 1971 to 1977. Pursell was elected as a Republican from Michigan's 2nd congressional district to the United States House of Representatives. He served in the 95th Congress and to the seven succeeding Congresses, serving from January 3, 1977, until his retiring from Congress on January 3, 1993. A moderate, he served as ranking member of the Appropriations Subcommittee on Education.

Pursell served as regent of Eastern Michigan University from 1993 to 1999. He died at his home at the age of 76.

U.S. House of Representatives
Preceded by Marvin L. Esch	Member of the U.S. House of Representatives from Michigan's 2nd congressional district 1977–1993	Succeeded by Pete Hoekstra
Party political offices
New office	Chair of the Gypsy Moths; 1981–1983; Served alongside: Bill Green	Position abolished
