= James Blanchard =

American politician (born 1942)

Jim Blanchard
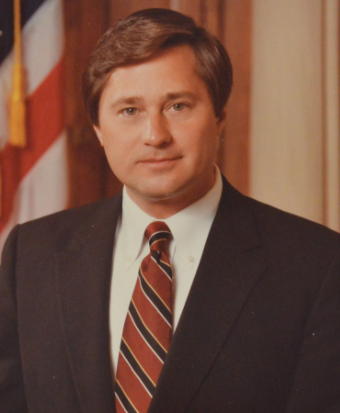

25th United States Ambassador to Canada
- In office August 19, 1993 – March 29, 1996
- President: Bill Clinton
- Preceded by: Peter Teeley
- Succeeded by: Gordon Giffin

45th Governor of Michigan
- In office January 1, 1983 – January 1, 1991
- Lieutenant: Martha Griffiths
- Preceded by: William Milliken
- Succeeded by: John Engler

Member of the U.S. House of Representatives from Michigan's 18th district
- In office January 3, 1975 – January 1, 1983
- Preceded by: Robert J. Huber
- Succeeded by: William Broomfield

Personal details
- Born: James Johnston Blanchard; August 8, 1942 (age 84) Detroit, Michigan, U.S.
- Party: Democratic
- Spouse(s): Paula Blanchard (div. 1987) Janet Blanchard
- Education: Michigan State University (BA, MBA); University of Minnesota (JD)

James Johnston Blanchard (born August 8, 1942) is an American attorney, diplomat, and politician who served as the 45th governor of Michigan from 1983 to 1991. A member of the Democratic Party, Blanchard previously served in the United States House of Representatives from 1975 to 1983, and later as the United States Ambassador to Canada from 1993 to 1996.

== Early life and education ==
Blanchard was born in Detroit, Michigan, on August 8, 1942. He grew up and attended Lincoln High School in Ferndale, Michigan. He received a Bachelor of Arts from Michigan State University in 1964 and an MBA in 1965. Blanchard received a Juris Doctor from the University of Minnesota Law School in 1968 and was admitted to the State Bar of Michigan soon after. He currently lives in Pleasant Ridge, Michigan.

== Career ==
Blanchard commenced practice as an attorney in Lansing and served as legal advisor to the Michigan Secretary of State in 1968 and 1969. He was Assistant Attorney General of Michigan, from 1969 to 1974, administrative assistant to the attorney general from 1970 to 1971, and assistant deputy attorney general from 1971 to 1972. In 1974 he joined the law firm of Beer and Boltz, in Bloomfield Hills, Michigan.

=== U.S. Representative ===
Blanchard was elected as a Democrat to the United States House of Representatives from Michigan's 18th District for the 94th United States Congress and to the three succeeding Congresses, serving from January 3, 1975 to January 1, 1983. During that time, he was responsible for legislation providing federal loan guarantees for Chrysler Corporation that saved the company from a likely bankruptcy.

=== Governor of Michigan ===
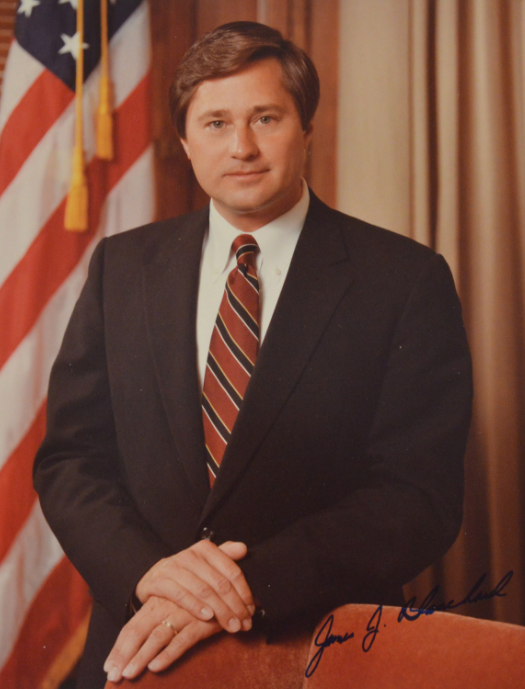
Blanchard as governor.

Blanchard opted not to run for re-election to the U.S. House in 1982 and was elected Governor of Michigan, defeating Republican Richard Headlee, a Farmington Hills insurance company executive. Blanchard served two terms as governor (1983–1991) until his defeat by Republican state senator John Engler in 1990. Blanchard was the first Democratic governor to serve in 20 years since John Swainson, who left office in 1963.

On January 1, 1983, he took over what was described as "the toughest governor's job in America." His state faced a $1.7 billion deficit, the threat of bankruptcy, record high unemployment of more than 17 percent and the worst credit rating in America. Working with leaders of business, labor, education and local government, the governor put together a strategy for Michigan's future and raised income taxes and fees necessary to keep it on track. Blanchard completed his work as Michigan's 45th governor having balanced eight consecutive state budgets, improving the state's credit rating, established a $422 million "rainy-day fund," and producing a solvency dividend of more than $1 billion in savings from reduced borrowing costs.

In 1986, Governor Blanchard proposed America’s first statewide prepaid college-tuition program to help Michigan families pay for higher education, which inspired other states (including Florida and Ohio) to propose similar plans, now commonly known as 529 programs.

Newsweek credited Governor Blanchard with leading "one of the most dramatic economic turnabouts in the recent history of state government," and national publications such as U.S. News & World Report listed him among the best governors in America, one of the innovators and energizers who made things work in an era of declining federal aid. However, in 1990 Blanchard lost his campaign for a third term to State Senator John Engler.

=== Later career ===
After losing the gubernatorial election to John Engler in 1990, Blanchard became a partner in the Washington law firm of Verner, Liipfert, Bernhard, McPherson and Hand. He also chaired Bill Clinton's successful campaign for president in Michigan in 1992.

President Clinton appointed Blanchard United States Ambassador to Canada, a position he held from 1993 to 1996. In 2002, Blanchard again ran for governor but lost his primary bid to State Attorney General Jennifer Granholm. As of 2004, he was a partner in the Washington D.C. law firm of DLA Piper U.S. and resided in Beverly Hills, Michigan. He served as Chairman of Meridian International Center and on the Advisory Board of the Institute for Law and Politics at the University of Minnesota Law School and was President of the Foundation for the National Archives. Blanchard also co-chaired the Canada-United States Law Institute.

Blanchard served on the board of Canadian pipeline corporation Enbridge for over 10 years and advised them following the 2010 Kalamazoo River oil spill. He also served as a member of the "Debt Reduction Task Force" at the Bipartisan Policy Center. and was a board member of Nortel and Chrysler Group LLC (2009–2012).

Blanchard is a member of the ReFormers Caucus of Issue One.

U.S. House of Representatives
Preceded by Robert J. Huber	Member of the U.S. House of Representatives from Michigan's 18th congressional district 1975–1983	Succeeded by William Broomfield
Party political offices
Preceded by William Fitzgerald	Democratic nominee for Governor of Michigan; 1982, 1986, 1990	Succeeded by Howard Wolpe
Preceded by Bill Clinton	Chair of the Democratic Governors Association; 1988–1989	Succeeded by Dick Celeste
Political offices
Preceded by William Milliken	Governor of Michigan; 1983–1991	Succeeded by John Engler
Diplomatic posts
Preceded by Peter Teeley	United States Ambassador to Canada; 1993–1996	Succeeded by Gordon Giffin
U.S. order of precedence (ceremonial)
Preceded by Martha McSally as Former U.S. Senator	Order of precedence of the United States; Within Michigan	Succeeded by John Engler as Former Governor
Preceded by Asa Hutchinson as Former Governor	Order of precedence of the United States; Outside Michigan	Succeeded by John Engler as Former Governor
