= 1955 in Michigan =

- Decades: 1930s; 1940s; 1950s; 1960s; 1970s
- See also: History of Michigan; Historical outline of Michigan; List of years in Michigan; 1955 in the United States

Events from the year 1955 in Michigan

== Top stories ==
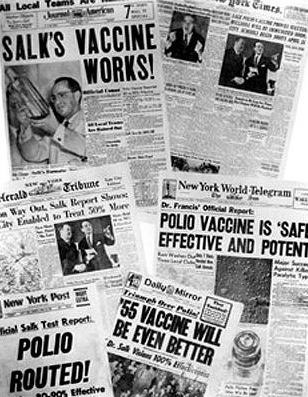
Newspaper headlines announcing Salk vaccine approval

The Associated Press (AP) and United Press (UP) each selected Michigan's top news stories of 1955 as follows:

- The modified guaranteed annual wage (GAW) agreements between the United Auto Workers (UAW) and the major American automobile manufacturers. The historic agreements provided a modified GAW obligation on the part of the auto makers to pay workers supplementary payments on top of unemployment benefits for 26 weeks in the event of a layoff. (AP-1, UP-1)
- The unsolved sex slayings of Barbara Gaca (age 7, body discovered near Pontiac, March 31), Jeannie Singleton (age 8, body found north of Kalamazoo, June 1), and Peter Gorham (age 12, body found north of Muskegon, August 14). (AP-3, UP-2)
- The announcement at a press conference in Ann Arbor on April 12 that the Salk polio vaccine had been approved as safe and effective. (AP-2, UP-4)
- Record production totals in the automobile industry. The industry produced a record 7,942,893 passengers cars in 1955, an increase of more than a million cars over 1954 production levels. Truck production was 1,247,799. The breakdown among manufacturers was 4,649,279 for General Motors (1,830,037 for Chevrolet), 2,614,599 for Ford Motor, and 1,457,453 million for Chrysler. In addition, the payroll of the Big Three auto makers (General Motors, Ford Motor, and Chrysler) exceeded five billion dollars paid to 982,183 salaried and hourly workers. (AP-6 [tie], UP-5)
- The April 4 election in which Democrats dominated state offices. (AP-4, UP-10)
- A 46-day newspaper strike that ran from December 1, 1955, until January 17, 1956, that halted publication of The Detroit News, Detroit Free Press, and Detroit Times. (AP-11 [tie], UP-7 [tie])
- The Michigan Legislature's adoption in November 1955 of a 65-mile per hour daytime speed limit. (UP-3)
- The legislative deadlock over funding for hospital beds for child mental patients. The deadlock was broken on December 14 when the Michigan Legislature passed legislation providing for 1,450 additional beds to be available within four months and 2,500 more beds in a new hospital to be built in southeastern Michigan. (AP-5)
- Competition between Cadillac and Kalkaska over the site for a jet base in northern Michigan. (UP-6)
- The 1955 Michigan State Spartans football team winning a bid to the Rose Bowl. (AP-6 [tie])
- The Michigan Legislature's adoption of a highway program. (UP-7)
- Record heat and water shortages in many Michigan communities during the summer. (AP-8)
- Ford Motor Co.'s decision to list its stock for public sale. (AP-9)
- Construction of the Mackinac Bridge. By October 1955, 600 skilled men were working on the bridge, which was half completed with the gigantic main towers and concrete cable anchorages in place. (UP-9)

The United Press and The Detroit Reporter (strike newspaper) each selected the year's top sports stories as follows:

- After a losing season in 1954, the 1955 Michigan State Spartans football team bounced back with a 9-1 record and was ranked No. 2 in the final AP and UP polls. (UP-1)
- The 1954–55 Detroit Red Wings' comeback to win the Stanley Cup in seven games over the Montreal Canadiens (DR-1)
- Al Kaline at age 20 became the youngest batting champion in major league history with a .340 batting average. (UP-2, DR-2)
- The Detroit Lions collapse from first place in 1954 to last place in 1955. (UP-3; DR-3)
- The hockey riot in Montreal on March 17, resulting in the forfeiture of a game to the Detroit Red Wings. (UP-4)
- Joe Schoenith's victory in the Gale V to bring the American Power Boat Association's Gold Cup back to Detroit (DR-4)
- The collapse of the 1955 Michigan Wolverines football team, ranked No. 1 in the country in late October and then losing two of their last three games, including a 17-0 loss to Ohio State. (UP-5)
- Anita Cantaline's victory in the U.S. Women's Open bowling championship (DR-5)

== Office holders ==
=== State office holders ===
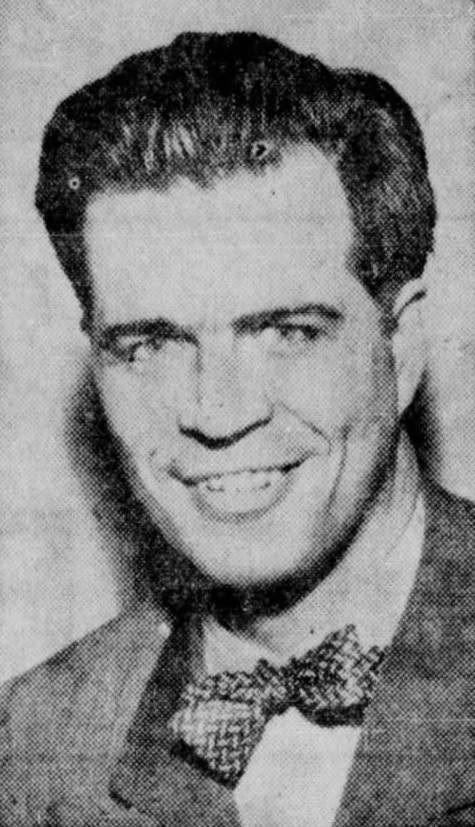
Gov. G. Mennen Williams

- Governor of Michigan: G. Mennen Williams (Democrat)
- Lieutenant Governor of Michigan: Philip Hart (Democrat)
- Michigan Attorney General: Thomas M. Kavanagh (Democrat)
- Michigan Secretary of State: James M. Hare (Democrat)
- Speaker of the Michigan House of Representatives: Wade Van Valkenburg (Republican)
- Chief Justice, Michigan Supreme Court: Leland W. Carr

=== Mayors of major cities ===
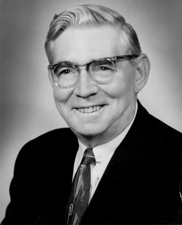
Patrick V. McNamara

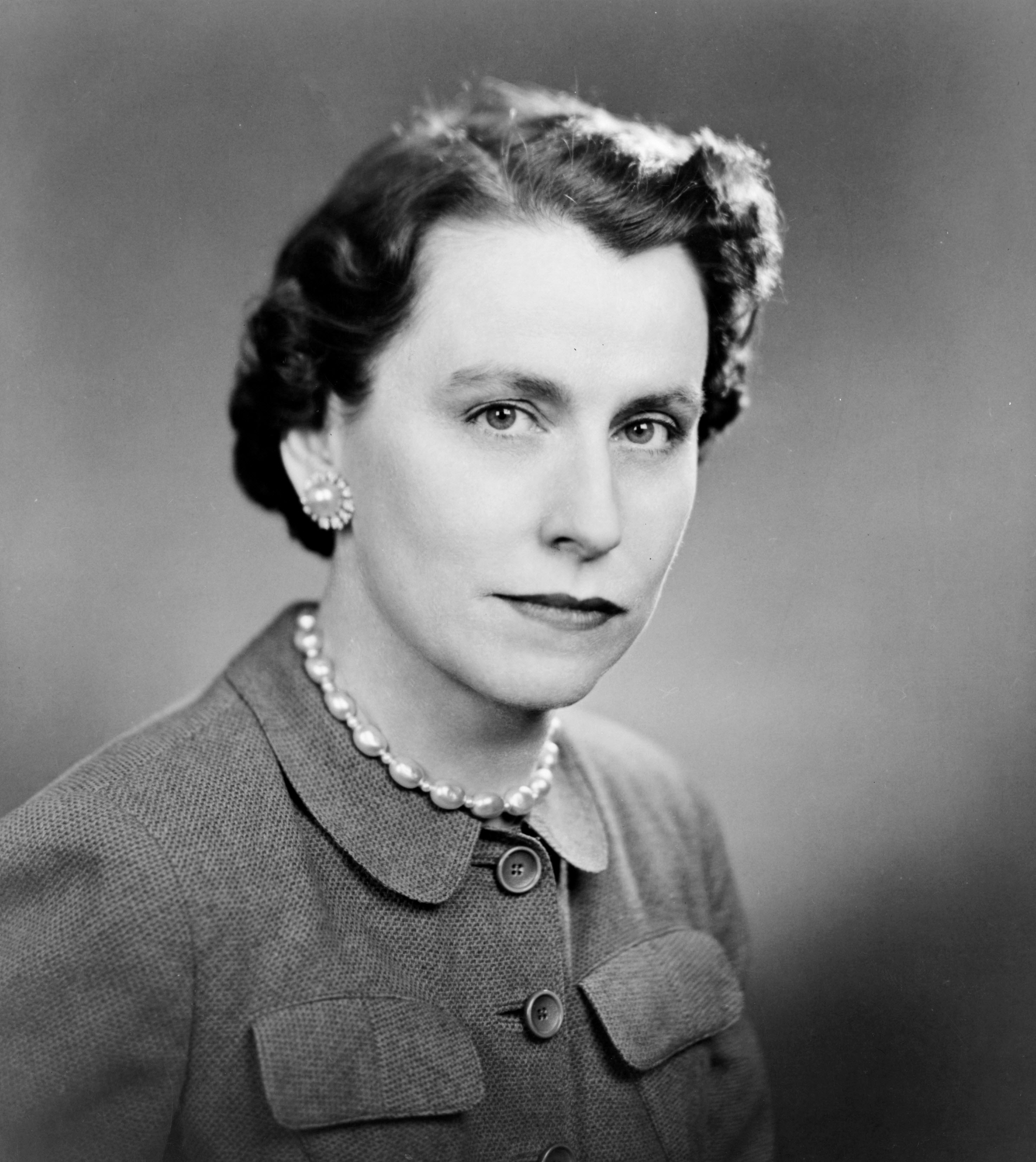
Martha Griffiths

- Mayor of Detroit: Albert Cobo (Republican)
- Mayor of Grand Rapids: George Veldman
- Mayor of Flint: George M. Algoe
- Mayor of Saginaw: George H. Fischer/Maurice E. Brown
- Mayor of Dearborn: Orville L. Hubbard
- Mayor of Lansing: Ralph Crego
- Mayor of Ann Arbor: William E. Brown Jr.

=== Federal office holders ===
- U.S. Senator from Michigan: Patrick V. McNamara (Democrat)
- U.S. Senator from Michigan: Charles E. Potter (Republican)
- House District 1: Thaddeus M. Machrowicz (Democrat)
- House District 2: George Meader (Republican)
- House District 3: August E. Johansen (Republican)
- House District 4: Clare Hoffman (Republican)
- House District 5: Gerald Ford (Republican)
- House District 6: Donald Hayworth (Democrat)
- House District 7: Jesse P. Wolcott (Republican)
- House District 8: Alvin Morell Bentley (Republican)
- House District 9: Ruth Thompson (Republican)
- House District 10: Elford Albin Cederberg (Republican)
- House District 11: Victor A. Knox (Republican)
- House District 12: John B. Bennett (Republican)
- House District 13: Charles Diggs (Democrat)
- House District 14: Louis C. Rabaut (Democrat)
- House District 15: John Dingell Sr. (Democrat)/John Dingell Jr. (Democrat)
- House District 16: John Lesinski Jr. (Democrat)
- House District 17: Martha Griffiths (Democrat)
- House District 18: George Anthony Dondero (Republican)

== Population ==
In the 1950 United States census, Michigan was recorded as having a population of 6,421,000 persons, ranking as the seventh most populous state in the country. By 1960, the state's population had grown 22.8% to 7,823,194 persons.

=== Cities ===
The following is a list of cities in Michigan with a population of at least 40,000 based on 1950 U.S. Census data. Historic census data from 1940 and 1960 is included to reflect trends in population increases or decreases. Cities that are part of the Detroit metropolitan area are shaded in tan.

1950 Rank	City	County	1940 Pop.	1950 Pop.	1960 Pop.	Change 1950-60
1	Detroit	Wayne	1,623,452	1,849,568	1,670,144	−9.7%
2	Grand Rapids	Kent	164,292	176,515	177,313	0.5%
3	Flint	Genesee	151,543	163,143	196,940	20.7%
4	Dearborn	Wayne	63,589	94,994	112,007	17.9%
5	Saginaw	Saginaw	82,794	92,918	98,265	5.8%
6	Lansing	Ingham	78,753	92,129	107,807	17.0%
7	Pontiac	Oakland	66,626	73,681	82,233	11.6%
8	Kalamazoo	Kalamazoo	54,097	57,704	82,089	42.4%
9	Bay City	Bay	47,956	52,523	53,604	2.1%
10	Jackson	Jackson	49,656	51,088	50,720	−0.7%
11	Battle Creek	Calhoun	43,453	48,666	44,169	−9.2%
12	Muskegon	Muskegon	47,697	48,429	46,485	−4.0%
13	Ann Arbor	Washtenaw	29,815	48,251	67,340	39.6%
14	Royal Oak	Oakland	25,087	46,898	80,612	71.9%
15	Warren	Macomb	23,658	42,653	89,246	109.2%

=== Counties ===
The following is a list of counties in Michigan with populations of at least 100,000 based on 1950 U.S. Census data. Historic census data from 1940 and 1960 are included to reflect trends in population increases or decreases. Counties that are part of the Detroit metropolitan area are shaded in tan.

1980 Rank	County	Largest city	1940 Pop.	1950 Pop.	1960 Pop.	Change 1950-60
1	Wayne	Detroit	2,015,623	2,435,235	2,666,297	9.5%
2	Oakland	Pontiac	254,068	396,001	690,259	74.3%
3	Kent	Grand Rapids	246,338	288,292	363,187	26.0%
4	Genesee	Flint	227,944	270,963	374,313	38.1%
5	Macomb	Warren	107,638	184,961	405,804	119.4%
6	Ingham	Lansing	130,616	172,941	211,296	22.2%
7	Saginaw	Saginaw	130,468	153,515	190,752	24.3%
8	Washtenaw	Ann Arbor	80,810	134,606	172,440	28.1%
9	Kalamazoo	Kalamazoo	100,085	126,707	169,712	33.9%
10	Muskegon	Muskegon	94,501	121,545	129,943	6.9%
11	Calhoun	Battle Creek	94,206	120,813	138,858	14.9%
12	Berrien	Benton Harbor	89,117	115,702	149,865	29.5%
13	Jackson	Jackson	93,108	108,168	131,994	22.0%

== Companies ==
The following is a list of major companies based in, or having a substantial manufacturing presence in, Michigan in 1955.

Fortune 500 Rank (1956)	Company	1955 sales (millions)	1955 net earnings (millions)	Headquarters	Nature of business
1	General Motors	12,443.3	1,189.5	Detroit	One of the "Big Three" automobile manufacturers and the largest corporation in the world
3	Ford Motor Company	5,594.0	437.0	Dearborn	One of the "Big Three" automobile manufacturers
5	Chrysler	3,466.2	100.1	Detroit	One of the "Big Three" automobile manufacturers
58	Bendix Aviation	567.2	25.9	Detroit	Parts supplier to auto industry
75	Studebaker-Packard	480.0	-29.7	Detroit and South Bend, IN	One of the "Little Three" automobile makers
77	Dow Chemical Co.	470.7	37.4	Midland	As of 1955, the fourth largest chemical firm in United States
81	American Motors	441.1	-7.0	Detroit	One of the "Little Three" automobile makers
na	S. S. Kresge Corp.	354.7	13.9	Detroit	National chain of over 600 dime stores
117	Electric Auto-Lite	296.0	10.1	Toledo, OH	Sparkplugs and auto parts company with Michigan manufacturing
122	Thompson Products	286.2	11.3	Cleveland	Automobile parts with manufacturing in Michigan (later became TRW)
127	Whirlpool-Seeger	280.4	14.1	Benton Harbor	Washers, dryers, and ironers
165	Fruehauf Trailer Co.	234.6	8.7	Detroit	Truck trailers
na	Detroit Edison	219.7	26.3	Detroit	Electric utility
169	Eaton Manufacturing	218.1	13.3	Cleveland, OH	Automobile parts
170	Burroughs	218.6	12.1	Detroit	Adding machines, computers, and other business equipment (later became Unisys)
182	Timken Roller Bearing	196.1	22.1	Canton, OH	Roller bearings with several Detroit plants
na	Consumers Power	189.4		Jackson	Electric and natural gas utility
190	Kellogg's	182.1	13.8	Battle Creek	Cereal foods
206	Kaiser Industries	164.0	5.1	Toledo	One of the "Little Three" automobile makers; Kaiser Motors was renamed Kaiser Industries in 1955, which also included Willys Motors and non-automobile enterprises
263	Clark Equipment Co.	150.7	9.5	Buchanan	Industrial and construction machinery
241	McLouth Steel	145.0	8.1	Detroit	Steel
272	Parke-Davis	123.1	14.3	Detroit	Pharmaceutical
302	Detroit Steel	101.8	6.3	Detroit	Steel
324	Ex-Cell-O	92.5	9.5	Detroit	Machine work
343	Gerber Products	86.7	5.5	Fremont	Baby food
350	Federal-Mogul	85.0	7.8	Detroit	Bearings and replacement parts for autos, trucks, and aircraft
372	Midland Steel Products	80.6	4.4	Cleveland	Automobile frames with manufacturing in Michigan
426	Mueller Brass Co.	67.7	2.5	Port Huron	Brass tubing and fitting
434	Calumet & Hecla	64.4	3.6	Chicago	Copper mining and smelting in northern Michigan
441	American Metal Products	63.5	4.3	Detroit	Automotive and aircraft parts manufacturing
na	Wrigley Supermarkets	--	--	Detroit	$332-million supermarket chain owned by John and Nathan Lurie
na	Upjohn	--	--	Kalamazoo	Pharmaceutical
na	Masco Screw Products	--	--	Dearborn	Screw machine parts and Delta faucets owned by Alex Manoogian
na	Michigan Bell	--	29.5	Detroit	Telephone utility

== Sports ==
=== Baseball ===
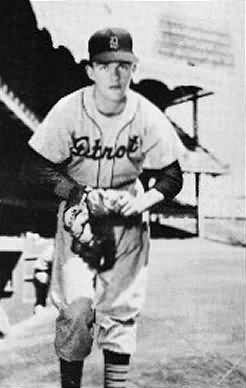
Billy Hoeft

- 1955 Detroit Tigers season – Under manager Bucky Harris, the Tigers compiled a 79–75 record and finished in fifth place in the American League. Al Kaline, at age 21, led all of Major League Baseball with a .340 batting average. The team's other statistical leaders included Kaline with 27 home runs, Ray Boone with 116 RBIs, and Billy Hoeft with 16 wins and a 2.99 earned run average.
- 1955 Michigan Wolverines baseball team - Under head coach Ray Fisher, the Wolverines compiled a 17–11–1 record. Dan Cline was the team captain.

=== American football ===
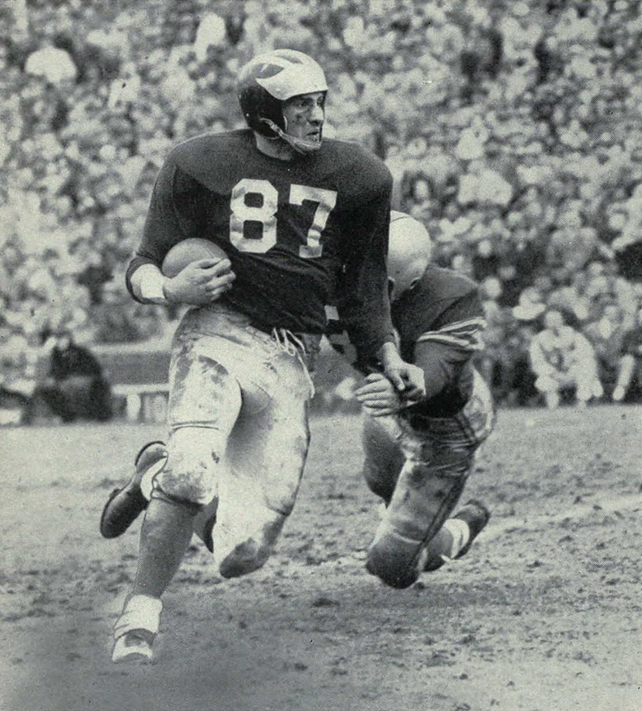
Ron Kramer starred for Michigan in both football and basketball.

- 1955 Detroit Lions season – After playing in the NFL Championship Game for three consecutive years, the Lions in 1955 compiled a 3–9 record and finished in sixth place in the NFL Western Conference. The team's statistical leaders included Bobby Layne with 1,830 passing yards, Lew Carpenter with 543 rushing yards, Dave Middleton with 663 receiving yards, and Doak Walker with 96 points scored.
- 1955 Michigan State Spartans football team – Under head coach Duffy Daugherty, the Spartans compiled a 9–1 record and were ranked No. 2 behind Oklahoma in the final AP Poll.
- 1955 Michigan Wolverines football team – Under head coach Bennie Oosterbaan, the Wolverines finished in third place in the Big Ten Conference with a record of 7–2 and were ranked No. 12 and No. 13 in the final AP and UPI Polls. Left end Ron Kramer was selected as a first-team All-American.
- 1955 Central Michigan Chippewas football team – Under head coach Kenneth "Bill" Kelly, the Chippewas compiled an 8–1 record (5–1 against IIAC opponents), tied for the Interstate Intercollegiate Athletic Conference (IIAC) championship, shut out three of nine opponents, and outscored all opponents by a combined total of 327 to 79.
- 1955 Detroit Titans football team – The Titans outscored their opponents by a combined total of 100 to 62 and finished with a 5–3–1 record under head coach Wally Fromhart.
- 1955 Michigan State Normal Hurons football team – Under head coach Fred Trosko, the Hurons compiled a 7–2 record, tied with Central Michigan for the IIAC championship, and outscored their opponents, 138 to 70.
- 1955 Western Michigan Broncos football team – Under head coach Jack Petoskey, the Broncos compiled a 1–7–1 record and were outscored by their opponents, 200 to 80.

=== Basketball ===
- 1954–55 Michigan Wolverines men's basketball team – Under head coach William Perigo, the Wolverines compiled an 11–11 record. Ron Kramer was the team's leading scorer with 352 points in 22 games for an average of 16.0 points per game.
- 1954–55 Michigan State Spartans men's basketball team – Under head coach Forddy Anderson, the Spartans compiled a 13–9 record.
- 1954–55 Detroit Titans men's basketball team – The Titans compiled a 15–11 record under head coach Bob Calihan.
- 1954–55 Western Michigan Broncos men's basketball team – Under head coach Joseph Hoy, the Broncos compiled a 12–10 record.

=== Ice hockey ===
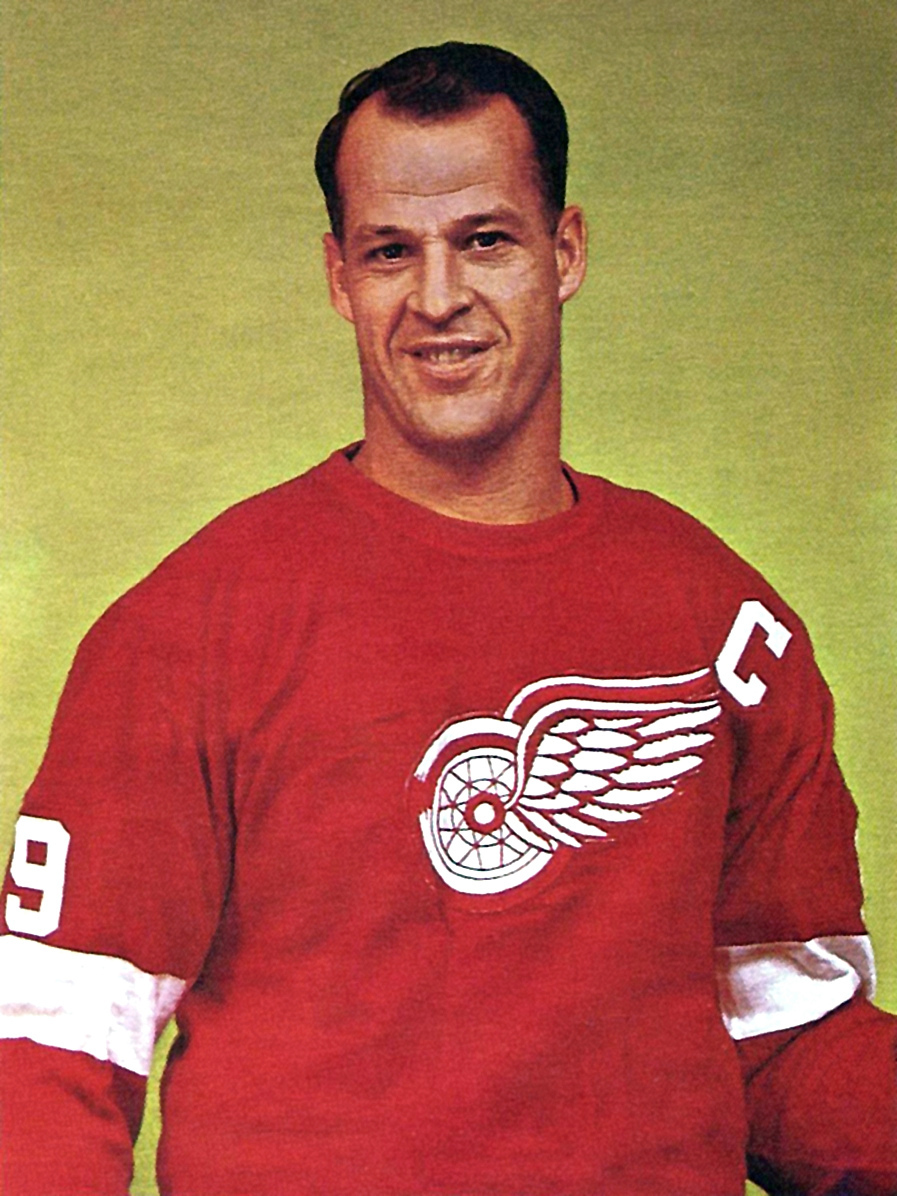
Gordie Howe led the Red Wings with 29 goals.

- 1954–55 Detroit Red Wings season – Under head coach Jimmy Skinner, the Red Wings compiled a 42–17–11 record and defeated the Montreal Canadiens in seven games in the 1955 Stanley Cup Final. The team's statistical leaders included Gordie Howe with 29 goals and Dutch Reibel with 41 assists and 66 points. Goaltender Terry Sawchuk won the Vezina Trophy.
- 1954–55 Michigan Wolverines men's ice hockey season – Under head coach Vic Heyliger, the team compiled an 18–5–1 record, outscored opponents 107 to 70, and won the 1955 NCAA Division I Men's Ice Hockey Tournament. The 1955 championship was Michigan's fifth NCAA hockey championship in eight years.
- 1954–55 Michigan State Spartans men's ice hockey team – Under head coach Amo Bessone, the Spartans compiled a 9–17–1 record.
- 1954–55 Michigan Tech Huskies men's ice hockey team – Under head coach Al Renfrew, Michigan Tech compiled a 12–13–1 record.

=== Boat racing ===
- Port Huron to Mackinac Boat Race – Glory Bea, a 33-foot sloop from the Bayview Yacht Club, won the annual race, completing the course on July 25 in 48 hours, 28 minutes, and 11 seconds.
- APBA Gold Cup – The race, held in Seattle, was won on August 7 by Detroit's Lee Schoenith in the Gale V.

=== Golfing ===
- 1955 PGA Championship – The 37th PGA Championship was held July 20–26 at Meadowbrook Country Club in Northville Township, northwest of Detroit. Doug Ford won the match play championship, 4 & 3, over Cary Middlecoff in a Tuesday playoff. The two finalists played 194 holes (12 rounds) in seven days.
- Michigan Open – Walter Burkemo won the Michigan Open on July 10 at the Owosso Country Club.

== Chronology of events ==
=== January ===
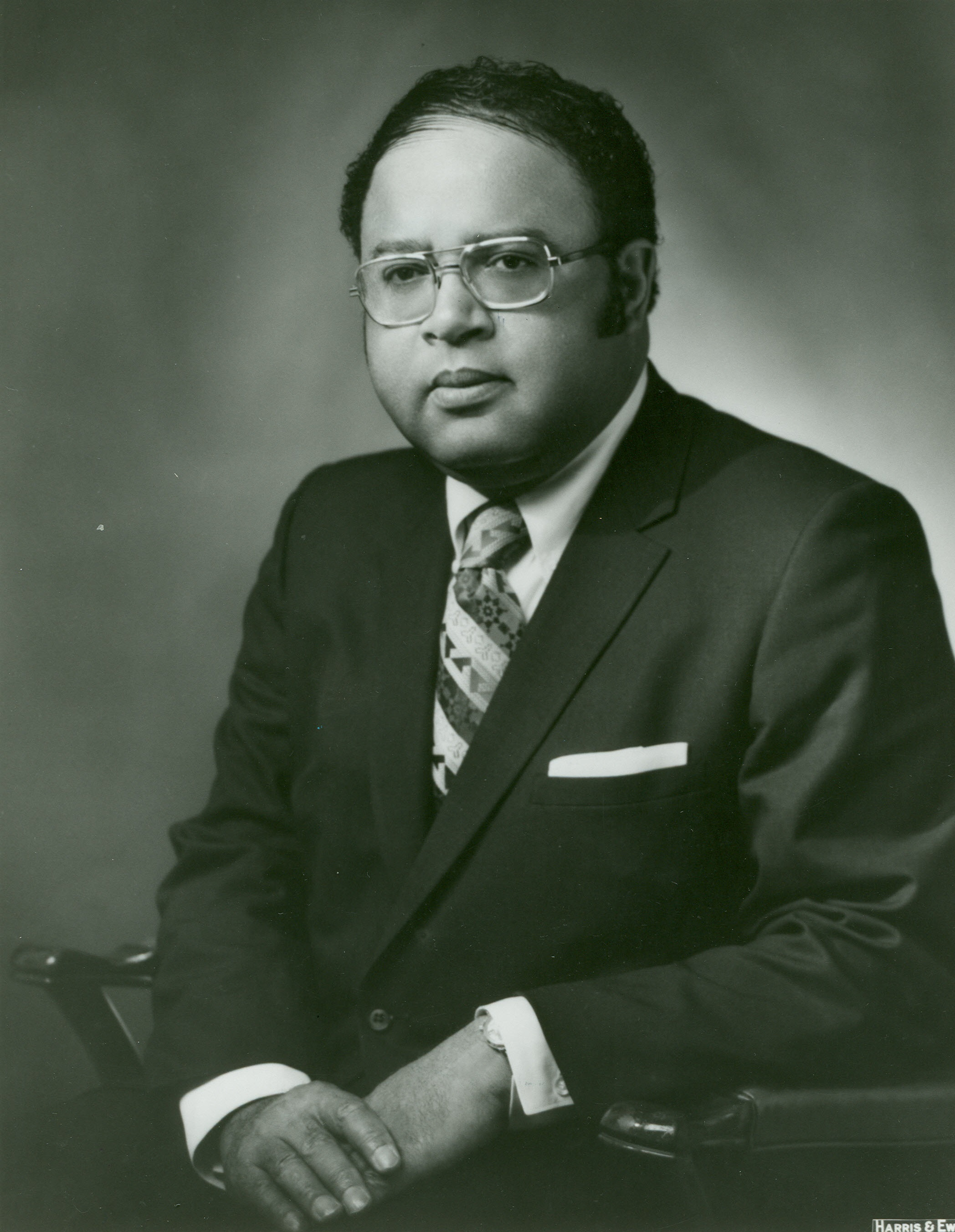
Charles Diggs

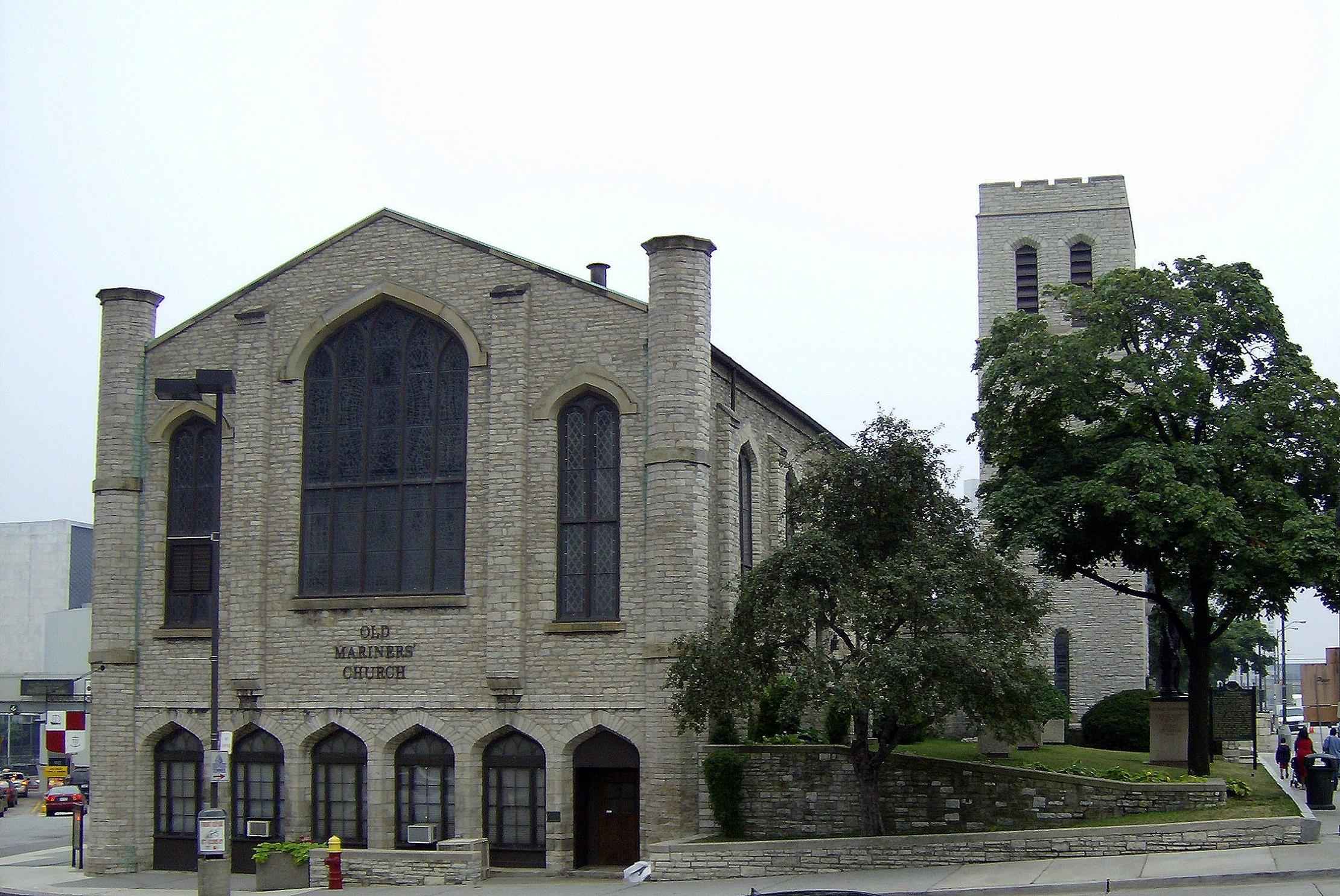
Mariner's Church

- January 1 - G. Mennen Williams was sworn in for his fourth term as Governor of Michigan. Some 5,000 persons attended the inaugural ceremony that included the firing of artillery guns, bands playing, and jets flying overhead. The ceremony also included the administration of oaths of office to Democrats Philip Hart as Lieutenant Governor, James M. Hare as Secretary of State, Thomas M. Kavanagh as Attorney General, Sanford A. Brown as State Treasurer, and Victor Targonski as Auditor General.
- January 5 - Democrat Patrick V. McNamara was sworn in as Michigan's junior U.S. Senator, having defeated Republican Homer S. Ferguson in the November election. Vice President Richard Nixon administered the oath of office. Four new members of the U.S. House of Representatives from Michigan also took office. The new members were: Republican August E. Johansen of Battle Creek; Democrat Donald Hayworth of East Lansing; Democrat Charles Diggs of Detroit (the first African-American to represent Michigan in Congress); and Democrat Martha Griffiths.
- January - Detroit native John H. Noble was freed after spending nearly 10 years in the Vorkuta gulag located nearly 100 miles above the Arctic Circle. He later wrote two books relating to his experiences.
- January 18 - The first multilevel freeway exchange in Michigan, connecting the Lodge and I-94 freeways, opened in downtown Detroit. The Detroit Free Press called it a scene of "utter confusion" at the morning rush hour as motorists tried to figure out the puzzle of driving through the interchange.
- January 20 - Mariners' Church was lifted from the original site in Detroit where it had been for 108 years and began its move to a new location on Jefferson Avenue.
- January 21 - The University of Michigan Board of Regents announced its plan to open a Flint campus on the site of Flint Junior College. The University of Michigan–Flint opened in 1956.

=== February ===
- February 10 - Ford Motor announced plans to build a 1.3 million square foot chassis parts plant at 17 Mile Road and Mound Road in Sterling Township.

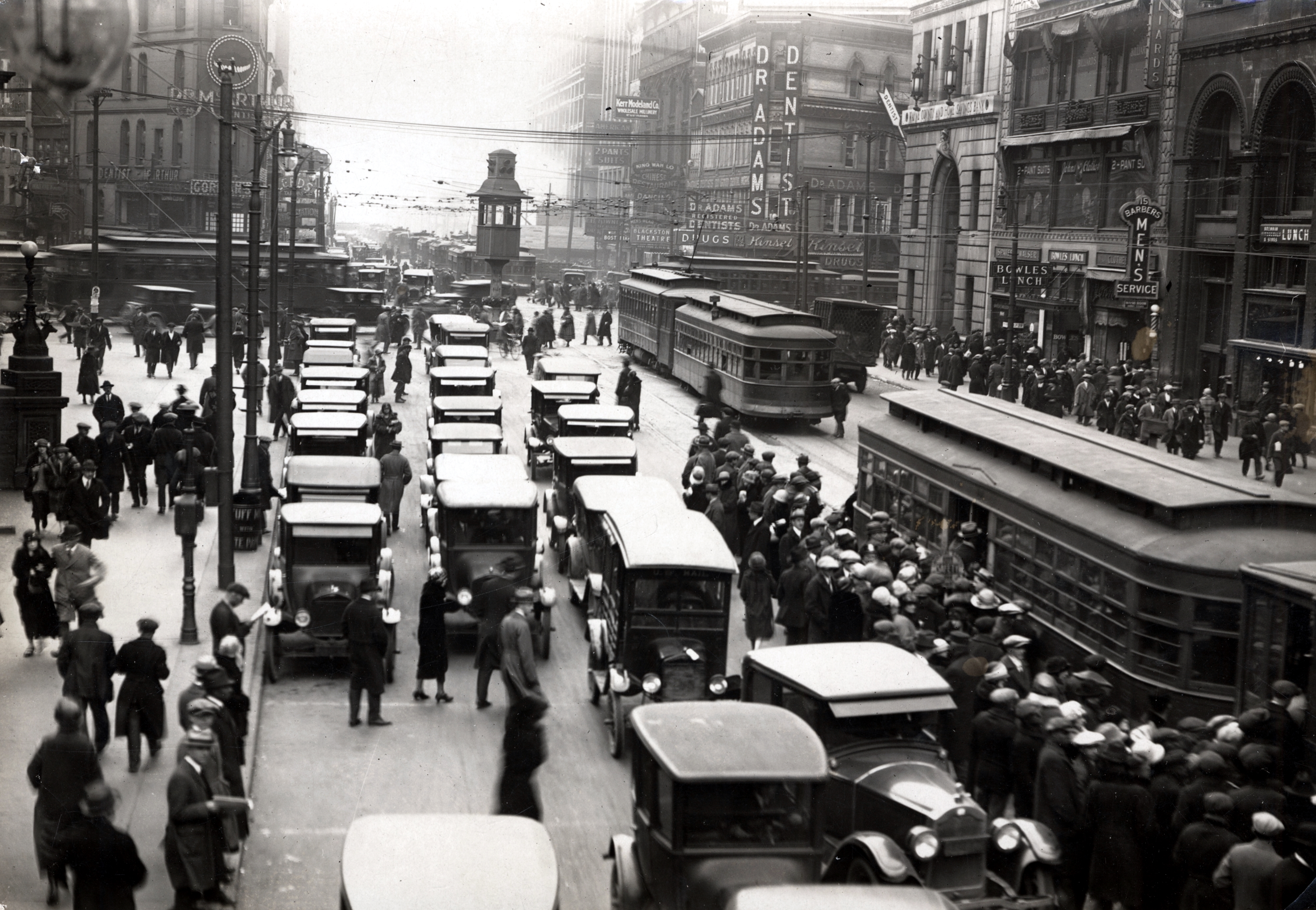
Detroit streetcars circa 1920

- February 12 - During the week ending Saturday, February 12, production of passenger cars reached a record of 167,095.
- February 17 - Floyd Diamond, a 16-year-old boy, was arrested after confessing to killing Kathleen McLaughlin, a 9-year-old girl. The girl's body was discovered in a pond in Farmington Township. She had been stabbed repeatedly in the torso and had a fractured skull.
- February 19 - After an attempted overthrow was quelled, John Feikens was reelected as chairman of the Michigan Republican Party. Feikens was later appointed to a federal judgeship by Presidents Eisenhower (1960), Kennedy (1961), and Nixon (1970); he remained a federal judge in Detroit until his death in 2011.
- February 23 - Leo Nowicki, general manager of the Department of Street Railways (DSR), proposed closing the city's last three streetcar lines—the Woodward, Gratiot, and Michigan lines. The proposal was the subject of heated debate at a meeting of the DSR Commission. Mayor Cobo noted that conversion of the streetcar lines to bus service would save $1.2 million in projected cost to repair the track and trolley line. The proposal would terminate trolley service which began in Detroit in 1863 with horse-drawn trolleys.
- February 26 - A proposal to urge Gov. G. Mennen Williams to run for President in 1956 gained support at Michigan's Democratic Party state convention in Grand Rapids.

=== March ===
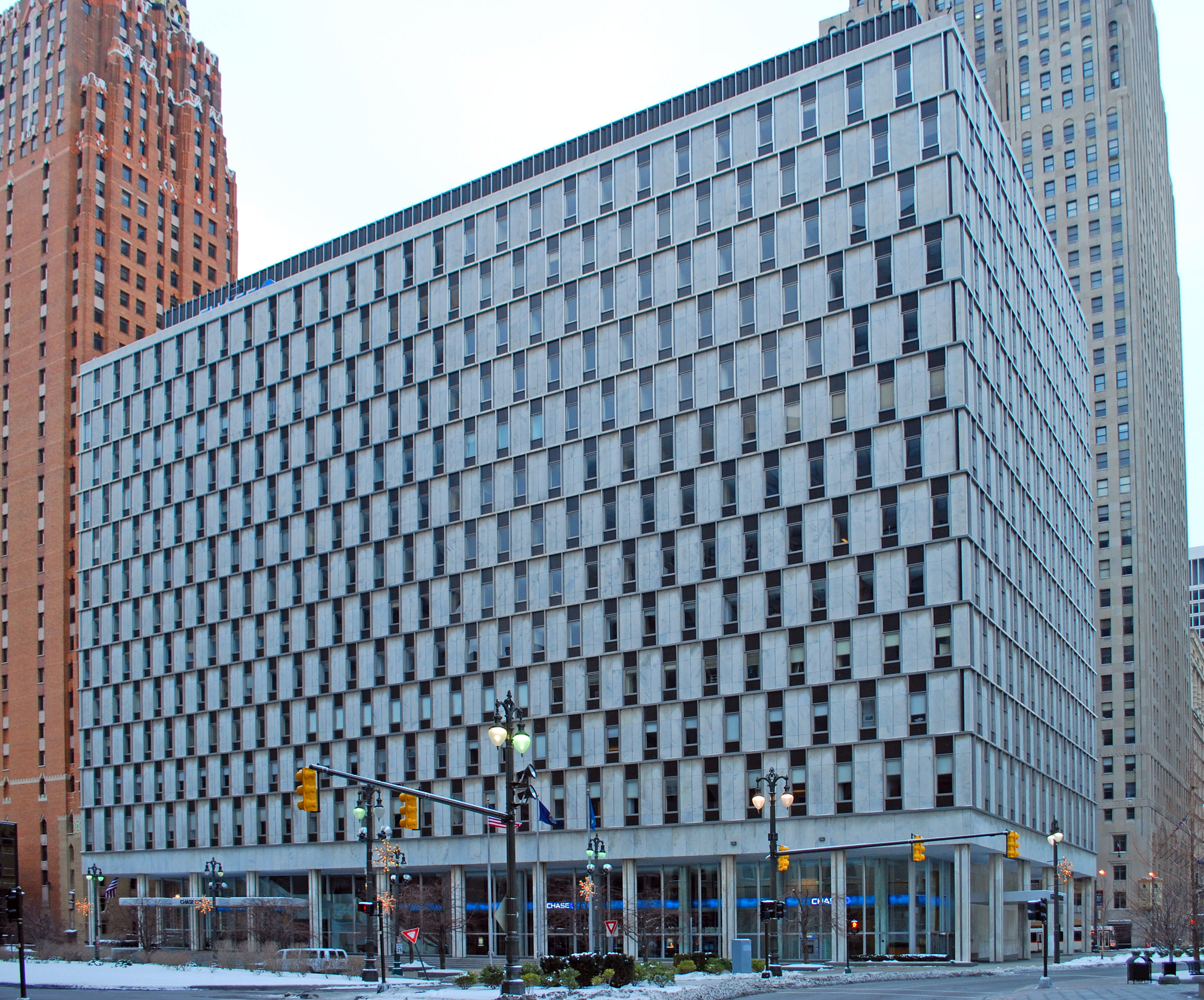
Former NBD building

- March 2 - General Motors Chairman Alfred P. Sloan and CEO Harlow Curtice released the company's 1954 financial results. The company reported earnings of $806 million on sales of $9.8 billion. The earnings were the second highest in company history and were achieved despite a 29% reduction in company sales to the military.
- March 3 - National Bank of Detroit (NBD) acquired a city block in downtown Detroit bounded by Woodward, Griswold, Fort, and Congress. One week later, NBD announced plans to build a 12-story banking building on the site. The building, originally known as the National Bank of Detroit Building, was opened in October 1959. In 2011, the building was acquired by Quicken Loans and renamed The Qube.

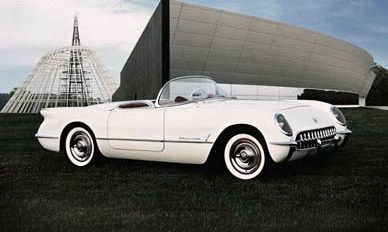
1954 Chevrolet Corvette

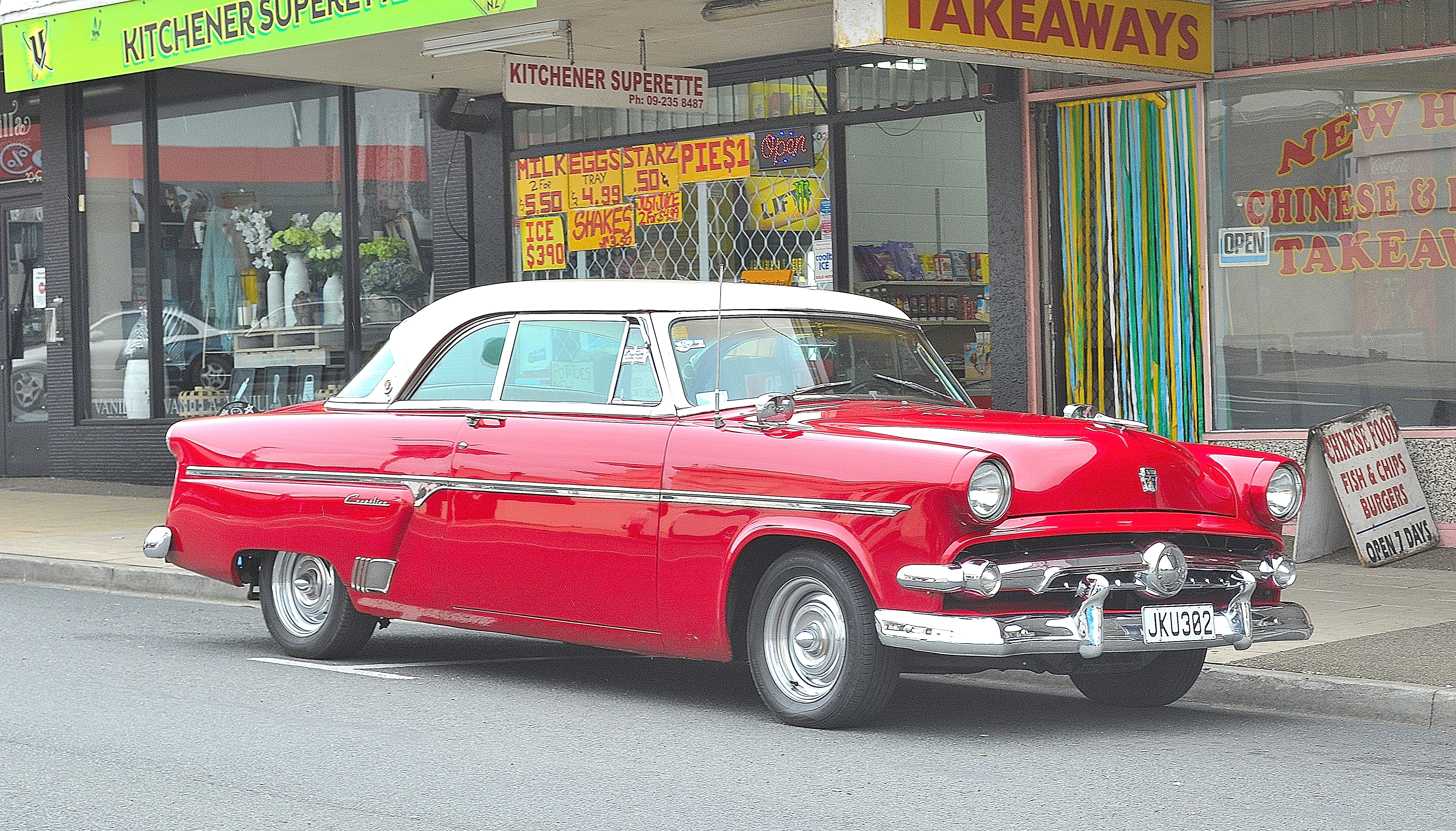
1954 Ford Victoria

- March 4 - According to final figures released by R.L. Polk & Co., Chevrolet was the top selling automobile brand in 1954 with 1,417,453 new cares registered. Ford was second with 1,400,440 cars registered. Ford disputed the totals, contending out that Chevrolet's totals were artificially inflated with 56,802 cars registered in dealer names but not yet sold.
- March 10 - Pravda criticized the inefficiency of the Soviet machine building industry and opined that it "could learn a lot from Detroit and Pittsburgh."
- March 14 - Negotiations began between the United Auto Workers (UAW) and General Motors over a new collective bargaining agreement, and preliminary discussions with Ford began two days later. The big issue in the negotiations was the UAW's demand for a guaranteed annual wage (GAW), assuring union members a year-around wage regardless of seasonal or other layoffs. Reuther banked on the competition between Ford and General Motors to persuade one of them to concede on the GAR. On April 29, the UAW extended GM's contract, making Ford the chief target in the GAW negotiations. The union asked that Ford set aside 4% of the company's base payroll until a $500 million reserve fund was in place to guarantee 52 weeks of payments to the company's 455,000 employees.
- March 17 - During a game at the Montreal Forum between the Montreal Canadiens and Detroit Red Wings, rioting broke out in response to the decision of NHL President Clarence Campbell to suspend Montreal star Maurice Richard. One fan set off a tear gas canister inside the arena, and Campbell was punched and struck by an avalanche of debris. The game was stopped with Detroit ahead, 4-1, resulting in a forfeit. The rioting then spread into the streets with 74 arrests in a night of looting and window smashing. Detroit general manager Jack Adams called the riot the most disgraceful thing he had seen in 39 years of hockey.
- March 18 - General Motors (GM) CEO Harlow Curtice testified before the U.S. Senate Banking Committee that the automobile industry was as competitive as he had ever seen it and that GM had no chance of becoming a monopoly.
- March 18 - After Michigan State College submitted a bill to the state legislature seeking to change its name to Michigan State University, the University of Michigan Board of Regents opposed the name change on grounds that it would create confusion and "dilute the prestige of the University of Michigan." Informal meetings between the two university governing boards failed to reach a resolution. Despite the objections from Ann Arbor, the Michigan Senate approved the name change on April 13, and Gov. Williams later signed the bill.
- March 20 - The Detroit Red Wings defeated the Montreal Canadiens, 7-0, in the final game of the regular season. The Wings won their seventh consecutive regular season NHL title.

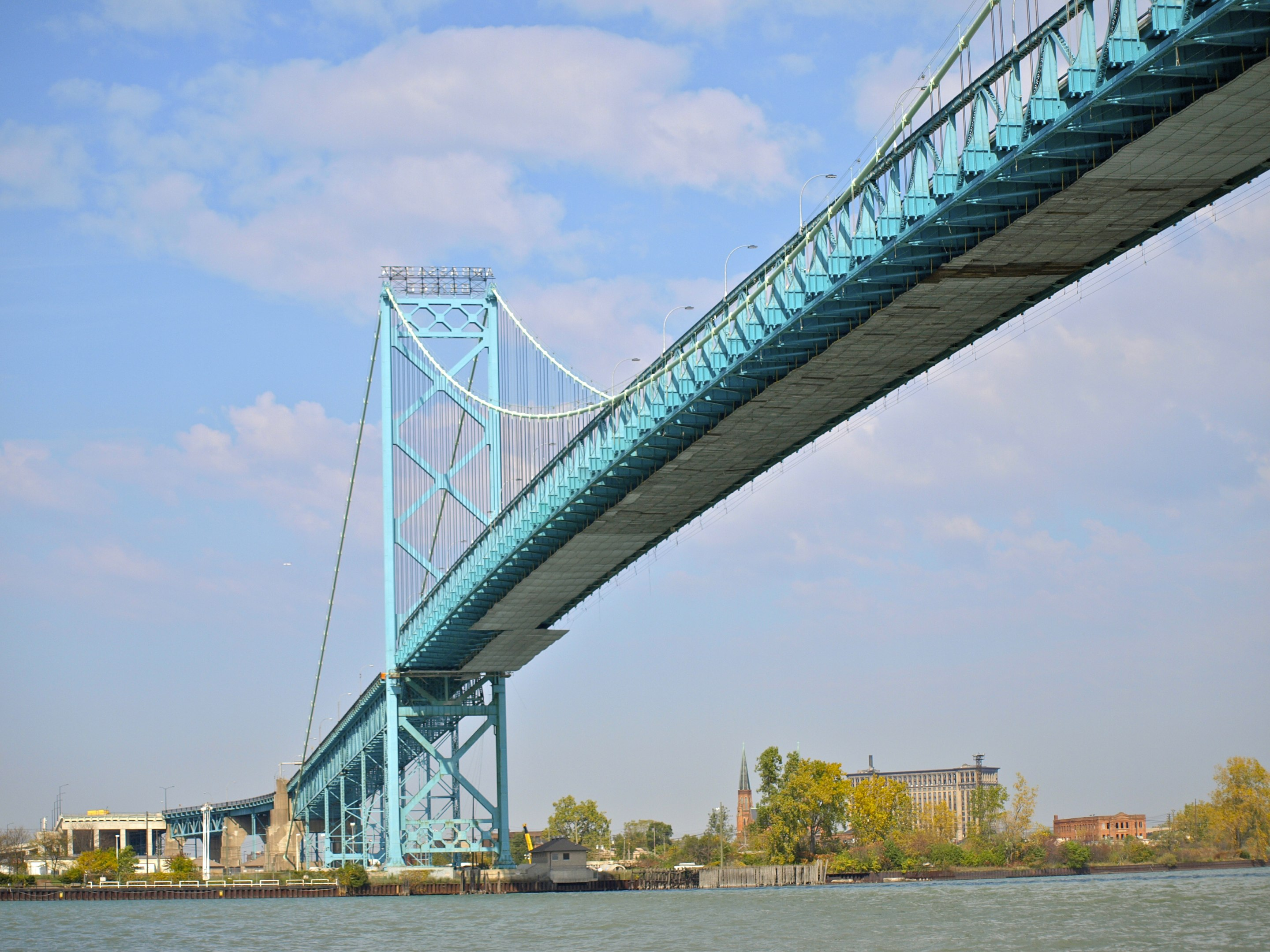
Ambassador Bridge

- March 21 - Dearborn Mayor Orville Hubbard fired all six attorneys on the city's legal staff when they refused to sign off on a legal opinion dictated by Hubbard supporting his effort to raise his salary from $6,500 to $24,500. The Detroit Free Press called the firing the "latest Hubbard dictatorial move."
- March 21 - Jean Claude Simard, a French-Canadian, was arrested after tightrope walking from Windsor to Detroit on a girder along the Ambassador Bridge. Simard wore a jacket with a Detroit Red Wings emblem as he walked the one-mile span of the bridge.
- March 31 - The mutilated body of seven-year-old Barbara Gaca, missing since March 24 and the subject of a massive search effort, was discovered in a wooded area southwest of Pontiac. An autopsy showed that she had been raped, strangled, stabbed 15 times, and struck with a heavy blow on the back of her head.

=== April ===
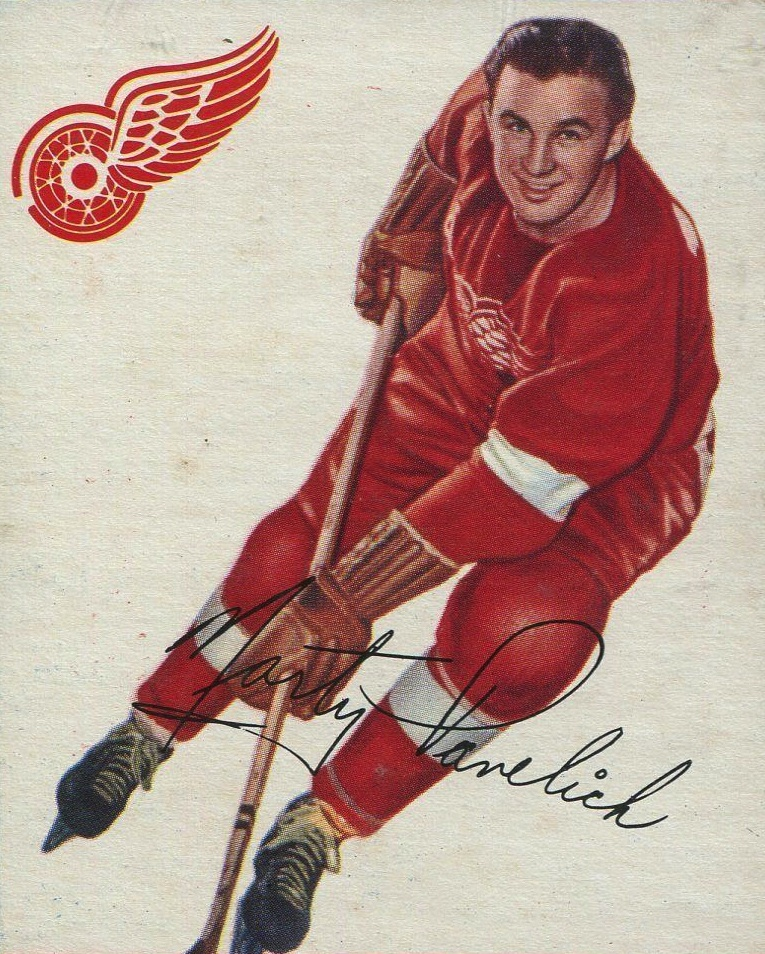
Marty Pavelich

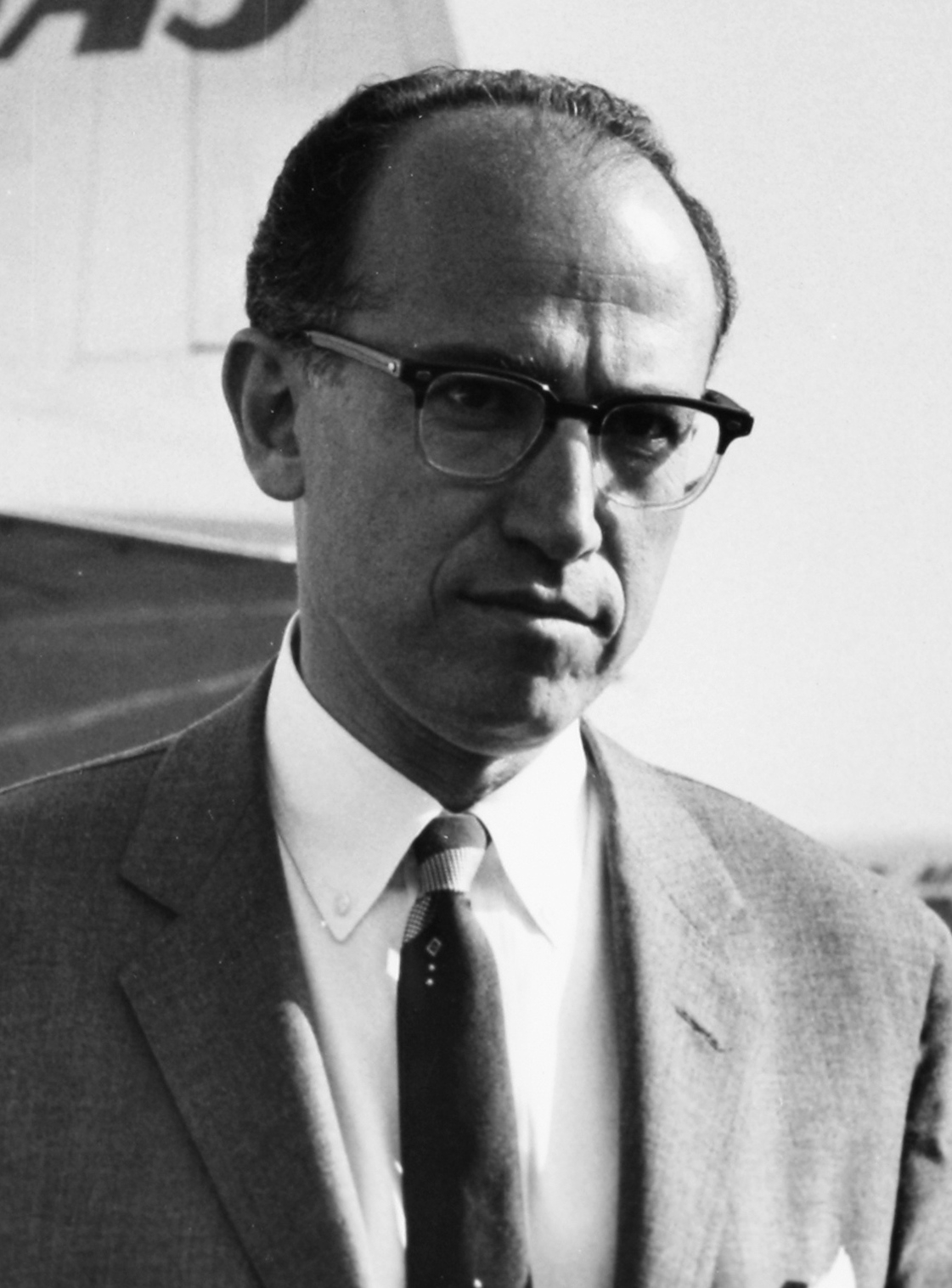
Jonas Salk

- April 3 - In Game 1 of the Stanley Cup Final, Detroit's Marty Pavelich scored a short-handed goal to break a 2-2 ties with three minutes left in the game. Detroit won the game.
- April 4 - Democrats dominated in state elections.
- April 5 - The Detroit Red Wings defeated the Montreal Canadiens, 7-1, in Game 2 of the Stanley Cup Final at Olympia Stadium. Ted Lindsay scored four goals. The win was the 15th straight for the Red Wings, setting a new NHL record and eclipsing the prior record of 14 games set by Boston in 1930.
- April 7 - Bernie Geoffrion scored a hat trick to pace the Canadiens to victory in Game 3 of the Stanley Cup Final.
- April 10 - Gordie Howe scored a hat trick, all three goals in an 18-minute span, to lead the Red Wings to a victory in Game 5 of the Stanley Cup Final.
- April 12 - At a meeting in Ann Arbor sponsored by the University of Michigan and the National Foundation for Infantile Paralysis, Dr. Thomas Francis Jr. announced that the United States Secretary of Welfare had approved the Salk vaccine for general use after determining it to be safe, effective, and potent in providing long-lasting immunity to polio. The Detroit Free Press wrote: "No other event in medical annals has been surrounded by the glamor and glare," as "academic halls were taken over by klieg lights and an army of newsmen."
- April 14 - The Red Wings defeated the Canadiens in Game 7 of the Stanley Cup Final before a crowd of 15,541 at Olympia Stadium. Alex Delvecchio scored two goals. The two teams combined for a record 47 goals in the seven-game series.
- April 17 - Al Kaline hit three home runs in a 16-0 victory over Kansas City, had six RBIs, and boosted his batting average to .561.
- April 21 - General Motors reported first quarter sales of $2.4 billion and record earnings of $309 million.
- April 26 - A dynamite bomb thrown from a car exploded outside the Detroit home of Recorders Court Judge W. McKay Skillman. Neither the judge nor his home were injured.
- April 28 - Henry Ford II announced that Ford Motor would invest $625 million over the next three years in new plants and equipment.

=== May ===
- May 2 - Royce Howes of the Detroit Free Press won the Pulitzer Prize for distinguished editorial writing in 1954. The prize was awarded for an editorial written by Howes about the July 1954 Chrysler strike that idled 45,000 Chrysler workers. It appeared in the newspaper on July 26, 1954.
- May 2 - Former Detroit Tiger star Hank Greenberg was sued for divorce by his wife Caral Gimbel Greenberg, of the Gimbels department store family. She alleged "extreme cruelty and gross neglect" and sought sole custody of their three children.
- May 3 - A heat wave covered Michigan with a record high temperature of 88 degrees recorded in Detroit. With temperatures reaching 87 degrees the following day, schools in Roseville, Michigan, closed due to a water shortage.
- May 2 - A strike by the United Steel Workers shut down operations at Calumet & Hecla's copper smelter in Houghton from May 2 to August 22. The strike idled 2,200 workers at the smelter and at the company's copper mines. The settlement came with a two-year contract providing a 15 cent per hour raise in the first year and a four percent increase in the second year.
- May 6 - President Eisenhower met with Detroit trucker Floyd Pemberton at the White House. Pemberton was named "Trucker of the Year" for rescuing two women from a burning automobile in December 1954.
- May 12 - A court hearing was held in the battle for control of the Vernors ginger ale company. James Vernor Sr. died in 1954, leaving the company stock in trust for his son James Vernor Jr. and his minor children. His second wife, whom he married in 1952, was left the family home in Bloomfield Hills, but sued to invalidate the trust and obtain control of the company.
- May 15 - The Detroit Free Press celebrated Michigan Week with a compilation of facts about Michigan's ranking in various fields, including the following: first in the country with 2,200 miles of shoreline (in addition to 11,000 lakes and 36,000 miles of streams); per capita earnings of $1,949 ($404 above the national average); family spending for retail goods at $4,417 ($840 above the national average); 12,000 factories employing more than a million workers; Detroit ranking first in production of adding machines (Burroughs), foundry products, ranges and heating devices, and heavy chemicals; top producer of canned baby food (Gerber); Muskegon with the largest factory for billiard tables and bowling alleys; world's largest pharmaceutical plant (Upjohn in Kalamazoo); first in production of red tart cherries, cantaloupes, strawberries, and blueberries; second in production of plums, mint, and navy beans; third in production of grapes; and fourth in the production of apples.
- May 26 - In lieu of a GAW provision, Ford proposed a "Partnership in Prosperity Plan" (PIPP) which provided for selling shares of Ford common stock to UAW members at half price when it was offered to the public in 1956. The UAW quickly rejected the proposal. Some referred to Ford's stock offer plan as "worker capitalism". On May 28, the UAW set a strike date of June 2. Convinced that workers would support the company's PIPP proposal Ford asked that it be presented to UAW members. UAW President Walter Reuther responded that by offering to submit both plans (GAW and PIPP) to workers in a binding poll, if the company would agree to be bound by the result. On May 31, after Ford agreed to consider a modified GAW plan, the UAW extended the strike deadline until June 6. After details of Ford's public offering were announced, the Detroit Free Press in November reported that the UAW's decision to choose the modified GAW over the PIPP proposal cost UAW workers $152 per year.

=== June ===
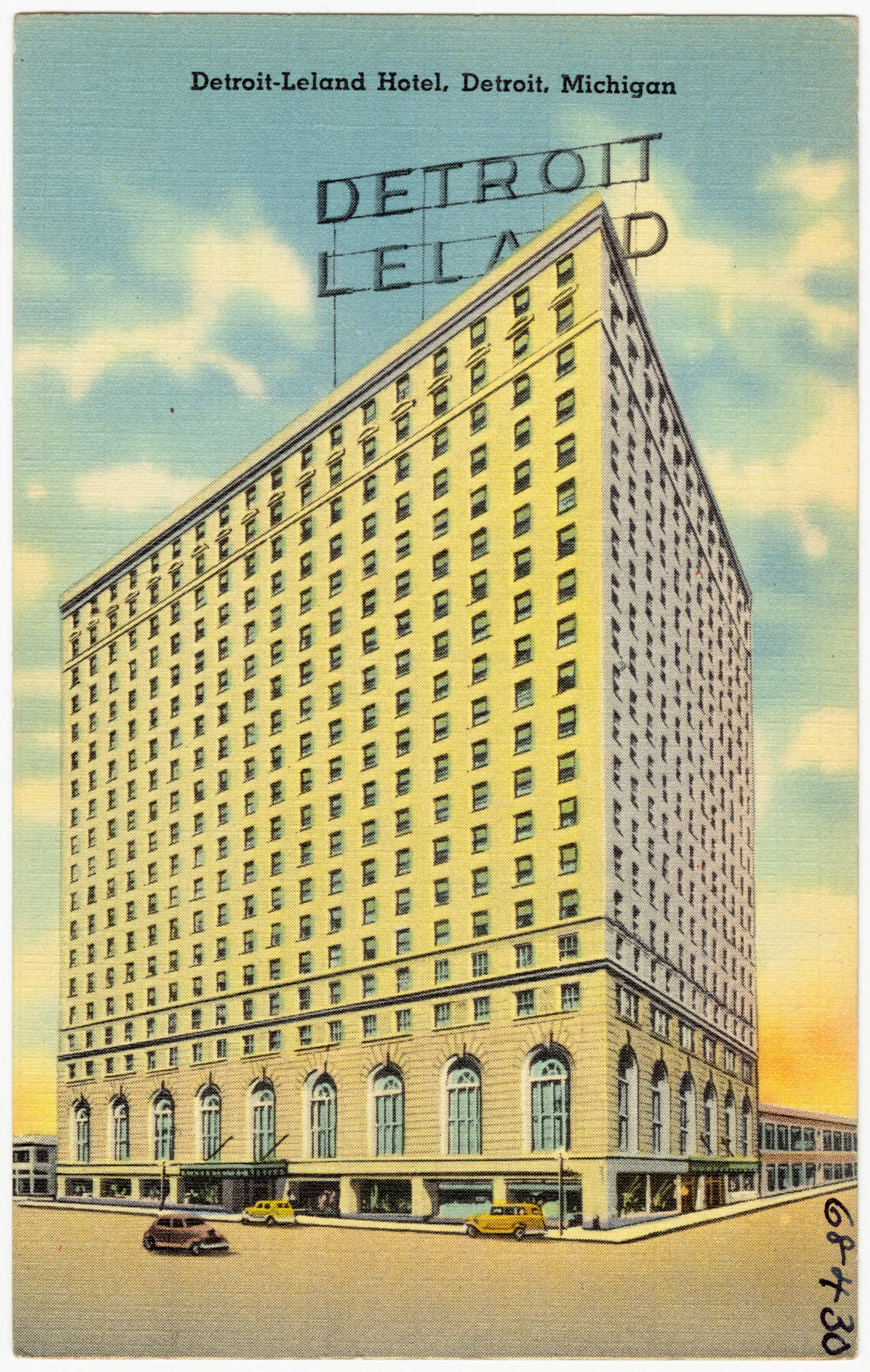
Detroit-Leland Hotel where Ford and the UAW negotiated the modified GAW

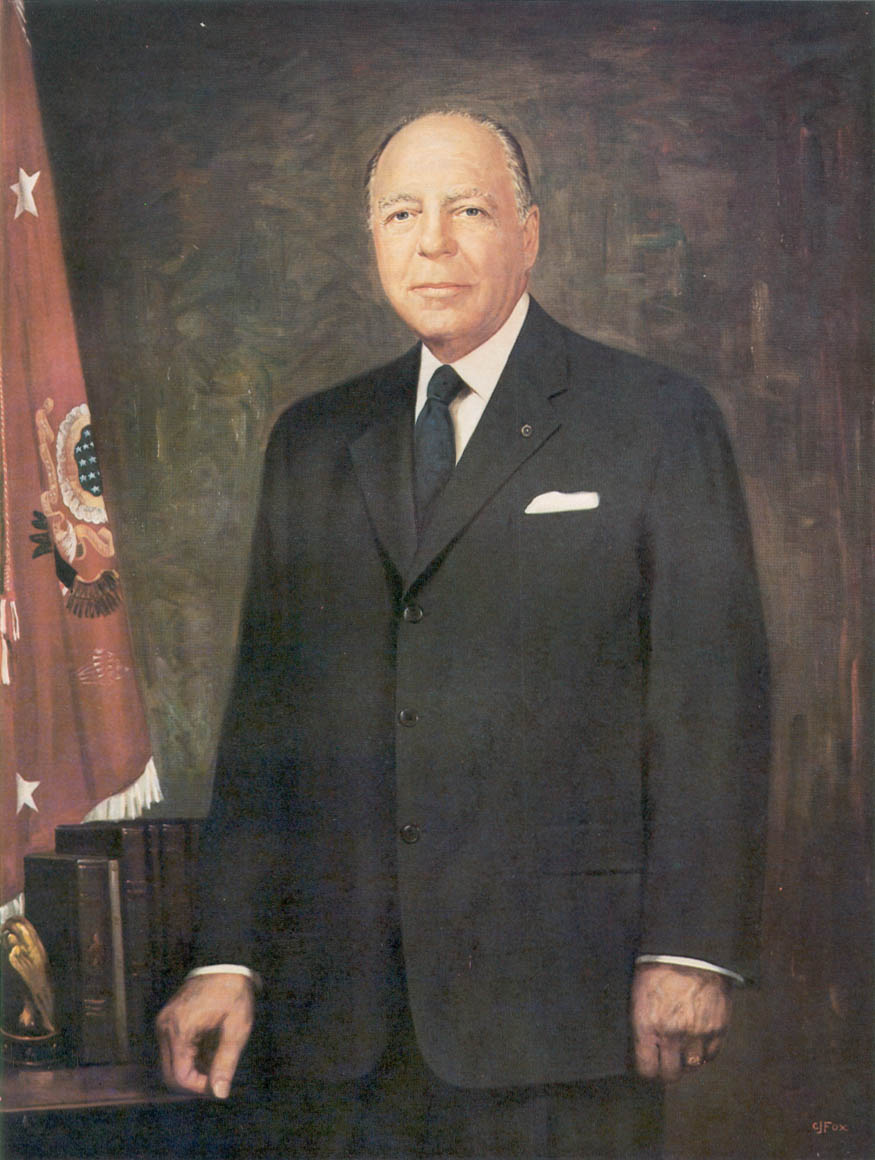
Wilber M. Brucker, the "man who laughed at Senator McCarthy"

- June 1 - The mutilated body of eight-year-old Jeannie Singleton, missing since May 23, was found in a wooded area north of Kalamazoo. An autopsy showed that she had been raped, beaten, and strangled.
- June 6 - After a final, 30-hour marathon negotiating session at the Detroit-Leland Hotel, Ford Motor reached a three-year agreement with the UAW that included a modified version of the guaranteed annual wage (GAW) provision sought by the UAW. The agreement, described as "revolutionary", guaranteed a laid-off worker "a reasonable living" for six months. The Detroit Free Press reported at the time that the accord touched off a debate as to whether it would "drive the country to socialism or provide a new built-in security that will stabilize employment and assure prosperity."
- June 7 - Residents of Southfield and Troy, previously organized as townships, voted to incorporate as cities. Both cities experienced rapid growth after incorporating. Southfield grew by 119.8% from 31,531 in 1960 to 69,298 in 1970. Troy grew by nearly 400% from 19,402 in 1960 to 80,959 in 2010.
- June 10 - With the Ford contract behind, the UAW set a June 12 strike deadline with General Motors. On June 12, after 37 hours of continuous negotiations, the UAW and General Motors agreed to a three-year pact giving a modified guaranteed wage to 350,000 GM workers. Walter Reuther said the concessions were worth $600 million over three years and represented more than 20 cents an hour in benefits. The GM pact followed the Ford model in requiring the company to supplement unemployment benefits, allowing workers to draw 60 to 65% of take-home pay for 26 weeks in the event of a layoff. With approval of a modified GAW by both Ford and GM, it was suggested that "big labor" had emerged in the United States as a force that "could grow more powerful . . . than big business ever was." Labor expert Edwin A. Lahey opined that big labor strikes were dead and noted that the largest corporation in the world had made concessions "that were and will remain highly repugnant to the industrial traditionalists." GM reportedly "abhorred and feared" the GAW and would have preferred a long strike to the GAW if it had been the first to negotiate, suggesting Reuther's wisdom in choosing Ford as the UAW's first target on the GAW.
- June 15 - A civil defense exercise simulated an atomic bomb being dropped at Livernois and Fort Streets in Detroit at 2:39. Due to mass evacuation ordered at 11:03 a.m., the projected death toll dropped from 94,800 to 57,600.
- June 22 - General Motors announced a $500 million expansion and modernization plan that the company hoped would create an additional 28,000 jobs annually.
- June 22 - President Eisenhower appointed former Michigan Gov. Wilber M. Brucker as Secretary of the Army. Brucker had become known as the "man who laughed at Senator McCarthy" after he became amused at questions posed by the Senator during the Army–McCarthy hearings. Brucker's his laugh "boomed through the hearing room" and was credited with dissipating an atmosphere of fear and hatred surrounding the hearings.
- June 26 - Eaton Manufacturing reached agreement with the UAW which included supplemental unemployment benefits consistent with the Ford and GM modified GAW, covering 4,100 workers at plants in Detroit, Cleveland, Battle Creek, and Marshall, Michigan. By late June, the modified GAW was reported to be "mushrooming throughout the subsidiary automobile industry," including smaller parts and tool companies. As Lincoln ended its 1955 model production at the end of June, the company announced that it did not anticipate model-changeover layoffs, a shift in past patterns which was attributed to the GAW provision. On August 13, the GAW model was adopted and expanded by the United Steel Workers who negotiated a contract providing a full year of supplementary unemployment benefits for 20,000 steelworkers employed by American Can Co. and 15,000 more employed by Continental Can Co.

=== July ===
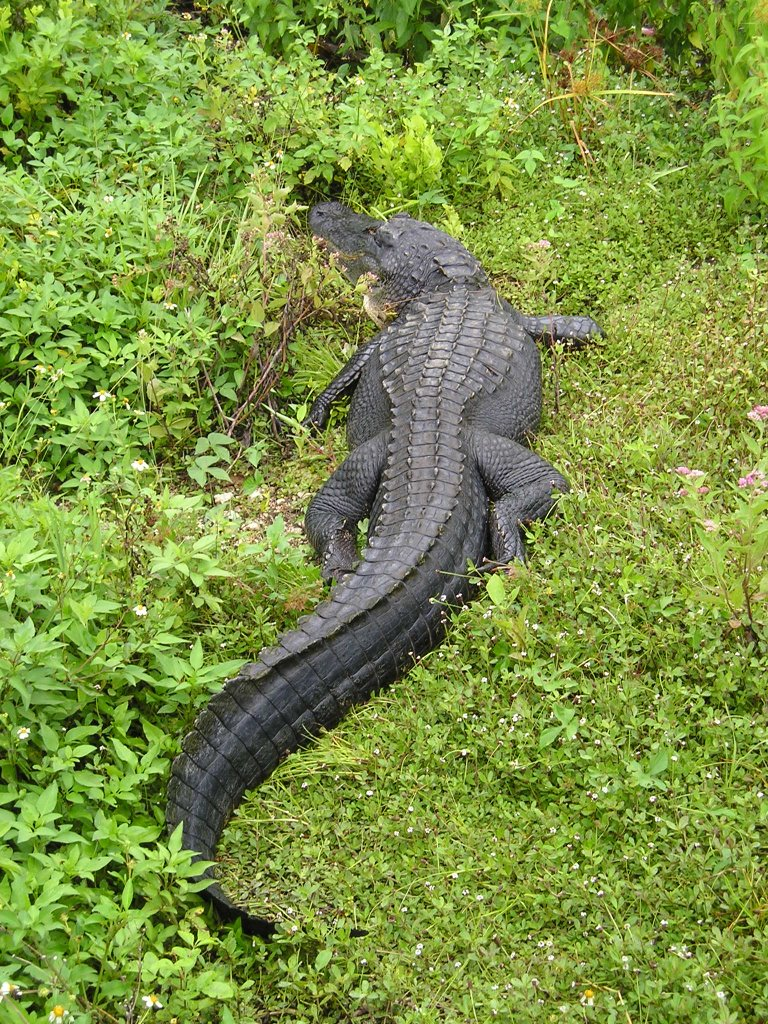
Reports of an alligator in Lower Long Lake

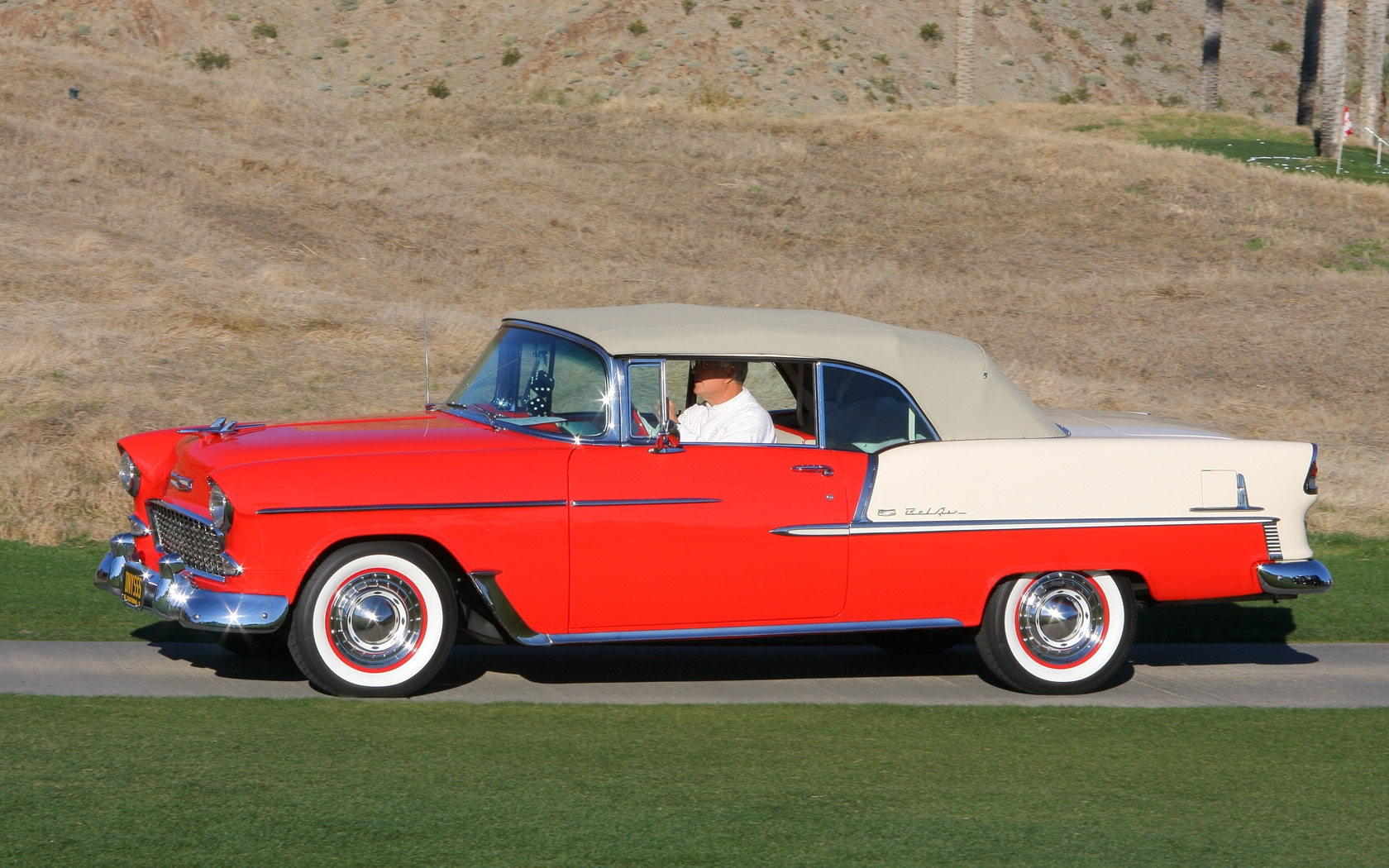
1955 Chevrolet Bel Air

- July–September - A major heat wave struck Michigan during the summer months, and by September 20, Detroit had recorded a record 32 days temperatures exceeding 90 degrees. In early July, the heat shut down Chrysler's automobile production. Also in July, a water shortage developed in metropolitan Detroit, and Mayor Cobo urged residents to limit water usage to that which was essential. A ban on lawn sprinkling remained in effect for most of the summer in Detroit and 40 suburban communities. The heat wave led to record water usage of in Detroit of 695 million gallons on July 6, and that record was broken two weeks later with 725 million gallons consumed on July 21. Laurence Lenhardt, general manager of the Detroit Water Department, noted that the water shortage resulted from the city's lack of facilities to purify, pump, and distribute enough water to keep up with increased demand. Lenhardt announced his resignation on August 5 after being publicly criticized by Mayor Cobo.
- July/August - Reports of an alligator in Lower Long Lake in Bloomfield Township, Michigan, attracted an alligator wrestler with a female alligator as a lure to the lake.
- July 1 - Automobile production in the first six months of 1955 totaled 4,899,000, a record figure that surpassed full year production for every year prior to World War II as well as several postwar years. The production breakdown was 2,458,646 by General Motors, 1,344,568 by Ford, and 849,129 for Chrysler.
- July 11 - The water was shut off in Utica, Michigan, after high levels of chromium waste was discovered in the water supply. On July 13, Detroit offered to supply water to Utica as water there remained highly contaminated. Utica's water system was shut off again on September 15 when unsafe levels of chromium were again detected. The city's schools were closed, and chromium waste from Pontiac was blamed. On September 20, the Pontiac Division of General Motors agreed to reimburse the city's expenses in connection with the water crisis. The company also agreed to take steps to avoid further discharges of chromium into the Clinton River.
- July 20 - A federal grand jury issued a four-count indictment against the UAW for allegedly using union dues to support Democratic candidates for office. UAW officials charged that the indictment was the result of Republican political gamesmanship. UAW secretary-treasurer Emil Mazey said on August 6 that the Justice Department offered to dismiss the indictment if the UAW would disavow having used general-fund money for political purposes, but that the UAW refused to do so and intended to vindicate its First Amendment right to pay for political programs and have union-supported candidates on those programs.

=== August ===
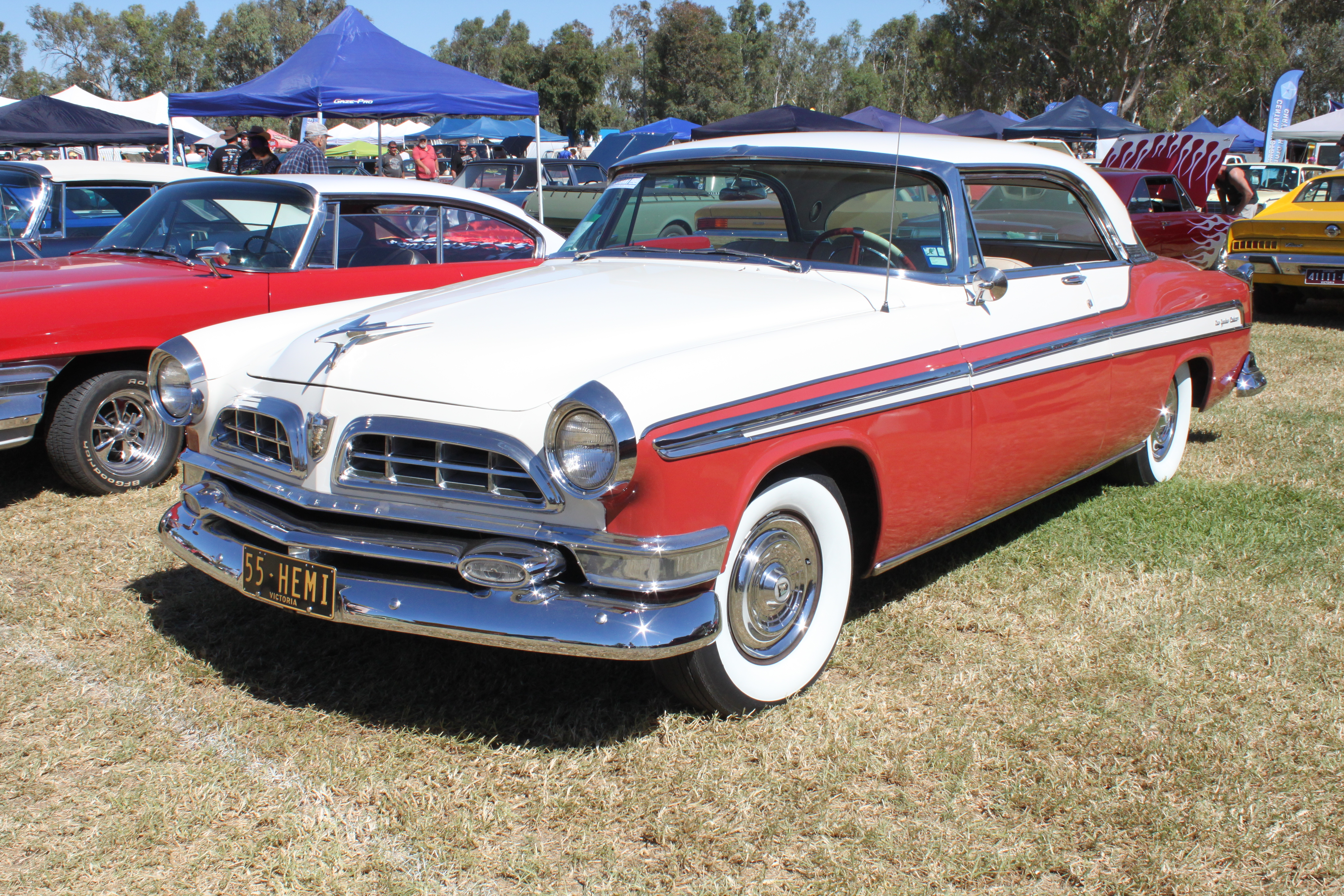
1955 Chrysler New Yorker

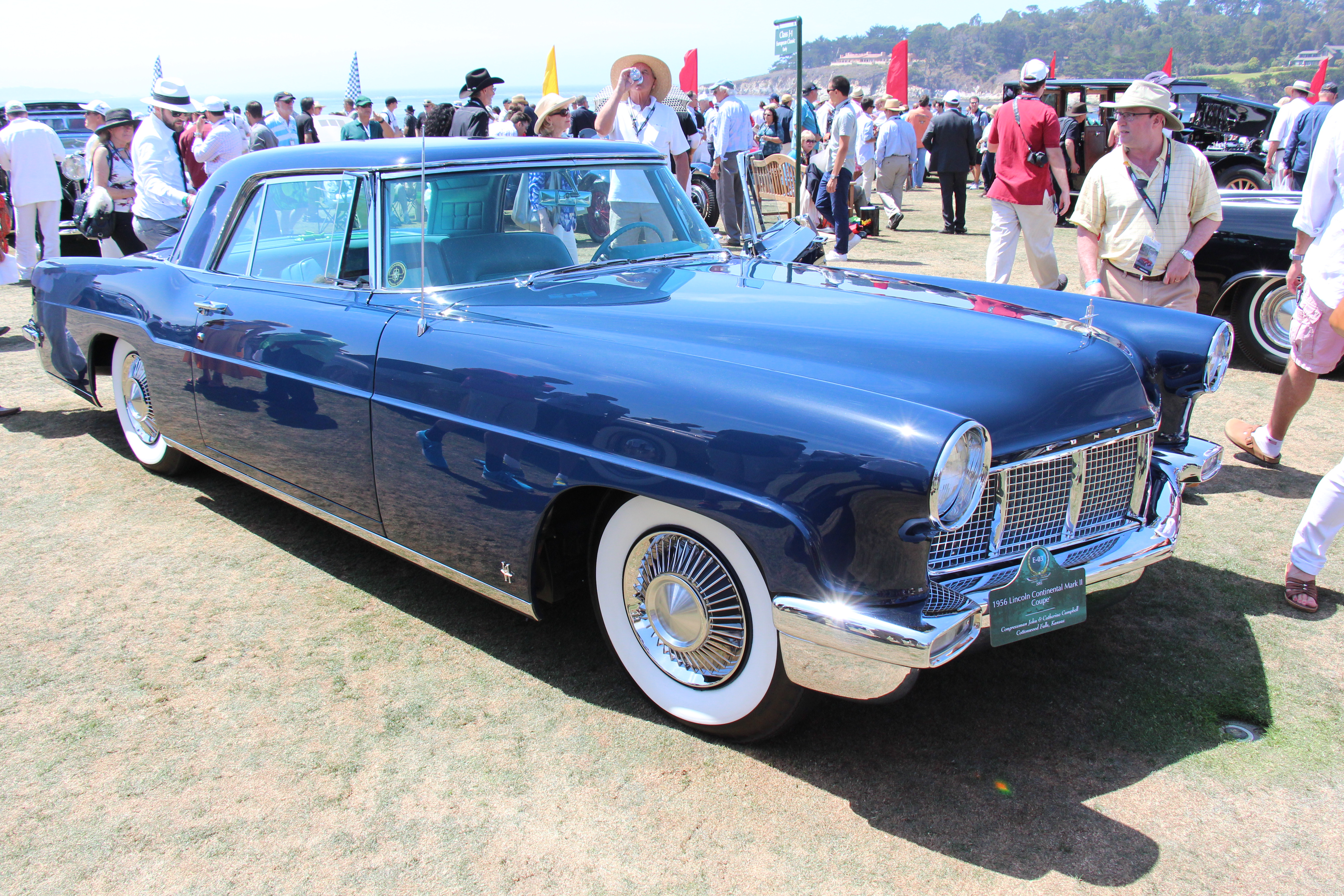
1956 Lincoln Continental

- August 3 - A two-year traffic study resulted in a report recommending construction of 14 new expressways in Detroit totaling 212 miles and costing a billion dollars.
- August 4 - Chrysler president L. L. Colbert and chairman K. T. Keller issued the company's financial report for the first six months of 1955. The company reported all-time records for six months with sales of $1,884,638,006, earnings of $70,010,642, and unit sales of 900,546 cars and trucks (surpassing the prior six-month record of 804,884 cars and trucks).
- August 12 - A delegation of three Russians toured the Ford Rouge plant. After spending the morning touring the assembly line and eating roast beef and potato salad at the plant cafeteria, the Russians were allowed to have a test drive in the soon-to-be-released Lincoln Continental. After the test drive, one of the Russians said, "The engineers who produce Cadillacs are going to have some sleepless nights." A Soviet newspaper reported on the delegation's visit to Detroit: "Residents of Detroit, as in the past, were most hospitable and we were most impressed with what we saw in this dynamic United States city."
- August 14 - The mutilated body of 12-year-old Peter Gorham was found in a swampy area 10 miles north of the Muskegon Boy Scout camp (Camp Wabaningo) where he was last seen on July 5. The boy had been sexually assaulted and shot in the back of his head.
- August 16 - Faced with a waiting list of 1,188 "mentally defective and retarded" children who had been committed to state institutions but for whom hospital beds were unavailable, Gov. Williams asked the Mental Health Department to prepare an emergency program to house them. On October 10, the Department issued the Wagg Report recommending an emergency plan for housing the children and also recommended an additional 3,140 permanent beds. Gov. Williams called the Michigan Legislature into a joint session on November 1, but the Legislature was unable to agree on a bill until December 14, when it adopted a program to establish 1,450 additional beds (approximately 800 at Fort Custer) to be available within four months and 2,500 more beds in a new hospital to be built in southeastern Michigan. The total cost of the plan was placed at $1.2 million.
- August 19 - Ford announced plans to build a new assembly plant on a 325-acre site in Novi Township, for its Lincoln Division. The plant was expected to open in 1957 and to employ between 4,000 and 5,000 workers.
- August 19 - Edgar Guest, known as the People's Poet, celebrated his 60th anniversary with the Detroit Free Press. He began as an office boy, and his first poem appeared in the paper in 1898.
- August 20 - Detroit's first annual Riverama festival began with a tugboat race, a parade of 800 vessels, and a reenactment of Antoine de la Mothe Cadillac's landing at what would become Detroit in 1701.
- August 24 - A political battle over locating a $17-million jet interceptor base came to an end as Secretary of the Air Force Donald Quarles awarded the base to Kalkaska, Michigan. Sites in Benzie County and Cadillac were also considered. The battle pitted Ruth Thompson, whose Ninth Congressional District included Cadillac and Benzie County, and Victor A. Knox, whose Eleventh District included Kalkaska.
- August 25 - Due to the dissolution of Briggs Commercial and Development Company, a company that held the residue from the estate of Walter Briggs Sr., made necessary in order to pay estate taxes, the Detroit Tigers baseball club and Briggs Stadium were announced as being for sale. An offer of $2.5 million by Walter Briggs Jr. for the team and stadium was rejected on September 15 by his four sisters. (The club was ultimately sold in July 1956 to an ownership group that included Fred Knorr and John Fetzer.)
- August 28 - A crowd of 5,000 gathered in what was described as a "carnival" atmosphere to watch a gun battle at 11046 W. Outer Drive between 200 Detroit police officers and Charles Luther Rollins. After a four-hour standoff, the house caught fire, and Rollins ran from the back of the house firing a shotgun. He was killed by multiple shotgun wounds to the head, chest, neck and legs.

=== September ===
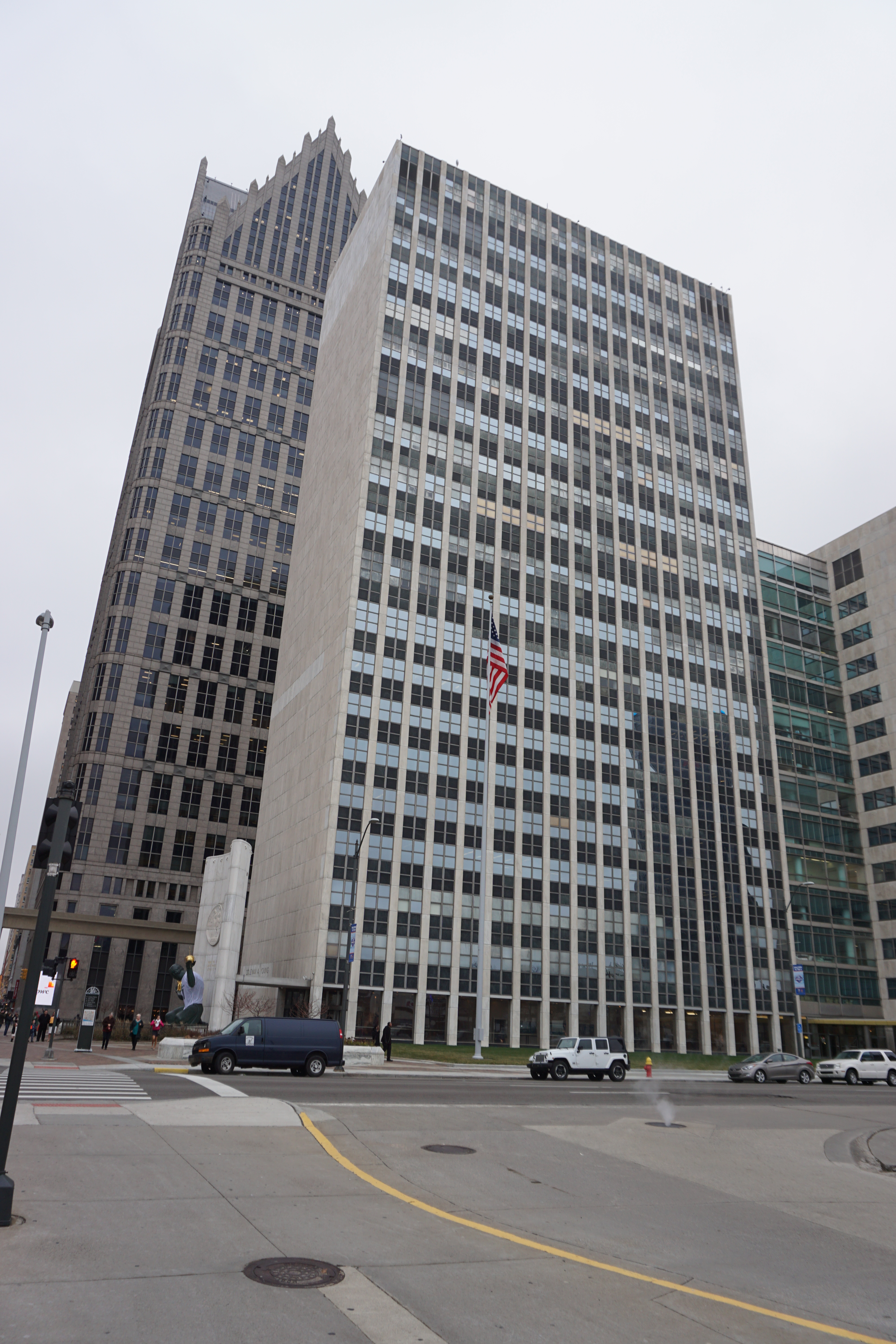
City-County Building dedicated September 23

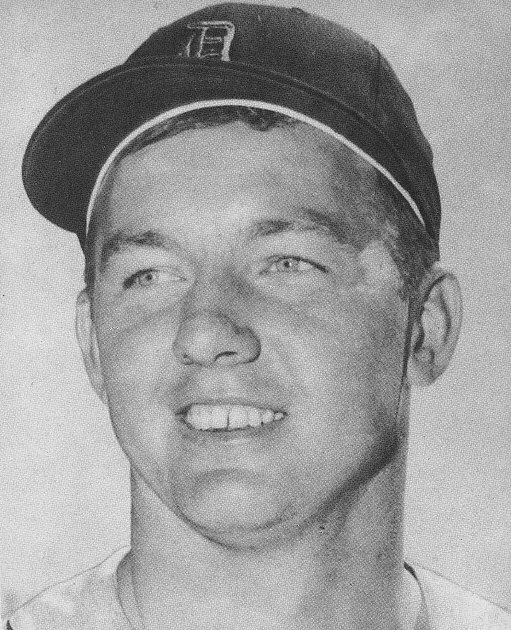
MLB batting champion Al Kaline

- September 1 - Six hours after the UAW's strike deadline had passed, Chrysler and the UAW reached an agreement following the Ford/GM model with 26 weeks of modified GAW payments in the event of a layoff. The Big Three contracts also included union shop provisions requiring all employees within the union's jurisdiction to join the union as a condition of employment. With the Chrysler deal completed, the Detroit Free Press wrote: "It was a bloodless revolution which saw some of the greatest improvements in labor history achieved without a major strike."
- September 2 - The UAW reached a modified GAW agreement with American Motors, although the commencement of the GAW provision would not apply to American Motors for 15 months.
- September 3 - General Motors reversed a prior policy in announcing that, subject to approval of the federal government, it would begin selling automobiles to the Soviet Union and its satellite countries.
- September 12 - Chrysler hosted more than 500 newspaper, radio and television reporters at its proving ground in Chelsea, Michigan. In an elaborate stage presentation titled "Flight '56", company president L. L. "Tex" Colbert a new push-button automatic gear shift, a Highway HiFi record player, and a number of features, including the first seat belts in the industry to comply with aviation safety standards and new safety latches for car doors. Chrysler also previewed its new models featuring descending hood lines and elevated tail fins simulating the lines of a jet aircraft.
- September 13 - During a preview of Ford's new models, Robert McNamara, general manager of the Ford Division, announced that the Ford Division had expanded its production capacity by 250,000 per year. McNamara predicted that employment would remain strong in the auto industry through 1956.
- September 23 - The new City-County Building in downtown Detroit, built at a cost of $26 million, was dedicated in a ceremony attended by Governor G. Mennen Williams, Mayor Albert Cobo, and Council President Louis Miriani. Mayor Cobo said the building would stand as "a beacon for the next hundred years."
- September 25 - After President Eisenhower suffered a heart attack, Detroiters gathered to pray for him in churches and synagogues. Eisenhower's illness also led to optimism as to the Democratic Party's chances of prevailing in the 1956 Presidential election, and the Detroit Free Press reported that Governor Williams' star was brighter as a possible candidate.
- September 30 - Al Kaline was declared the American League batting champion with a .340 batting average. At age 20, he was the youngest batting champion in league history.
- September 30 - At the University of Michigan, 3,000 male students left a pep rally at Ferry Field and conducted a "panty raid" at three girls' dormitories. At Mosher-Jordan, Stockwell, and Alice Lloyd Halls, the raiders "ransacked bureau drawers and clothes closets for panties, slips and bras." The raid led to vandalism as theater marquees were torn down on State Street and "cars pushed through store fronts." The university's dean of men said he did not envision any disciplinary action being taken, because the raids were a "spontaneous thing" with no leader.

=== October ===
- October 8 - Michigan (ranked No. 2 in the AP Poll) defeated Army (ranked No. 6) by a 26–2 score at Michigan Stadium. After the victory, Michigan was ranked No. 1.
- October 26 - General Motors reported record earnings ($913 million) and sales ($9.5 billion) for the first nine months of 1955. It sold more cars and trucks in the first three quarters (3.6 million) than in all of 1954. In the company's quarterly report, Harlow Curtice and Alfred P. Sloan said: "The automobile industry is experiencing the best year in its history. Confidence in progress of the national economy is widespread and the public has the desire and ability to buy."
- October 31 - Voters in Warren Township voted to incorporate as a city by a vote count of 4,142 to 1,537. At the time, Warren Township was growing rapidly from 22,000 in 1940 to 42,000 in 1950 and 58,000 in 1955. The population was principally in the southern part of the township from Eight Mile to Ten Mile Roads and along Van Dyke. The area along Mound Road had become a center for automobile manufacturing with General Motors, Ford, and Chrysler factories and the 823-acre General Motors Technical Center. The existing Village of Warren became a part of the new city. The city covered most of a six-mile square (with a carve-out for the Center Line), making it the third largest city in the state by area, behind only Detroit and Livonia.

=== November ===
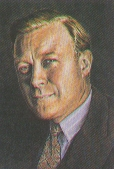
UAW President Walter Reuther

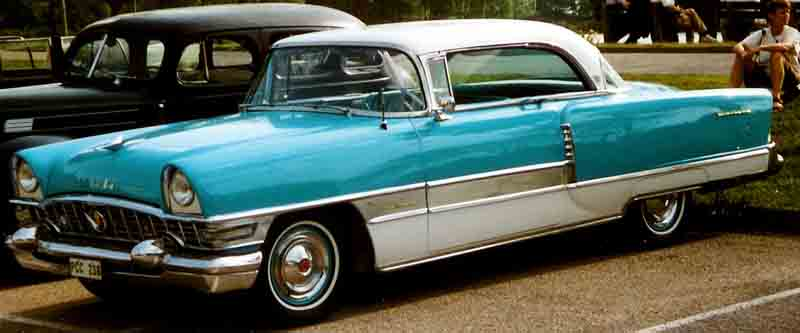
1955 Packard 400

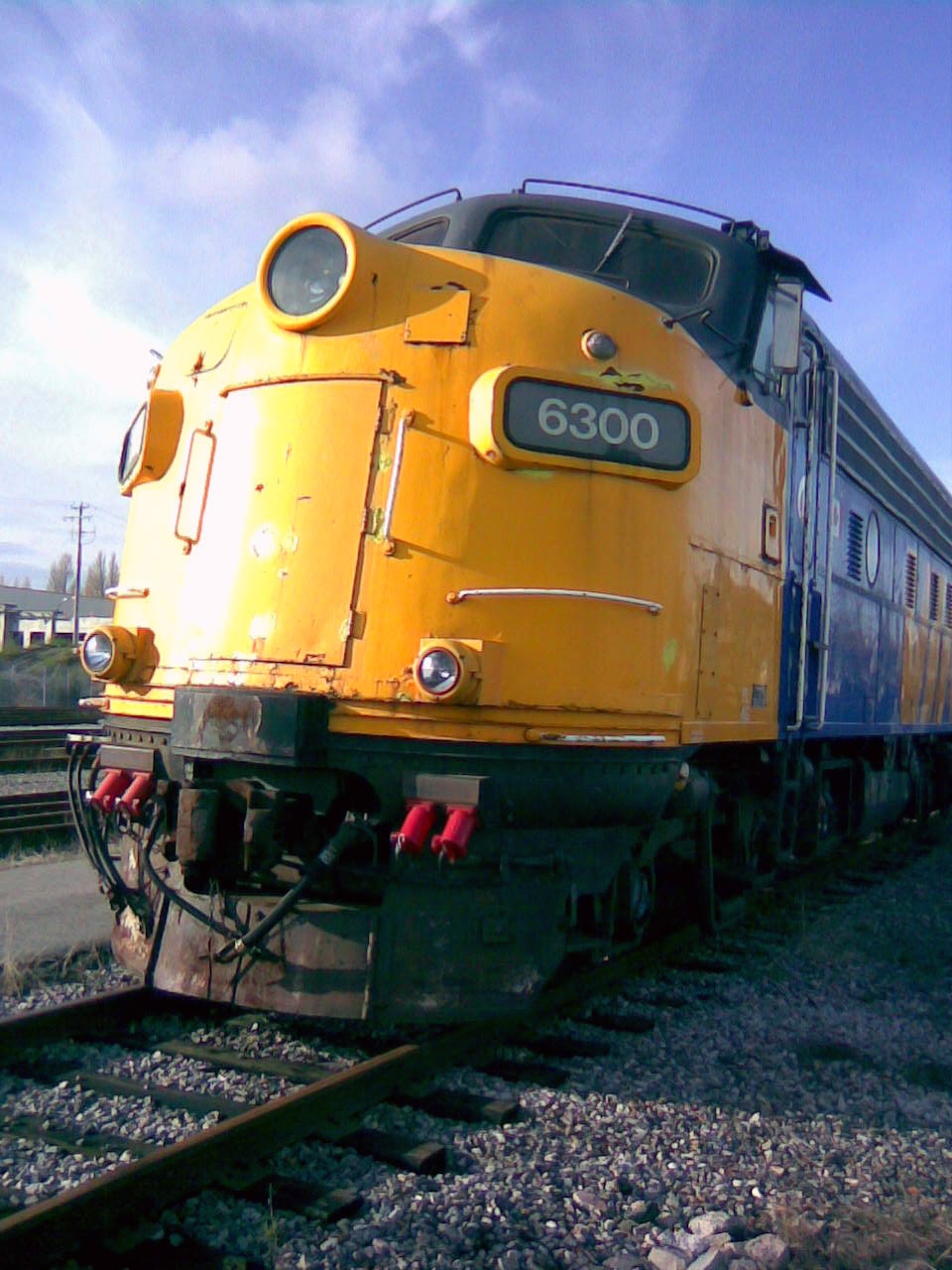
General Motors locomotive

- November 1 - Ford Motor chairman Ernest R. Breech reported that the company's earnings for the first nine months of 1955 exceeded the company's combined earnings for the 21 years before World War II.
- November 5 - Undefeated Michigan, ranked No. 1 in the Coaches' Poll, lost to unranked Illinois, 25–6, in a road game at Champaign, Illinois.
- November 6 - Ford Motor announced that the Ford Foundation would, after a 15-for-1 stock split, sell approximately seven million shares of the company's common stock to the public. The sale was set for early 1956 and was expected to generate $400 million. The sale was the first public offering of Ford stock.
- November 8 - Orville L. Hubbard was elected to his eighth term as Mayor of Dearborn by a vote count of 21,063 to 8,961.
- November 8 - The UAW's GAW campaign suffered a setback when voters in Ohio rejected a ballot proposal to change Ohio law to permit workers to receive supplemental benefits from employers without impacting their right to receive state unemployment benefits. The campaign against the ballot proposal was led by the Ohio Chamber of Commerce and Ohio Manufacturers Association and featured an "anti-Reuther" theme, describing UAW president Walter Reuther as a "wild and unstable salesman" trying to gain power for himself at the expense of the state's economic development.
- November 9 - The UAW signed a new three-year contract with Studebaker-Packard covering 9,000 employees in the Detroit area. The contract followed the modified GAW pattern established with Ford and GM.
- November 9 - Representatives of the nation's locomotive manufacturers appeared before the U.S. Senate Antitrust Subcommittee concerning General Motors' increased dominance in that industry. They complained that the U.S. government had favored GM during World War II and that GM had made 60% of the diesel locomotives purchased by railroads since the war.
- November 10 - Chrysler President L. L. Colbert announced a five-year, $1 billion expansion program, including an East Coast assembly plant and research and development on gas turbine engines, electronics, and nuclear and solar energy.
- November 11 - Gov. G. Mennen Williams signed a bill passed at a special joint session of the Michigan Legislature enacting a maximum speed limit of 65 miles per hour in the daytime and 55 miles per hour at nighttime. Michigan had not had a speed limit law in effect since 1927. The law was set to be effective February 3, 1956.
- November 14 - Detroit Police Commissioner Edward S. Piggins said his officers would begin using unmarked cars to patrol Detroit's freeways to control speeding and reckless driving. In the first day of such patrols, three unmarked cars issued 85 tickets in 15 hours.
- November 17 - Ten persons, mostly hunters, died in a winter storm. Two of the men died while duck hunting on a Lake Erie marsh. Fred LaPointe, a 51-year-old Dearborn, man became stuck in quicksand, and Edward Kocher, an 18-year-old Detroit man, went to his rescue. Both were "engulfed in quicksand up to their necks and froze to death in the howling gale." Maurice Kocher, father of the 18-year-old, escaped injury by waiting six hours for the mud to freeze and crawling to the shore on his stomach. By the end of the first week of hunting season, 32 hunters had died.
- November 19 - Michigan lost to Ohio State, 17-0, and Michigan State received the Big Ten Conference bid to play in the Rose Bowl on New Year's Day. The final two minutes of the Michigan-Ohio State game became a free-for-all, as Michigan player were penalized eight time and Michigan players Ron Kramer and Al Sigman were ejected. After what was called "the most shameful incident in Michigan's football history," head coach Bennie Oosterbaan and athletic director Fritz Crisler publicly apologized to Ohio State.

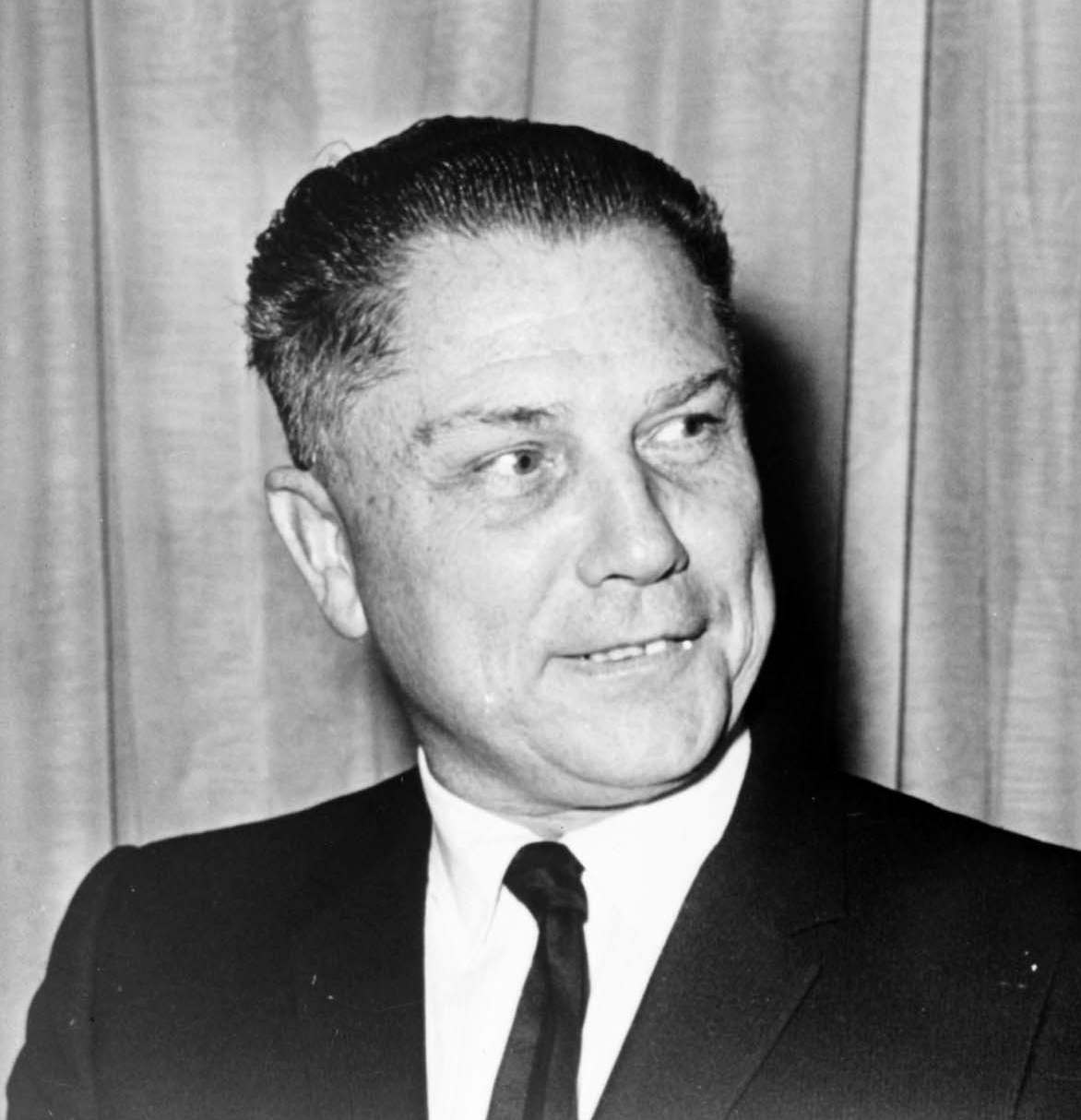
Jimmy Hoffa

- November 24 - The Detroit Lions defeated the Green Bay Packers, 24-10, on Thanksgiving Day before 51,685 spectators at Briggs Stadium in Detroit. Detroit's Lew Carpenter ran 49 yards for a touchdown, and Sonny Gandee returned an interception 46 yards for another touchdown.
- November 27 - Jimmy Hoffa, head of the Teamster's Central Council representing the Midwest, negotiated a "mutual assistance" pact with the longshoremen's union. Hoffa at age 42 was described at the time as the "heir apparent" of the Teamsters union, an "iron-fisted", "colorful", and "violent" leader who "lets nothing stand in his way."

=== December ===
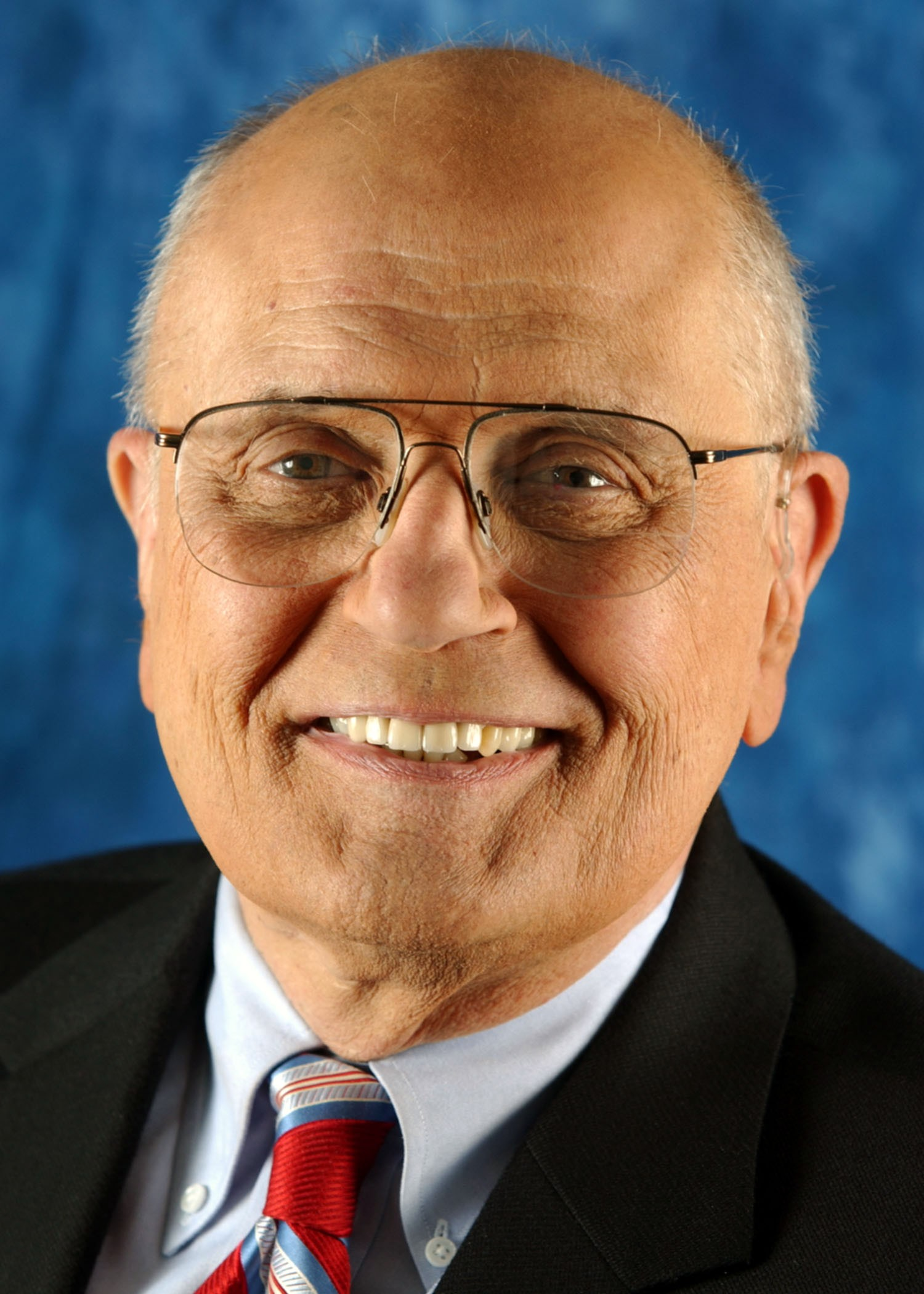
John Dingell was first elected in December 1955

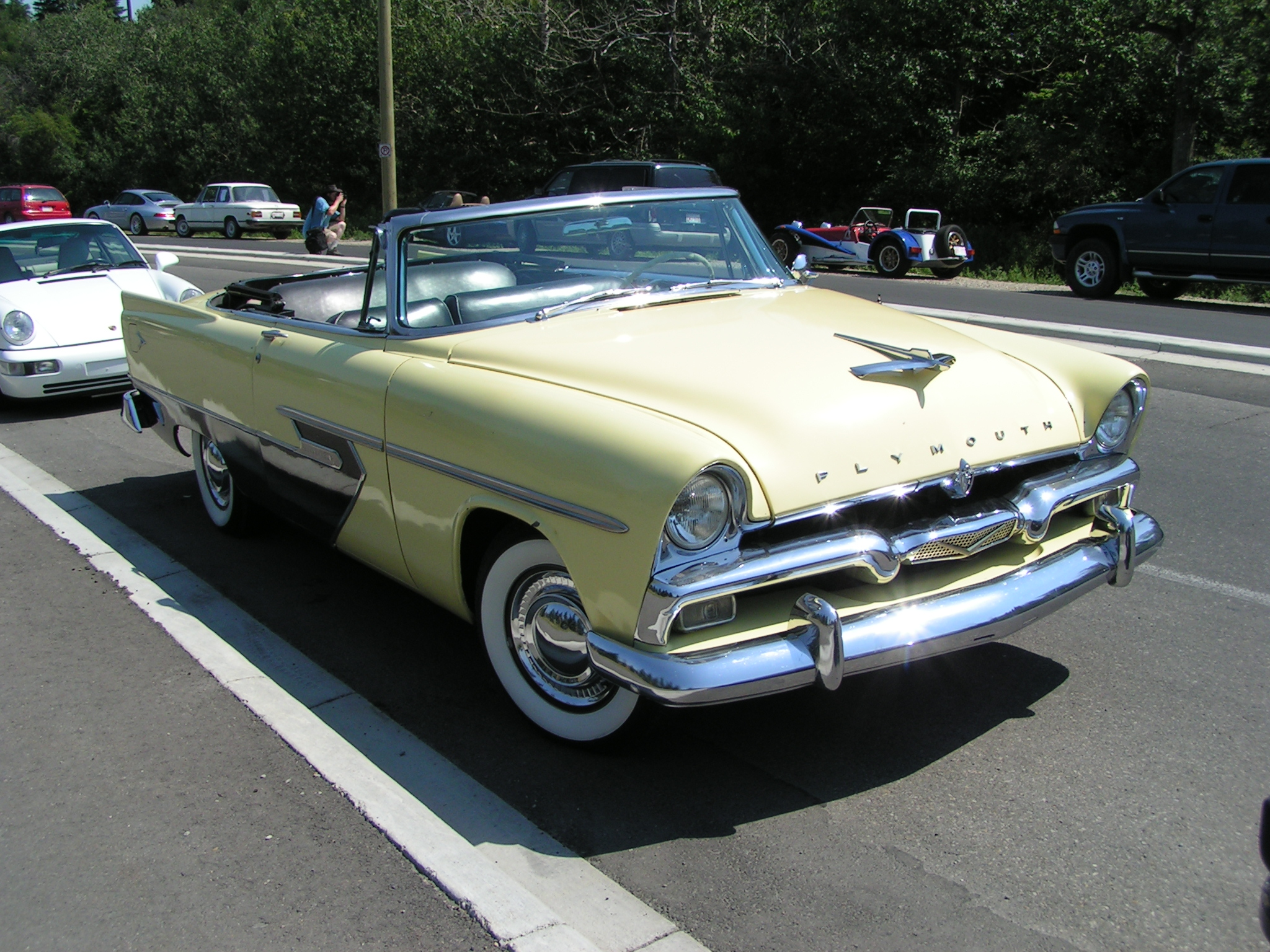
1956 Plymouth

- December 1 - The Stereotypers Union No. 9 went on strike against Detroit's three major newspapers, The Detroit News, Detroit Free Press, and Detroit Times. All three papers were shut down. On December 3, workers from the three papers began publishing a temporary newspaper called The Detroit Reporter. The strike lasted 46 days, and the city's newspapers resumed publication on January 17, 1956.
- December 2 - Mayor Cobo ordered the DSR to convert its Woodward and Gratiot lines from streetcars to buses as soon as possible. On December 14, the DSR Commission executed a contract to sell the city's 183 streetcars to Mexico City for approximately $700,000 -- $4,000 each for 133 newer streetcars and $3,000 each for 33 older models. DSR planned to then buy 130 new buses for $2.6 million to operate on Gratiot and Woodward by the spring of 1956. It projected that service would be increased by 25% with buses replacing streetcars on the Gratiot and Woodward lines. While lack of profitability had been a justification for terminating streetcar service, the DSR reported on December 21 that it had recorded a profit for the five months ending in November and that ridership was up for the first time in 10 years. The DSR during this time carried a daily load of 608,995 with 175,000 miles logged each day.
- December 13 - Following the death of his father on September 19, John Dingell Jr. was elected to his father's seat in Michigan's 15th Congressional District. Dingell and his father, John D. Dingell Sr., represented Michigan in Congress for a combined run of 82 years—the father from 1933 to 1955 and the son from 1955 to 2015.
- December 14 - A commission appointed by the Governor unanimously recommended that the State of Michigan take over Wayne University. Up to that time, Wayne had been operated by the Detroit Board of Education. Governor Williams said the recommendation seemed "wise and realistic."
- December 16 - Chrysler laid off 1,400 workers, mostly at the Mack plant that made Plymouth vehicles. A UAW local leader protested the company's "cruel and inhuman attitude", blamed the company's production "bungling" for the layoffs, asserted that "Chrysler management has a cash register for a heart", and called on the company to cancel the layoffs to save Christmas for the 1,400 impacted families. The company responded that the 1,400 workers were temporary workers hired to meet heightened demand for 1956 models and were no longer needed since dealer stocks were approaching acceptable levels.

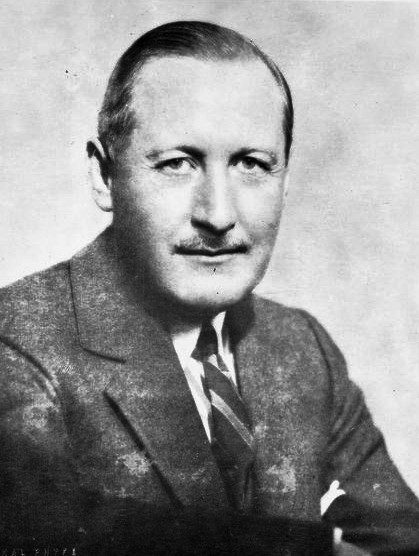
Time Man of the Year Harlow Curtice

- December 21 - Ford Motor announced that its 11 top executives would receive $3.3 million ($2.4 million in salaries and approximately $900,000 in stock dividends) for their services in 1955, plus $8 million in "accumulated credits" (a supplemental compensation system paid after termination of employment) to be paid at a later time. Henry Ford II and Ernest Breech were the highest paid executives with salaries of $321,000 and $925,000 each in accumulated credits. Ford also disclosed the same day, as part of a filing for its first public stock offering scheduled for January, that its net income for the first nine months of 1955 was $312 million.
- December 26 - A fire at Edgewater Park, a 20-acre amusement park at Grand River and Seven Mile Road in Detroit, destroyed the large arcade building and part of the roller coaster structure. The flames rose 100 feet into the air, and smoke was visible from 10 miles. Arson was suspected as the cause.
- December 27 - General Motors CEO Harlow Curtice was selected as Time Man of the Year. Time wrote that it chose Curtice "because of his leadership in the free, competitive, expanding American economy that is the keystone of the defense of the West against the Communist world."

== Births ==
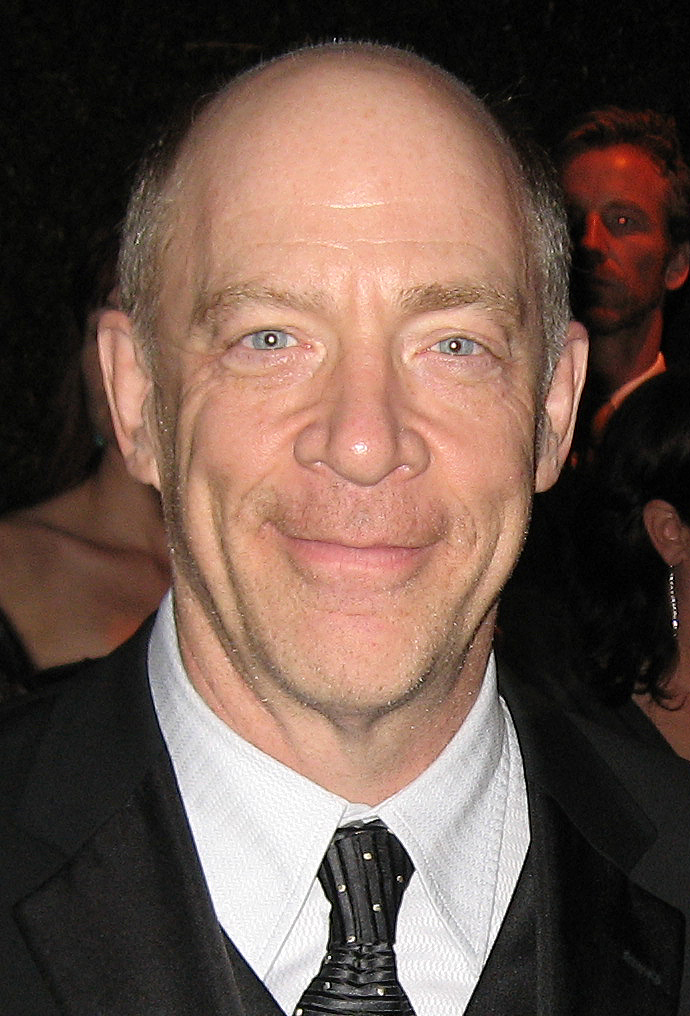
J. K. Simmons

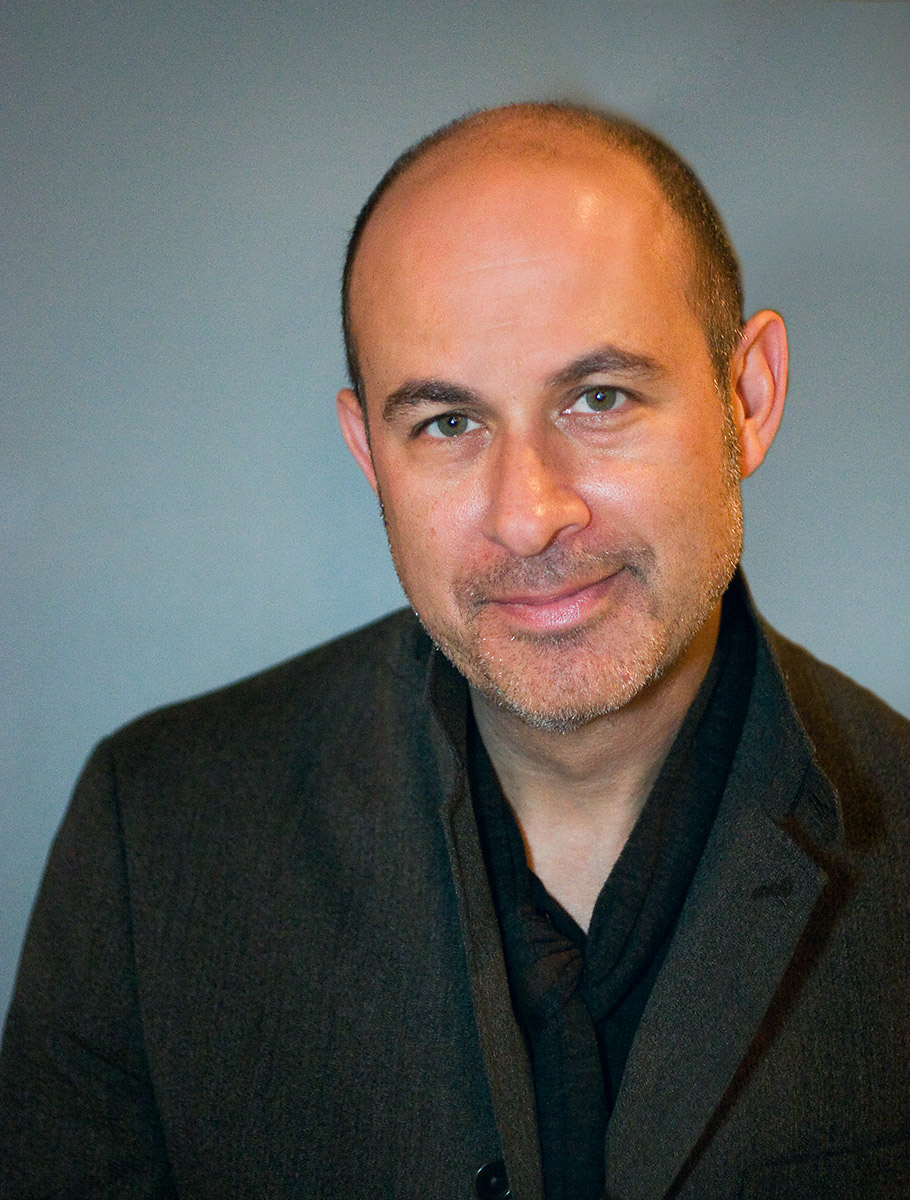
John Varvatos

- January 1 - Bob Owchinko, Major League Baseball pitcher (1976–1986), in Detroit
- January 8 - Ruth Johnson, Michigan Secretary of State (2011-2019), in Holly, Michigan
- January 9 - J. K. Simmons, Academy Award-winning actor (Whiplash, Law & Order), in Grosse Pointe, Michigan
- January 16 - Jerry M. Linenger, Space Shuttle and Space Station Mir astronaut, in East Detroit, Michigan
- January 30 - Tom Izzo, men's basketball coach for Michigan State since 1995, in Iron Mountain, Michigan
- February 2 - Kim Zimmer, actress (Reva Shayne on Guiding Light, 4x Daytime Emmy Award for Outstanding Lead Actress in a Drama Series, in Grand Rapids, Michigan
- February 6 - Eric Money, professional basketball player (1974-1980), in Detroit
- March 1 - Danny Schmitz, head baseball coach at Bowling Green since 1991, in Detroit
- March 15 - Bunny DeBarge, singer–songwriter and the lone female sibling of the Motown family group DeBarge, in Detroit
- Apri 1 - Terry Nichols, conspirator in Oklahoma City bombing plot, in Lapeer
- May 7 - Ben Poquette, professional basketball player in the NBA (1977-1987), in Ann Arbor, Michigan
- May 14 - Robert Tapert, film and television producer (The Evil Dead, Darkman, Xena: Warrior Princess), in Royal Oak, Michigan
- May 28 - Mark Howe, professional hockey player (1973-1995) and son of Gordie Howe, in Detroit
- June 6 - Sandra Bernhard, model, actress, comedian, singer and author, in Flint, Michigan
- June 22 - Jeff Jackson, head hockey coach for Lake Superior State (1990–1996) and Notre Dame (2005–Present), in Roseville, Michigan
- August - Newton Thomas Sigel, cinematographer (Three Kings, X-Men, X-Men: Apocalypse), in Detroit
- August 1 - Kirk Ferentz, head football coach of Iowa since 1999, in Royal Oak, Michigan
- August 8 - John Varvatos, menswear designer, in Detroit
- August 23 - James Hynes, novelist (Next), in Okemos, Michigan
- September 18 - Greg Meyer, long-distance runner and the last American to win the Boston Marathon, in Grand Rapids, Michigan
- October 4 - Lary Sorensen, Major League Baseball pitcher (1977-1988), in Detroit
- November 4 - Steve Mariucci, head football coach of the San Francisco 49ers (1997–2002) and Detroit Lions (2003–2005), in Iron Mountain, Michigan
- unknown date - Beth E. Mooney, first woman CEO of a top-20 U.S. bank (KeyCorp), in Midland, Michigan

=== Gallery of 1955 births ===
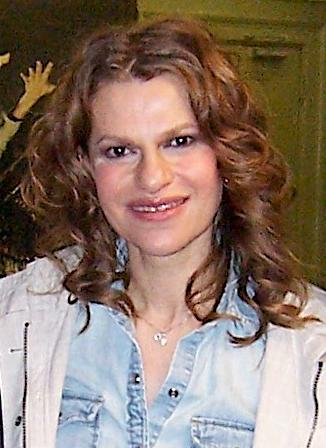
Sandra Bernhard

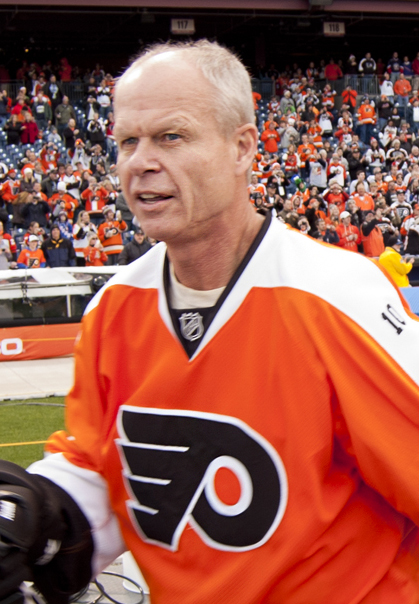
Mark Howe

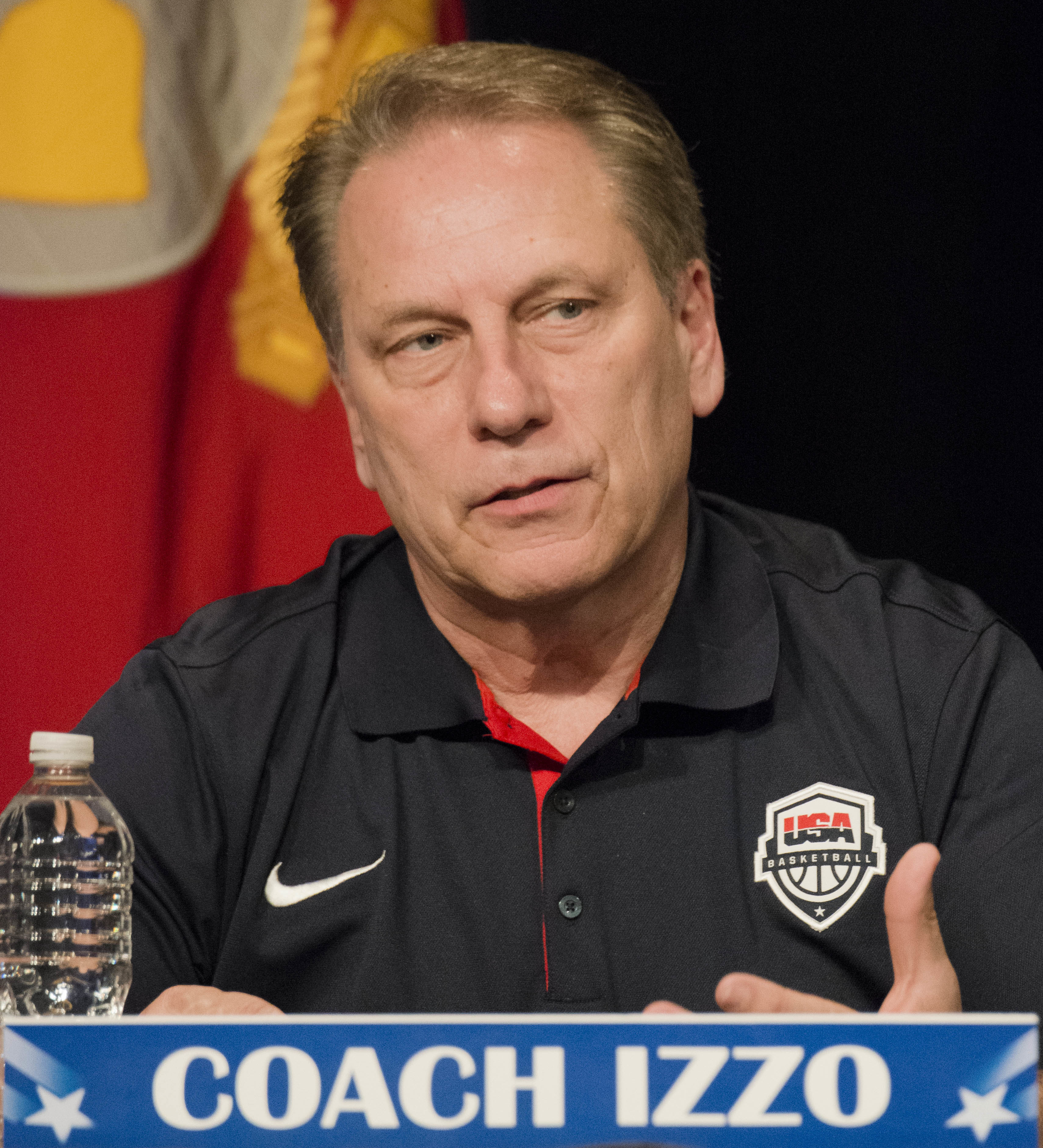
Tom Izzo

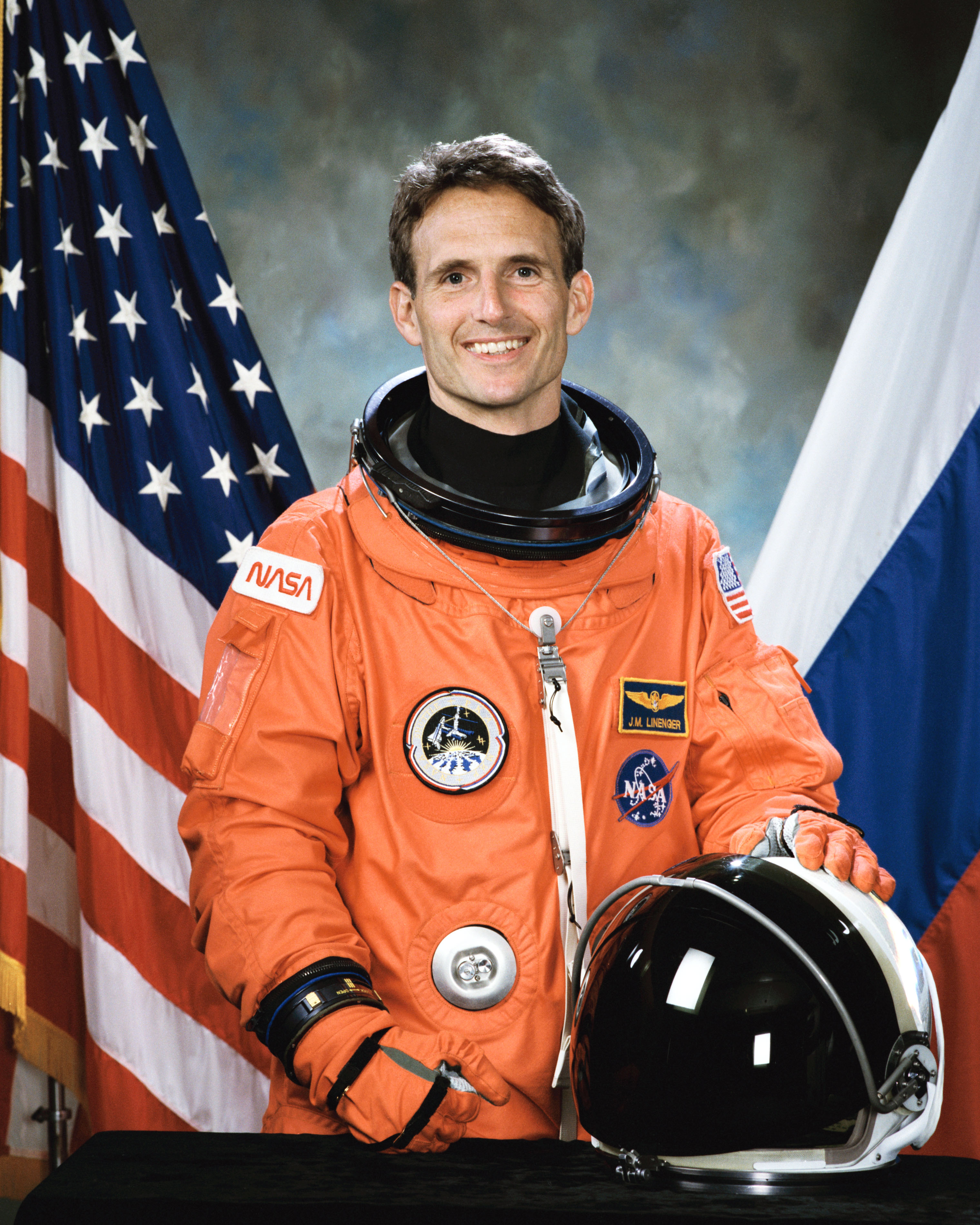
Jerry Linenger

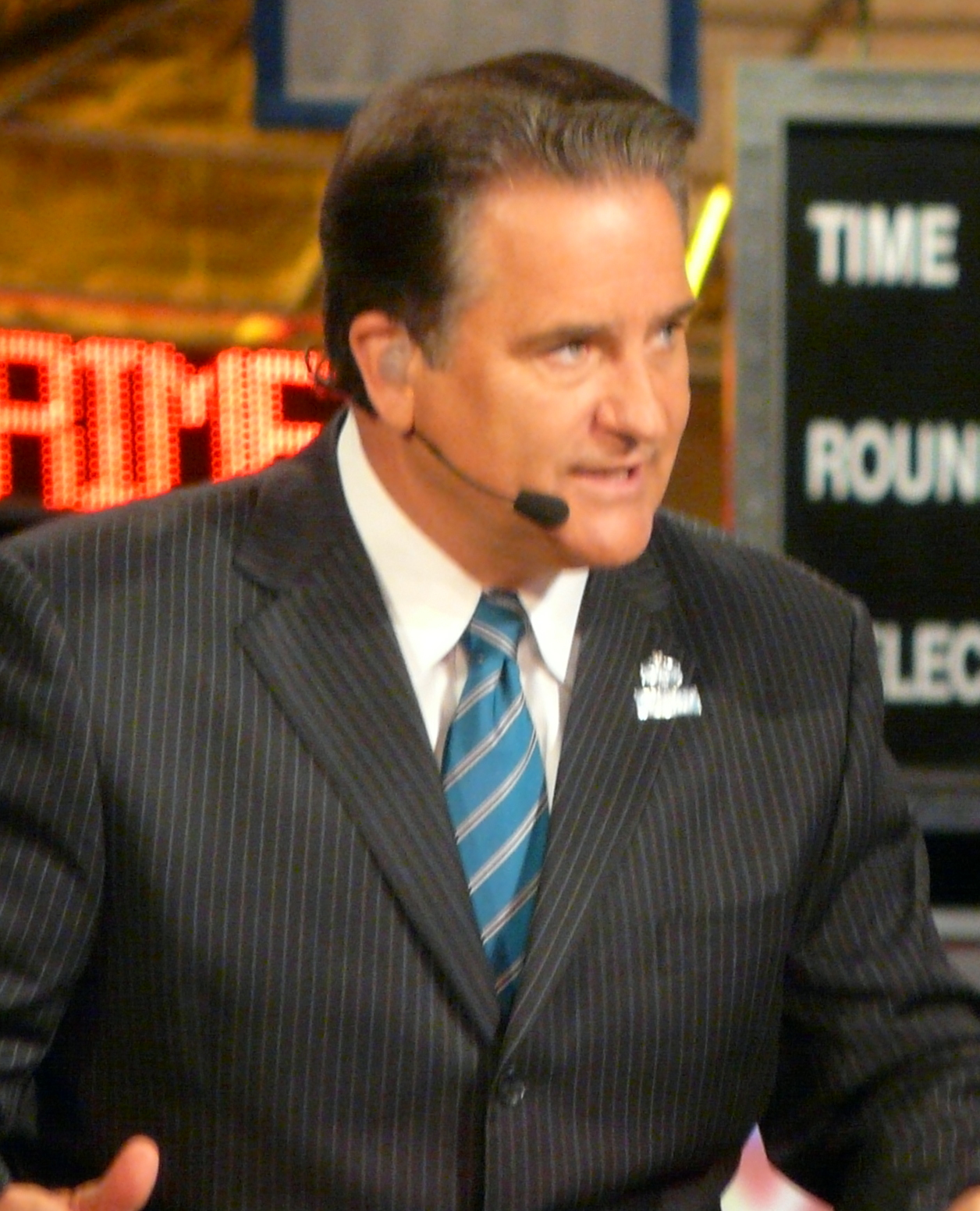
Steve Mariucci

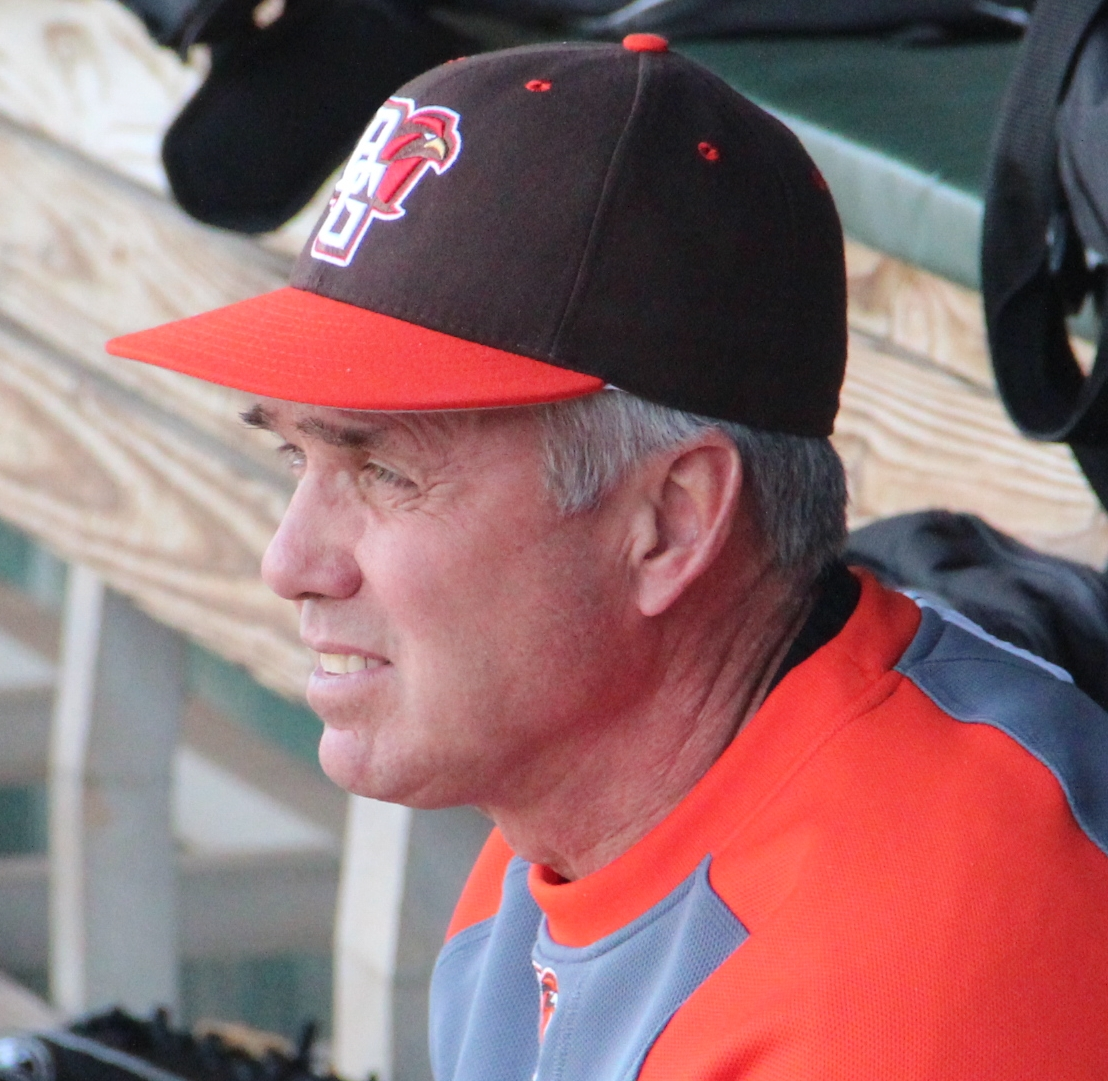
Danny Schmitz

== Deaths ==
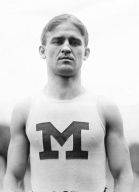
Archie Hahn

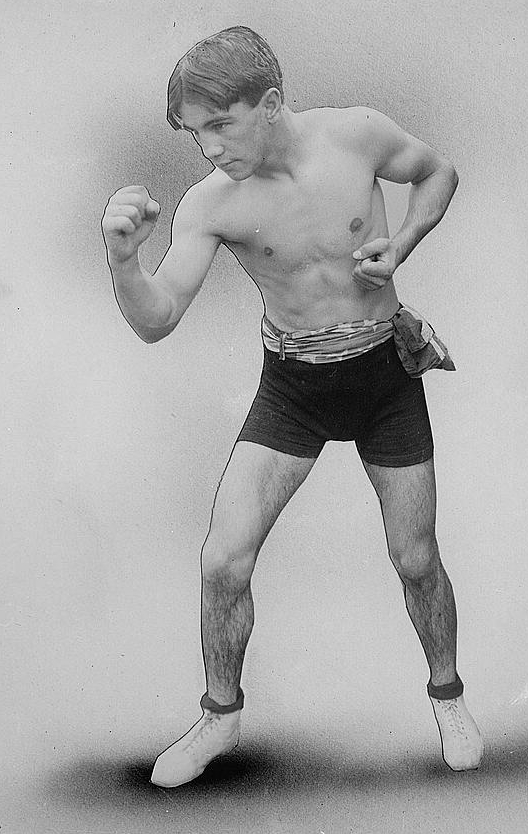
Ad Wolgast

- January 15 - Daniel A. Lord, Roman Catholic priest and writer, creator of the City of Freedom pageant for Detroit's 250th anniversary in 1951, at age 66 in St. Louis, Missouri
- January 21 - Archie Hahn, sprinter at University of Michigan who won four gold medals at 1904 and 1906 Olympics, at age 74 in Charlottesville, Virginia
- February 19 - William Warner Bishop, director of University of Michigan libraries (1915-1941) and author/expert in the field of library science, at age 83 in Ann Arbor, Michigan
- March 7 - Gaskell Romney, father of George W. Romney and grandfather of Mitt Romney, in Salt Lake City, Utah
- April 14 - Ad Wolgast, boxer known as the "Michigan Wildcat", world lightweight champion, at age 67 in a mental hospital in Camarillo, California
- June 4 - John McLean, football player and coach, track athlete, and silver medalist in hurdles at 1900 Olympics, at age 77
- June 13 - Bartel J. Jonkman, Congressman from Michigan's 5th District (1940-1949), at age 71 in Grand Rapids, Michigan
- August 10 - Jane Murfin, Michigan native, playwright (Smilin' Through]), and Academy Award nominated screenwriter (What Price Hollywood? and the Strongheart movies), at age 70 in Brentwood, Los Angeles, California
- August 29 - Francis X. Martel, president of the Detroit and Wayne County American Federation of Labor (AFL) for 36 years, at age 66 at the Grand Hotel on Mackinac Island.
- September 9 - Harry S. Toy, former Wayne County Prosecutor (1930-1935), Michigan Attorney General (1935-1937), Michigan Supreme Court (1937-1938), at age 63 in Detroit
- September 19 - John D. Dingell Sr., Congressman from Michigan's 15th District (1933-1955) and senior Democrat on the House Ways and Means Committee, at age 61 in Washington, D.C.
- September 19 - Carl Milles, sculptor in residence at Cranbrook from 1929 to 1945, at age 80 near Stockholm, Sweden
- October 7 - Jack Gibson, founder of the first fully professional hockey league, the IPHL, in northern Michigan, at age 75
- October 8 - Sumner Myers, professor and mathematician who specialized in topology, at age 45 of a heart attack while attending a Michigan football game in Ann Arbor
- November 29 - Rene Paul Chambellan, architectural sculptor whose work includes the Charity Crucifixion Tower at the National Shrine of the Little Flower in Royal Oak, at age 62 in Jersey City, New Jersey
- December 12 - Frank Culver, All-American lineman at Michigan, 1917 and 1919, at age 58 in Detroit

=== Gallery of 1955 deaths ===
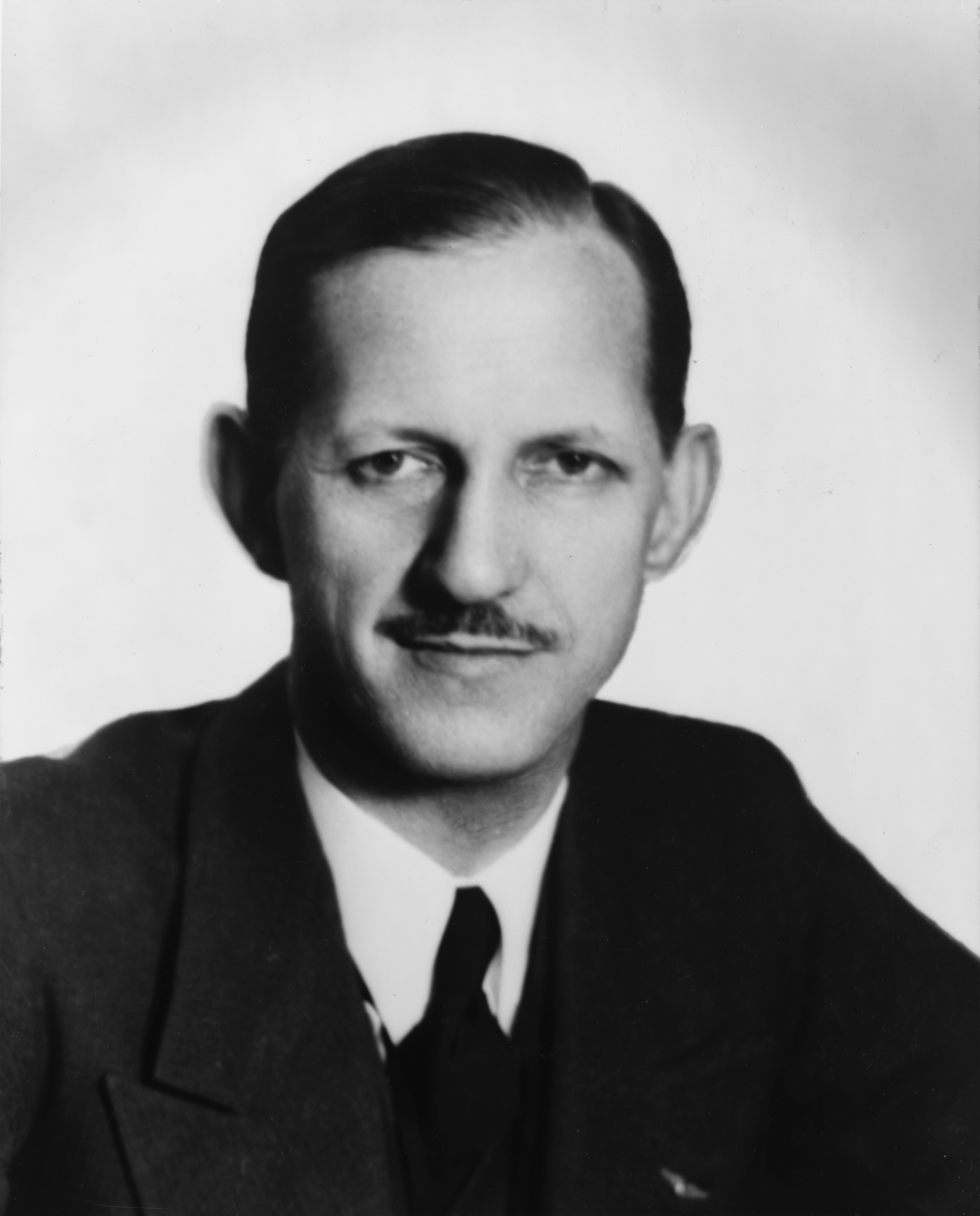
John D. Dingell Sr.

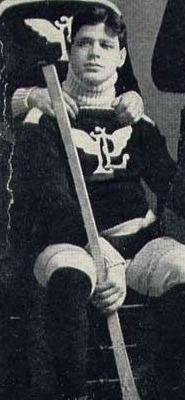
Jack Gibson

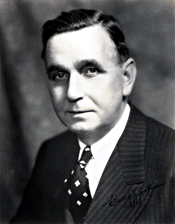
Bartel J. Jonkman

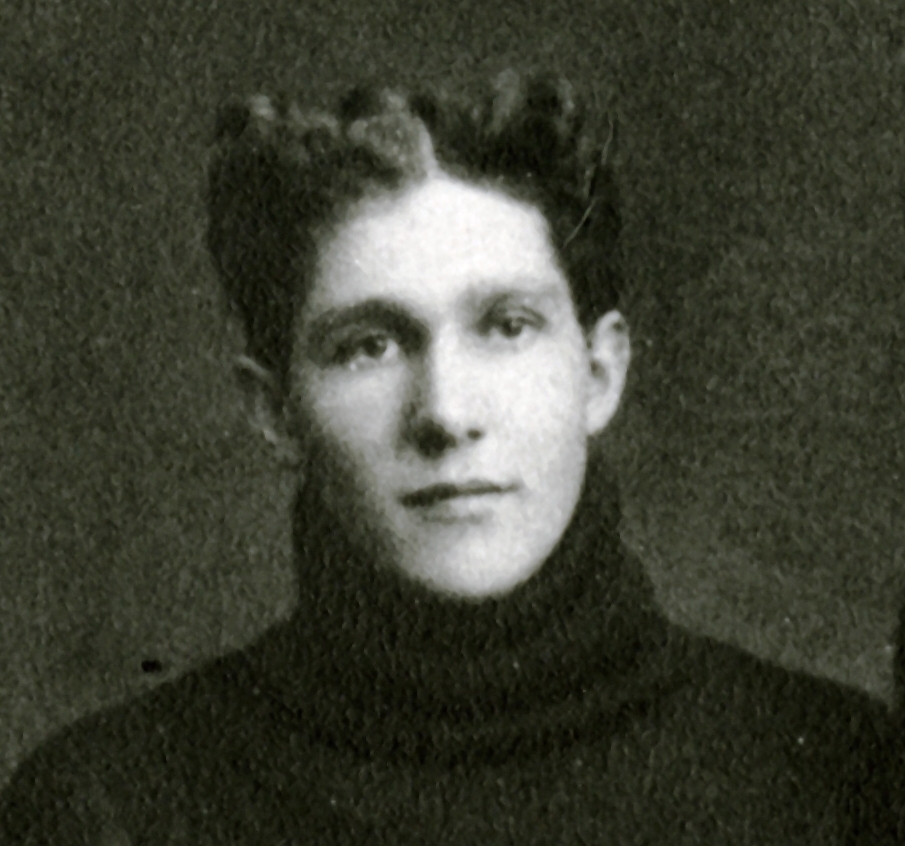
John McLean

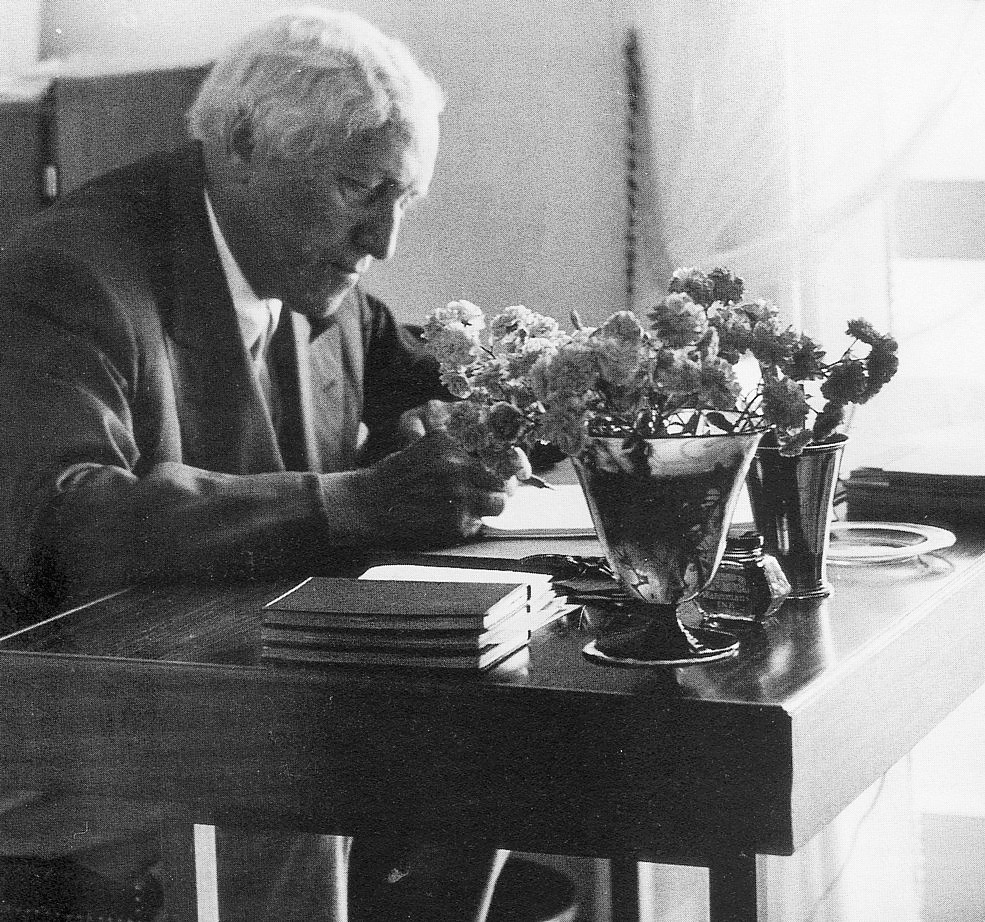
Carl Milles

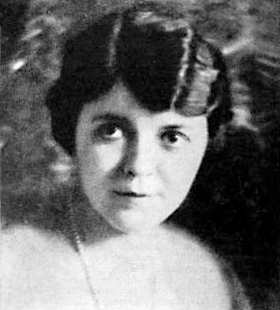
Jane Murfin

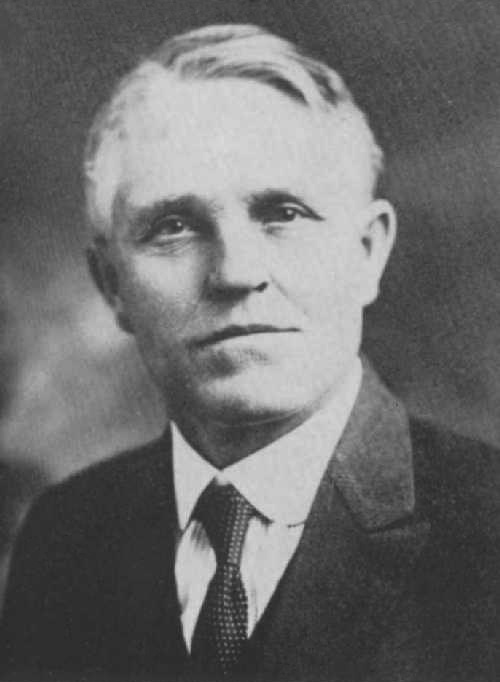
Gaskell Romney

== See also ==
- History of Michigan
- History of Detroit
