= 1954 in Michigan =

- Decades: 1930s; 1940s; 1950s; 1960s; 1970s
- See also: History of Michigan; Historical outline of Michigan; List of years in Michigan; 1954 in the United States

Events from the year 1954 in Michigan.

== Top stories ==
The Associated Press United Press and Detroit Free Press, each separately ranked the state's top news stories of 1954 as follows:

- Democrat election victory. Landslide victory by Democrats in the November election, including Patrick V. McNamara's defeat of U.S. Senator Homer Ferguson and Governor G. Mennen Williams' election to a fourth term (AP#1, 217 points; UP#1; DFP#1)
- Mackinac Bridge. The start of construction on the Mackinac Bridge (AP#2, 162 points; UP#2; DFP#10)
- Small acquittal. The acquittal of Dr. Kenneth Small on charges that he murdered New York playboy Jules Lack, who was having an affair with Small's wife, at a Lake Michigan vacation home near Douglas, Michigan (AP#3, 153 points; UP#3; DFP#2)
- Death of Sen. Moody. On July 20 death, U.S. Senator Blair Moody died from chronic viral pneumonia and heart failure at University Hospital in Ann Arbor at age 52 (AP#4; DFP#5)
- Escape from Jackson. The escape of 13 inmates, with two women as hostages, from Michigan State Prison in Jackson (AP#5)
- State equalization. A decision of the Michigan Supreme Court making state equalization the basis for local property taxes (AP#6)
- Donald Ritchie. Donald Ritchie's false confession to the 1948 attempted assassination of Walter Reuther (AP#7; DFP#6)
- Automotive merger. The merger of independent automobile makers, including Studebaker, Packard, and Hudson, to become more competitive with the Big Three (AP#8; DFP#3)
- Bingo vote. The November 2 vote against legalizing bingo (AP#9)
- "Bird dog" controversy. Secretary of Defense C.E. Wilson's drew criticism for his October 11 comments about unemployment: "I have always liked bird dogs better than kennel-fed dogs. The bird dog is one that will go out and hunt for its food. The kennel-fed dog is one that waits until it is brought to him. (AP#10; DFP#8)
- Automobile production race, including Chrysler "face-lifting" (DFP#4)
- Judge John P. O'Hara's grand jury investigation of police (DFP#7)
- The murder of a four-year-old girl by 15-year-old Terrance DeMoss (DFP#9)

== Office holders ==
=== State office holders ===
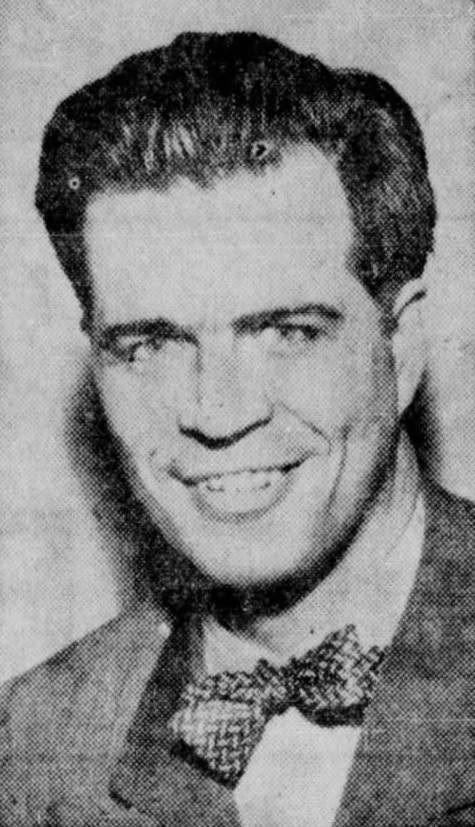
Gov. G. Mennen Williams

- Governor of Michigan: G. Mennen Williams (Democrat)
- Lieutenant Governor of Michigan: Clarence A. Reid (Republican)
- Michigan Attorney General: Frank Millard (Republican)
- Michigan Secretary of State: Owen Cleary (Republican)
- Speaker of the Michigan House of Representatives: Wade Van Valkenburg (Republican)
- Chief Justice, Michigan Supreme Court: Henry M. Butzel

=== Mayors of major cities ===
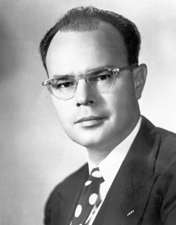
Sen. Charles Potter

- Mayor of Detroit: Albert Cobo (Republican)
- Mayor of Grand Rapids: Paul G. Goebel/George Veldman
- Mayor of Flint: Donald W. Riegle Sr./George M. Algoe
- Mayor of Saginaw: George H. Fischer
- Mayor of Dearborn: Orville L. Hubbard
- Mayor of Lansing: Ralph Crego
- Mayor of Ann Arbor: William E. Brown Jr.

=== Federal office holders ===
- U.S. Senator from Michigan: Homer S. Ferguson (Republican)
- U.S. Senator from Michigan: Charles E. Potter (Republican)
- House District 1: Thaddeus M. Machrowicz (Democrat)
- House District 2: George Meader (Republican)
- House District 3: Paul W. Shafer (Republican)
- House District 4: Clare Hoffman (Republican)
- House District 5: Gerald Ford (Republican)
- House District 6: Kit Clardy (Republican)
- House District 7: Jesse P. Wolcott (Republican)
- House District 8: Alvin Morell Bentley (Republican)
- House District 9: Ruth Thompson (Republican)
- House District 10: Elford Albin Cederberg (Republican)
- House District 11: Victor A. Knox (Republican)
- House District 12: John B. Bennett (Republican)
- House District 13: George D. O'Brien (Democrat)
- House District 14: Louis C. Rabaut (Democrat)
- House District 15: John Dingell Sr. (Democrat)
- House District 16: John Lesinski Jr. (Democrat)
- House District 17: Charles G. Oakman (Republican)
- House District 18: George Anthony Dondero (Republican)

== Population ==
In the 1950 United States census, Michigan was recorded as having a population of 6,421,000 persons, ranking as the seventh most populous state in the country. By 1960, the state's population had grown 22.8% to 7,823,194 persons.

=== Cities ===
The following is a list of cities in Michigan with a population of at least 40,000 based on 1950 U.S. Census data. Historic census data from 1940 and 1960 is included to reflect trends in population increases or decreases. Cities that are part of the Detroit metropolitan area are shaded in tan.

1950 Rank	City	County	1940 Pop.	1950 Pop.	1960 Pop.	Change 1950-60
1	Detroit	Wayne	1,623,452	1,849,568	1,670,144	−9.7%
2	Grand Rapids	Kent	164,292	176,515	177,313	0.5%
3	Flint	Genesee	151,543	163,143	196,940	20.7%
4	Dearborn	Wayne	63,589	94,994	112,007	17.9%
5	Saginaw	Saginaw	82,794	92,918	98,265	5.8%
6	Lansing	Ingham	78,753	92,129	107,807	17.0%
7	Pontiac	Oakland	66,626	73,681	82,233	11.6%
8	Kalamazoo	Kalamazoo	54,097	57,704	82,089	42.4%
9	Bay City	Bay	47,956	52,523	53,604	2.1%
10	Jackson	Jackson	49,656	51,088	50,720	−0.7%
11	Battle Creek	Calhoun	43,453	48,666	44,169	−9.2%
12	Muskegon	Muskegon	47,697	48,429	46,485	−4.0%
13	Ann Arbor	Washtenaw	29,815	48,251	67,340	39.6%
14	Royal Oak	Oakland	25,087	46,898	80,612	71.9%
15	Warren	Macomb	23,658	42,653	89,246	109.2%

=== Counties ===
The following is a list of counties in Michigan with populations of at least 100,000 based on 1950 U.S. Census data. Historic census data from 1940 and 1960 are included to reflect trends in population increases or decreases. Counties that are part of the Detroit metropolitan area are shaded in tan.

1980 Rank	County	Largest city	1940 Pop.	1950 Pop.	1960 Pop.	Change 1950-60
1	Wayne	Detroit	2,015,623	2,435,235	2,666,297	9.5%
2	Oakland	Pontiac	254,068	396,001	690,259	74.3%
3	Kent	Grand Rapids	246,338	288,292	363,187	26.0%
4	Genesee	Flint	227,944	270,963	374,313	38.1%
5	Macomb	Warren	107,638	184,961	405,804	119.4%
6	Ingham	Lansing	130,616	172,941	211,296	22.2%
7	Saginaw	Saginaw	130,468	153,515	190,752	24.3%
8	Washtenaw	Ann Arbor	80,810	134,606	172,440	28.1%
9	Kalamazoo	Kalamazoo	100,085	126,707	169,712	33.9%
10	Muskegon	Muskegon	94,501	121,545	129,943	6.9%
11	Calhoun	Battle Creek	94,206	120,813	138,858	14.9%
12	Berrien	Benton Harbor	89,117	115,702	149,865	29.5%
13	Jackson	Jackson	93,108	108,168	131,994	22.0%

== Sports ==
=== Baseball ===
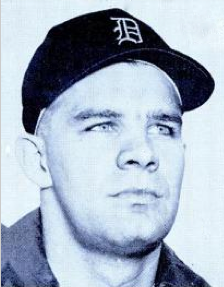
Harvey Kuenn

- 1954 Detroit Tigers season – Under manager Fred Hutchinson, the Tigers compiled a 68–86 record and finished in fifth place in the American League. The team's statistical leaders included Harvey Kuenn with a .306 batting average, Ray Boone with 20 home runs and 85 RBIs, Steve Gromek with 18 wins, and Bob Miller with a 2.45 earned run average.
- 1954 Michigan Wolverines baseball team - Under head coach Ray Fisher, the Wolverines compiled a 22–9 record. Jack Corbett was the team captain.

=== American football ===
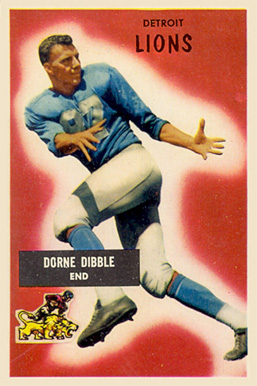
Dorne Dibble

- 1954 Detroit Lions season – Under head coach Buddy Parker, the Lions compiled a 9–2–1 record, finished in first place in the NFL Western Conference, and lost the 1954 NFL Championship Game to the Cleveland Browns. The team's statistical leaders included Bobby Layne with 1,818 passing yards, Lew Carpenter with 476 rushing yards, Dorne Dibble with 768 receiving yards, and Doak Walker with 106 points scored (five touchdowns, 43 extra points, and 11 field goals).
- 1954 Michigan Wolverines football team – Under head coach Bennie Oosterbaan, the Wolverines finished in a tie for second place in the Big Ten Conference with a record of 6–3 and were ranked No. 15 in the final AP and UPI Polls. Left tackle Art Walker was selected as a first-team All-American.
- 1954 Michigan State Spartans football team – Under head coach Duffy Daugherty, the Spartans compiled a 3–6 record.
- 1954 Central Michigan Chippewas football team – Under head coach Kenneth "Bill" Kelly, the Chippewas compiled an 8–2 record and tied for the Interstate Intercollegiate Athletic Conference (IIAC) championship.
- 1954 Detroit Titans football team – The Titans compiled a 2–7 record under head coach Wally Fromhart.
- 1954 Michigan State Normal Hurons football team – Under head coach Fred Trosko, the Hurons compiled a 7–2 record and tied with Central Michigan for the IIAC championship.
- 1954 Western Michigan Broncos football team – Under head coach Jack Petoskey, the Broncos compiled a 4–5 record.

=== Basketball ===
- 1953–54 Michigan Wolverines men's basketball team – Under head coach William Perigo, the Wolverines compiled a 9–13 record. Jim Barron was the team's leading scorer with 377 points in 22 games for an average of 17.1 points per game.
- 1953–54 Michigan State Spartans men's basketball team – Under head coach Pete Newell, the Spartans compiled a 9–13 record.
- 1953–54 Detroit Titans men's basketball team – The Titans compiled an 11–17 record under head coach Bob Calihan.
- 1953–54 Western Michigan Broncos men's basketball team – Under head coach Joseph Hoy, the Broncos compiled a 10–11 record.

=== Ice hockey ===
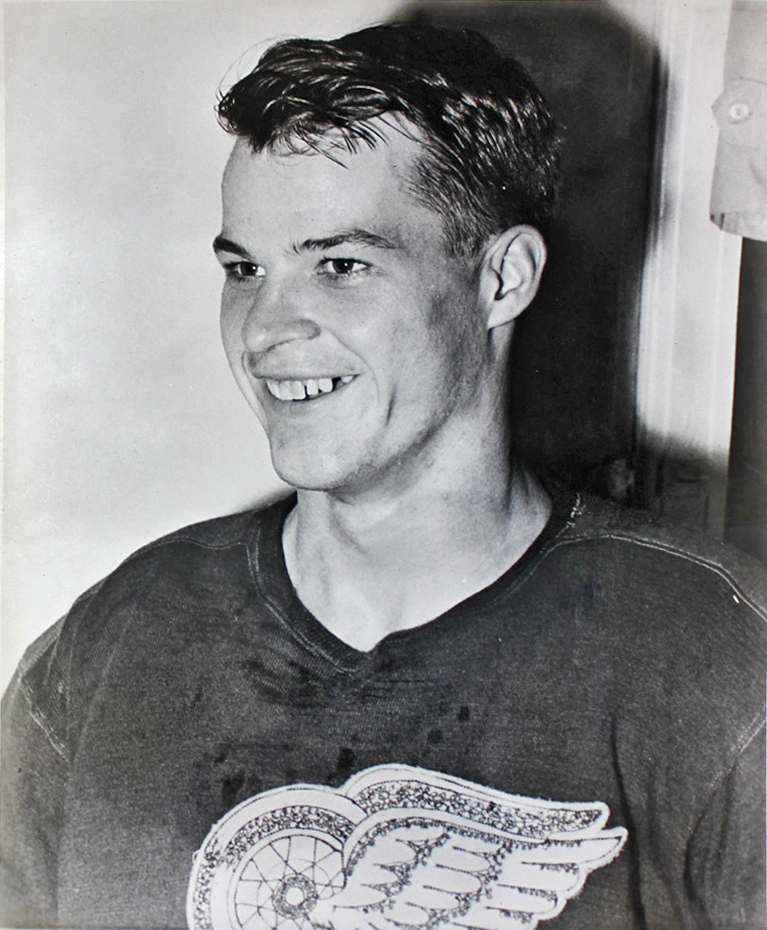
Gordie Howe

- 1953–54 Detroit Red Wings season – Under head coach Tommy Ivan, the Red Wings compiled a 37–19–14 record and defeated the Montreal Canadiens in seven games in the 1954 Stanley Cup Finals. Gordie Howe led the team with 33 goals, 48 assists, and 81 points. The team's goaltender was Terry Sawchuk.
- 1953–54 Michigan Wolverines men's ice hockey team – Under head coach Vic Heyliger, the team compiled a 15–6–2 record and finished third in the 1954 NCAA Division I Men's Ice Hockey Tournament.
- 1953–54 Michigan State Spartans men's ice hockey team – Under head coach Amo Bessone, the Spartans compiled an 8–14–1 record.
- 1953–54 Michigan Tech Huskies men's ice hockey team – Under head coach Al Renfrew, Michigan Tech compiled a 7–17–1 record.

=== Boat racing ===
- Port Huron to Mackinac Boat Race –
- APBA Gold Cup – Lou Fageol

=== Golfing ===
- Michigan Open – Horton Smith
- Motor City Open - Cary Middlecoff

== Chronology of events ==
=== November ===
- November 2 - A number of elections occurred, including:
  - Michigan House of Representatives - Robert Mahoney was elected to the Michigan House of Representatives seat representing the Wayne County 3rd district, becoming the first blind member of the Michigan Legislature.

== Births ==
- February 2 - Christie Brinkley, model and actress, in Monroe, Michigan
- March 20 - Steve McCatty, Major League Baseball pitcher (1977–1985), AL wins leader in 1981, in Detroit
- April 6 - Aaron Kyle, NFL cornerback (1976–1982), in Detroit
- April 23 - Michael Moore, documentary filmmaker (Roger & Me, Bowling for Columbine, Fahrenheit 9/11) and author, in Flint, Michigan
- May 31 - Paul Franklin, multi-instrumentalist, known mainly for his work as a steel guitarist, in Detroit
- October 8 - Tom Price, current Secretary of Health and Human Services, in Lansing, Michigan
- November 23 - Debbie Dingell, U.S. Representative from Michigan, wife of John Dingell who served for 60 years before her, in Detroit

=== Gallery of 1954 births ===
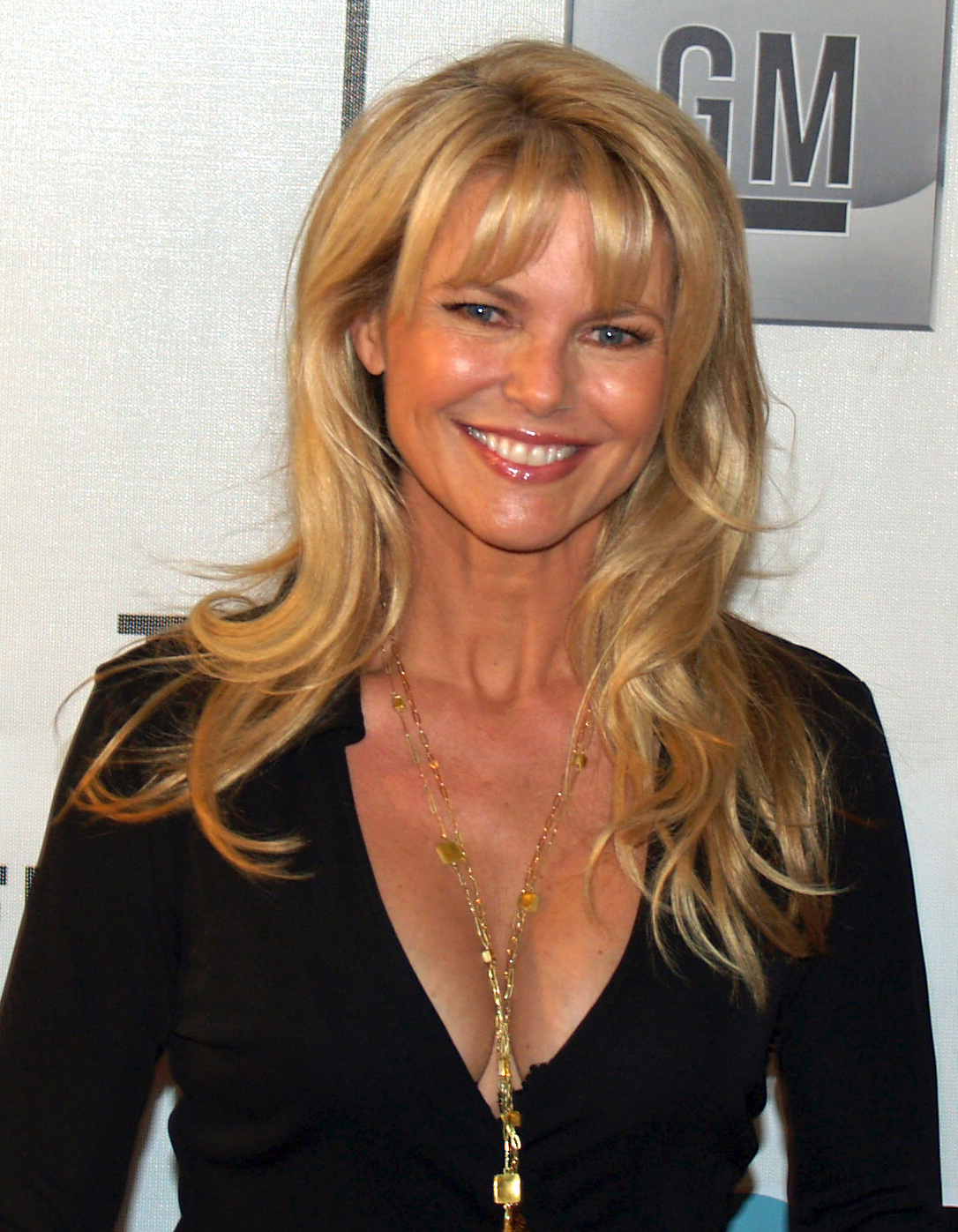
Christie Brinkley

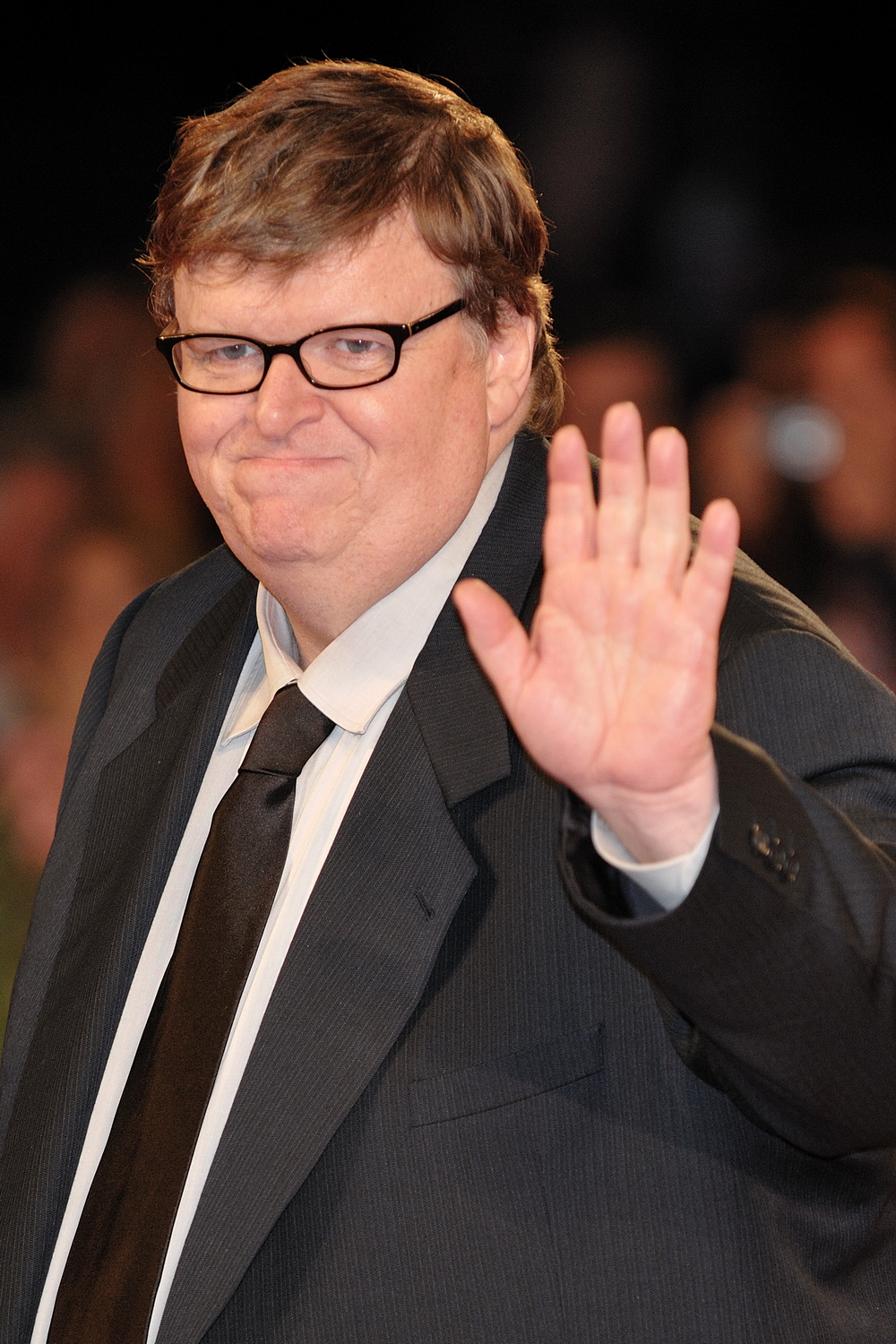
Michael Moore

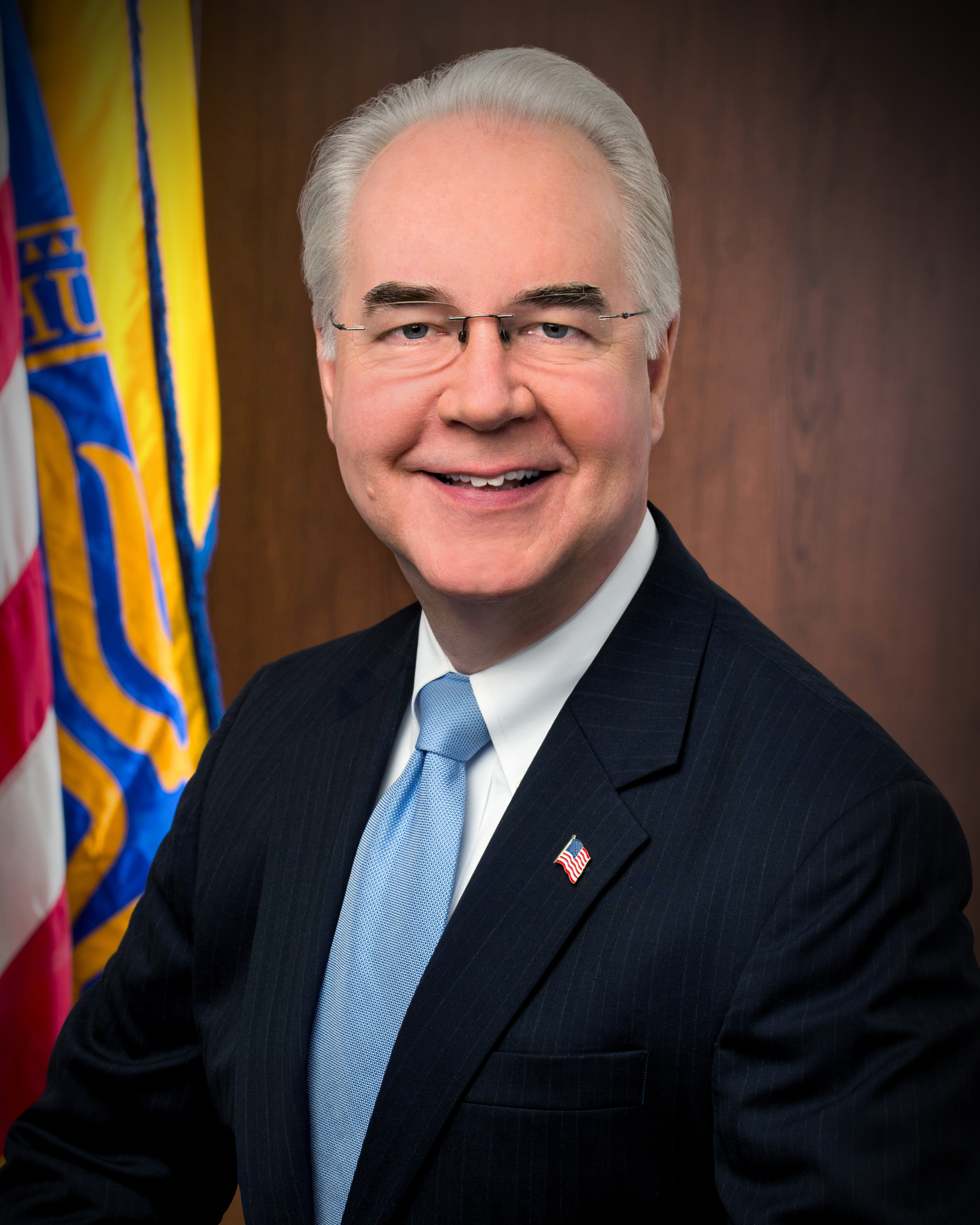
Tom Price

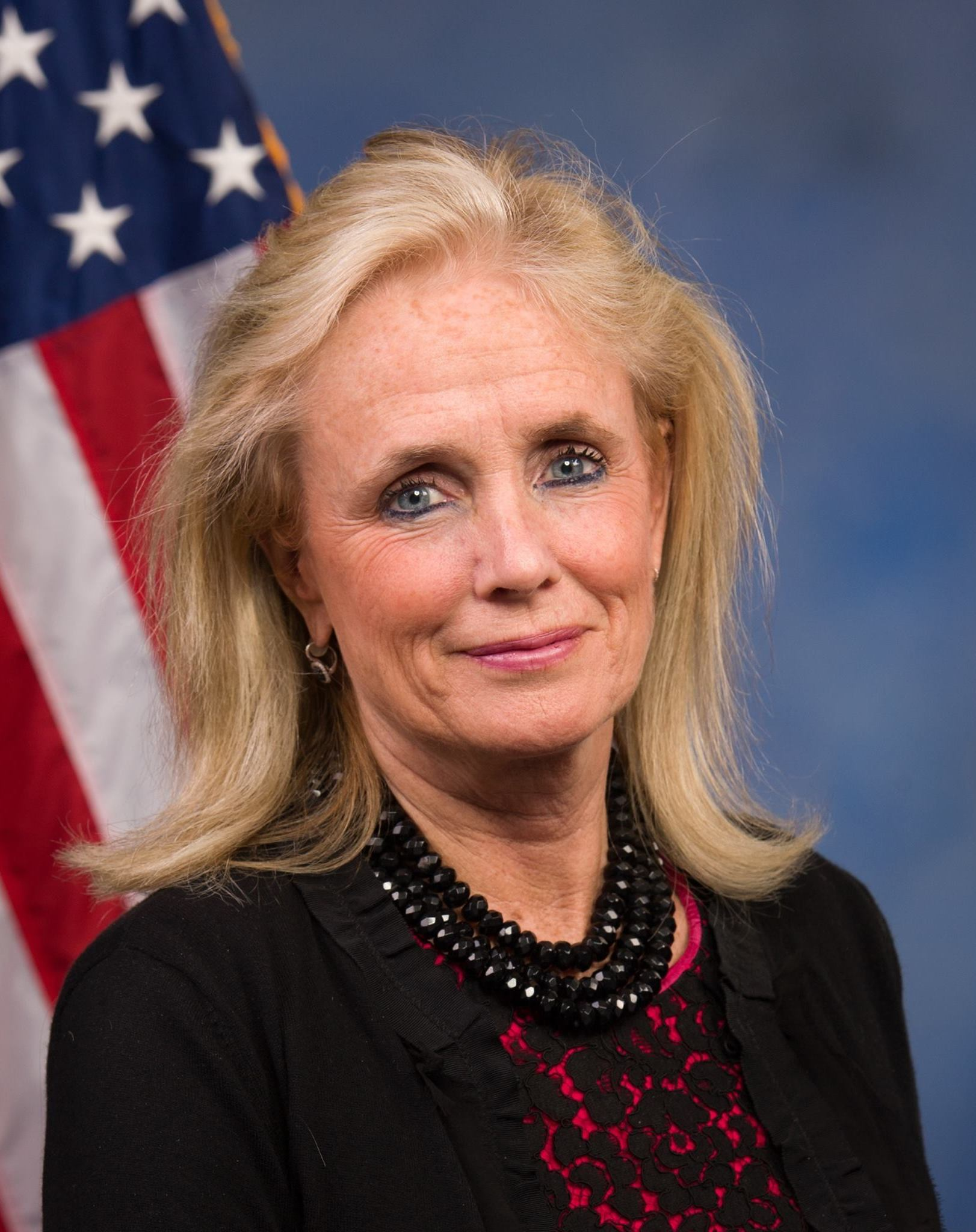
Debbie Dingell

== Deaths ==
- May 3 - Philip Bartelme, athletic director of the University of Michigan (1909–1921), credited with bringing basketball, hockey and swimming to varsity status, at age 77 in Carmel, California
- July 20 - Blair Moody, United States Senator from Michigan (1951–1952), at age 52 in Ann Arbor

=== Gallery of 1954 deaths ===
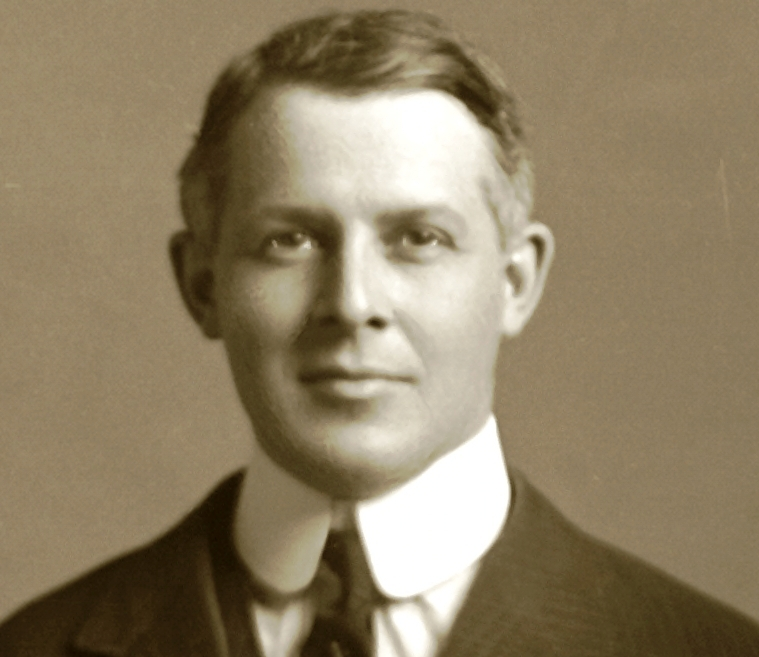
Philip Bartelme

== See also ==
- History of Michigan
- History of Detroit
