= 1957 in Michigan =

- Decades: 1930s; 1940s; 1950s; 1960s; 1970s
- See also: History of Michigan; Historical outline of Michigan; List of years in Michigan; 1957 in the United States

Events from the year 1957 in Michigan.

== Top stories ==
The Associated Press, United Press and Detroit Free Press each ranked the top Michigan news stories of 1957 as follows:

- The November 1 opening of the Mackinac Bridge between the state's Upper and Lower Peninsulas (AP-1, UP-1, DFP-5)
- The September 12 death of Detroit Mayor Albert Cobo and Louis Miriani taking over as the new mayor (AP-5, DFP-1)
- The sweep of statewide offices by Democratic Party candidates in April elections (AP-2, UP-6, DFP-2)
- The gun battle between two killers and police officers on the night of September 30 and early morning of October 1 that crossed from Indiana into Michigan and resulted in the death of a Michigan State Trooper and an Indiana State Trooper (UP-2)
- The debate over taxes and their impact on Michigan industry. The debate followed comments in April by General Motors President Harlow Curtice that high taxes were preventing the company from expanding its operations in Michigan. (AP-3, UP-3)
- The Detroit Lions won the NFL Western Division (and ultimately the NFL Championship Game) after George Wilson replaced Buddy Parker as the team's head coach (AP-8, DFP-4)
- The Asian flu outbreak that resulted in more than 40 deaths in Michigan in the fall (UP-4)
- Mackie's 10-year highway program (AP-4)
- The conviction by a jury in Muskegon of ex-convict Herman Barmore in the murder of a 12-year-old Boy Scout Peter Gorham. Gorham was shot in the wilderness as he returned from a hike in July 1955 to Camp Wabaningo, located 12 miles north of Muskegon. The trial was the longest in Muskegon County history. (UP-5)
- The state's campaign to cut highway deaths (AP-6)
- The death on October 30 of eight members of the Carrick family in a house fire in the Upper Peninsula community of Pickford, Michigan. (UP-7)
- Mackinac County Prosecutor James J. Brown rescue of his son's life by pushing a disabled raft in Lake Huron for four hours with his chin (AP-7)
- The October crash of a Navy space balloon near Hermansville, Michigan (UP-8)
- The rape and murder of Mary de Caussin, a six-year-old first-grader from Ecorse Township, Michigan, in mid-June 1957
- The arrest in Texas of Anna and Floyd Thorpe of St. Clair Shores on charges of embezzling state funds (AP-9 [tie])
- The plunge of Dick and Doris Robbins, a sister and brother from Detroit, over Tahquamenon Falls (AP-9 [tie])

== Office holders ==
=== State office holders ===
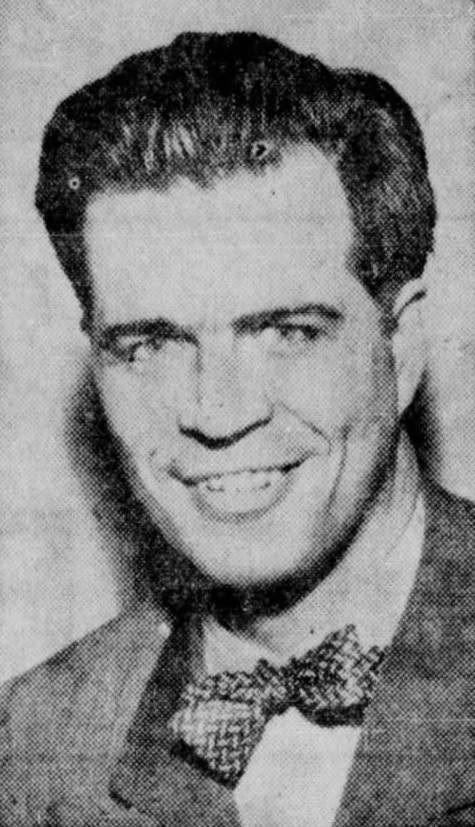
Gov. G. Mennen Williams

- Governor of Michigan: G. Mennen Williams (Democrat)
- Lieutenant Governor of Michigan: Philip Hart (Democrat)
- Michigan Attorney General: Thomas M. Kavanagh (Democrat)/Paul Adams
- Michigan Secretary of State: James M. Hare (Democrat)
- Speaker of the Michigan House of Representatives: George Van Peursem (Republican)
- Chief Justice, Michigan Supreme Court: John R. Dethmers

=== Mayors of major cities ===
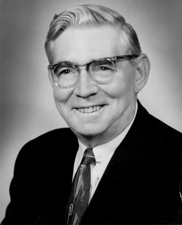
Patrick V. McNamara

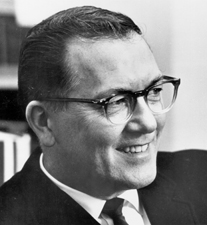
Robert P. Griffin

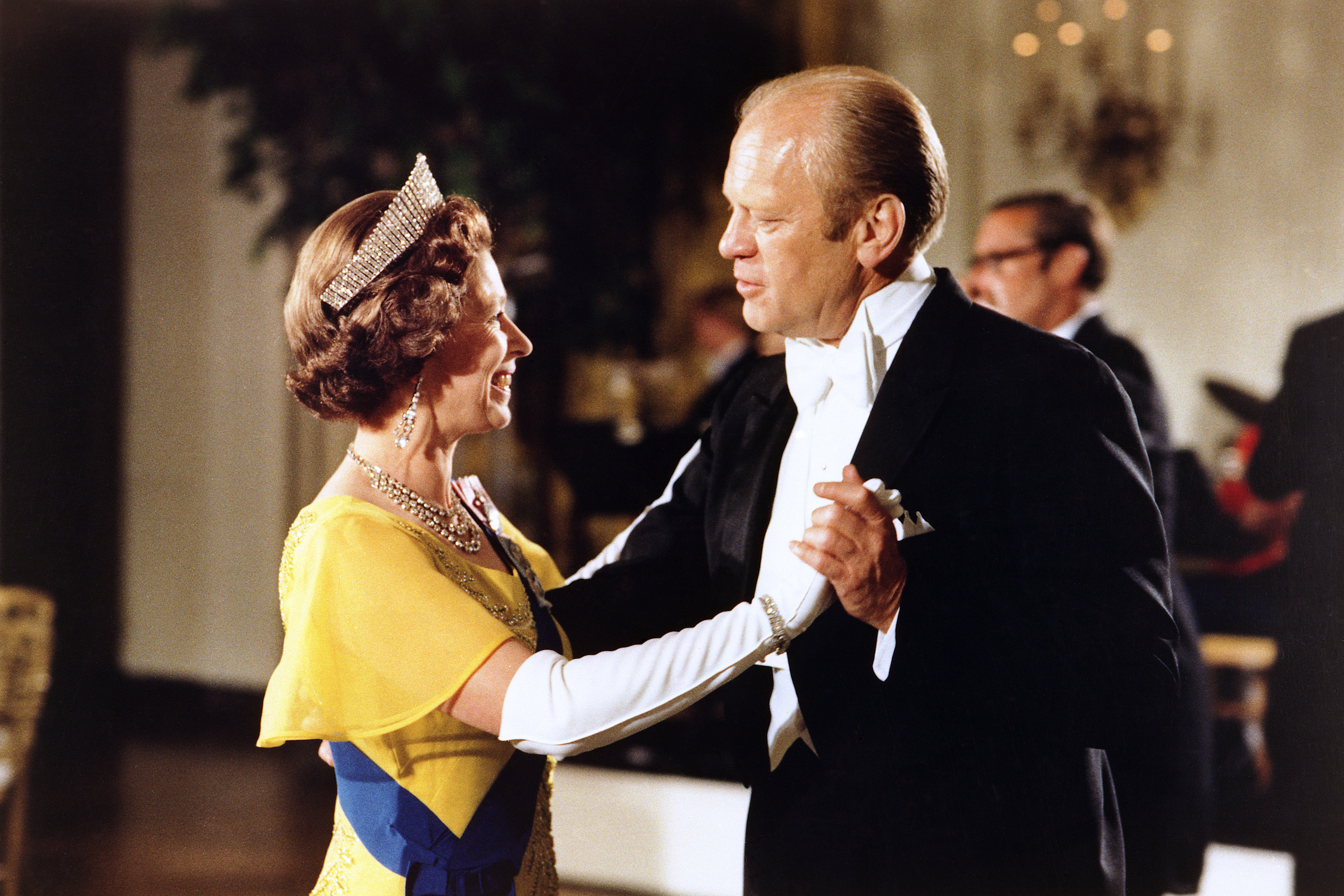
Gerald Ford and Elizabeth II

- Mayor of Detroit: Albert Cobo (Republican)/Louis Miriani
- Mayor of Grand Rapids: Paul G. Goebel
- Mayor of Warren, Michigan: Ted Bates
- Mayor of Flint: George M. Algoe
- Mayor of Saginaw: Maurice E. Brown/R. James Harvey
- Mayor of Dearborn: Orville L. Hubbard
- Mayor of Lansing: Ralph Crego
- Mayor of Ann Arbor: William E. Brown Jr./Samuel J. Eldersveld

=== Federal office holders ===
- U.S. Senator from Michigan: Patrick V. McNamara (Democrat)
- U.S. Senator from Michigan: Charles E. Potter (Republican)
- House District 1: Thaddeus M. Machrowicz (Democrat)
- House District 2: George Meader (Republican)
- House District 3: August E. Johansen (Republican)
- House District 4: Clare Hoffman (Republican)
- House District 5: Gerald Ford (Republican)
- House District 6: Charles E. Chamberlain (Republican)
- House District 7: Robert J. McIntosh (Republican)
- House District 8: Alvin Morell Bentley (Republican)
- House District 9: Robert P. Griffin (Republican)
- House District 10: Elford Albin Cederberg (Republican)
- House District 11: Victor A. Knox (Republican)
- House District 12: John B. Bennett (Republican)
- House District 13: Charles Diggs (Democrat)
- House District 14: Louis C. Rabaut (Democrat)
- House District 15: John Dingell Jr. (Democrat)
- House District 16: John Lesinski Jr. (Democrat)
- House District 17: Martha Griffiths (Democrat)
- House District 18: William Broomfield (Republican)

== Population ==
In the 1950 United States census, Michigan was recorded as having a population of 6,421,000 persons, ranking as the seventh most populous state in the country. By 1960, the state's population had grown 22.8% to 7,823,194 persons.

=== Cities ===
The following is a list of cities in Michigan with a population of at least 40,000 based on 1950 U.S. Census data. Historic census data from 1940 and 1960 is included to reflect trends in population increases or decreases. Cities that are part of the Detroit metropolitan area are shaded in tan.

1950 Rank	City	County	1940 Pop.	1950 Pop.	1960 Pop.	Change 1950-60
1	Detroit	Wayne	1,623,452	1,849,568	1,670,144	−9.7%
2	Grand Rapids	Kent	164,292	176,515	177,313	0.5%
3	Flint	Genesee	151,543	163,143	196,940	20.7%
4	Dearborn	Wayne	63,589	94,994	112,007	17.9%
5	Saginaw	Saginaw	82,794	92,918	98,265	5.8%
6	Lansing	Ingham	78,753	92,129	107,807	17.0%
7	Pontiac	Oakland	66,626	73,681	82,233	11.6%
8	Kalamazoo	Kalamazoo	54,097	57,704	82,089	42.4%
9	Bay City	Bay	47,956	52,523	53,604	2.1%
10	Jackson	Jackson	49,656	51,088	50,720	−0.7%
11	Battle Creek	Calhoun	43,453	48,666	44,169	−9.2%
12	Muskegon	Muskegon	47,697	48,429	46,485	−4.0%
13	Ann Arbor	Washtenaw	29,815	48,251	67,340	39.6%
14	Royal Oak	Oakland	25,087	46,898	80,612	71.9%
15	Warren	Macomb	23,658	42,653	89,246	109.2%

=== Counties ===
The following is a list of counties in Michigan with populations of at least 100,000 based on 1950 U.S. Census data. Historic census data from 1940 and 1960 are included to reflect trends in population increases or decreases. Counties that are part of the Detroit metropolitan area are shaded in tan.

1980 Rank	County	Largest city	1940 Pop.	1950 Pop.	1960 Pop.	Change 1950-60
1	Wayne	Detroit	2,015,623	2,435,235	2,666,297	9.5%
2	Oakland	Pontiac	254,068	396,001	690,259	74.3%
3	Kent	Grand Rapids	246,338	288,292	363,187	26.0%
4	Genesee	Flint	227,944	270,963	374,313	38.1%
5	Macomb	Warren	107,638	184,961	405,804	119.4%
6	Ingham	Lansing	130,616	172,941	211,296	22.2%
7	Saginaw	Saginaw	130,468	153,515	190,752	24.3%
8	Washtenaw	Ann Arbor	80,810	134,606	172,440	28.1%
9	Kalamazoo	Kalamazoo	100,085	126,707	169,712	33.9%
10	Muskegon	Muskegon	94,501	121,545	129,943	6.9%
11	Calhoun	Battle Creek	94,206	120,813	138,858	14.9%
12	Berrien	Benton Harbor	89,117	115,702	149,865	29.5%
13	Jackson	Jackson	93,108	108,168	131,994	22.0%

== Sports ==
=== Baseball ===
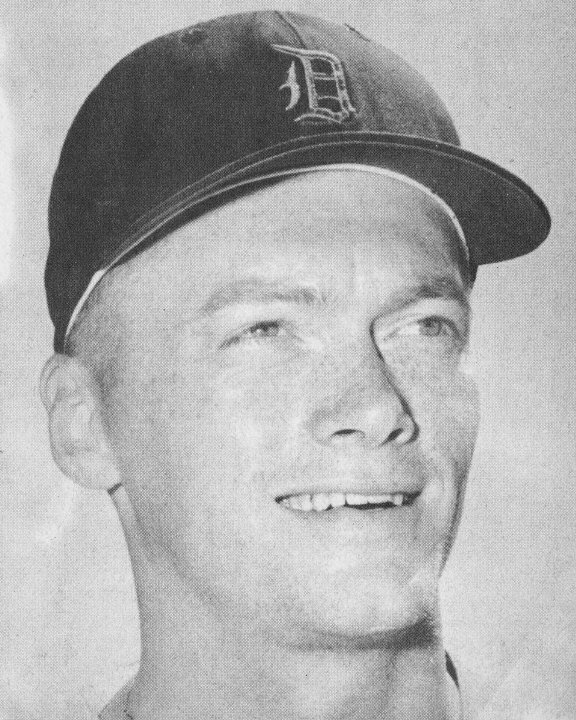
Jim Bunning

- 1957 Detroit Tigers season – Under manager Jack Tighe, the Tigers compiled a 78–76 record and finished in fourth place in the American League. The team's statistical leaders included Al Kaline with a .295 batting average and 90 RBIs, Charlie Maxwell with 24 home runs, and Jim Bunning with 20 wins and a 2.69 earned run average.
- 1957 Michigan Wolverines baseball team - Under head coach Ray Fisher, the Wolverines compiled a 17–7 record. Ken Tippery was the team captain.

=== American football ===
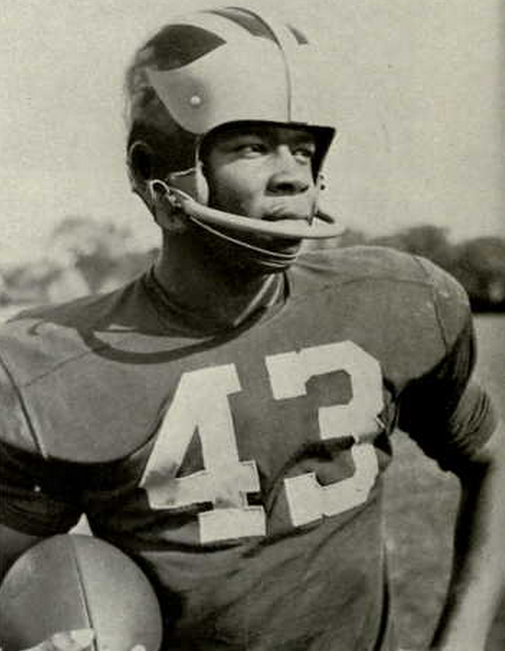
Jim Pace

- 1957 Detroit Lions season – The Lions, under head coach George Wilson, compiled an 8–4 record, finished in first place in the NFL Western Conference, and defeated the Cleveland Browns in the 1957 NFL Championship Game. The team's statistical leaders included Bobby Layne with 1,169 passing yards and 43 points scored (25 extra points, and 6 field goals), John Henry Johnson with 621 rushing yards, and Jim Doran with 624 receiving yards.
- 1957 Michigan State Spartans football team – Under head coach Duffy Daugherty, the Spartans compiled an 8–1 record and were ranked No. 3 in the final AP Poll. The team's statistical leaders included quarterback Jim Ninowski with 718 passing yards, Walt Kowalczyk with 545 rushing yards, and Dave Kaiser with 267 receiving yards.
- 1957 Michigan Wolverines football team – Under head coach Bennie Oosterbaan, the Wolverines compiled a 5-3-1 record. Jim Pace won the Chicago Tribune Silver Football trophy as the most valuable player in the Big Ten Conference. The team's statistical leaders included Jim Van Pelt with 629 passing yards, Jim Pace with 664 rushing yards and 54 points scored, and Gary Prahst with 233 receiving yards.
- 1957 Eastern Michigan Hurons football team – Under head coach Fred Trosko, the Hurons compiled a 6–3 record and won the Interstate Intercollegiate Athletic Conference championship.
- 1957 Central Michigan Chippewas football team – Under head coach Kenneth "Bill" Kelly, the Chippewas compiled a 4–6 record.
- 1957 Western Michigan Broncos football team – Under head coach Merle Schlosser, the Broncos compiled a 4–4–1 record.
- 1957 Detroit Titans football team – The Titans compiled a 6–3 record under head coach Wally Fromhart.

=== Basketball ===
- Detroit Pistons - On February 14, 1957, Fort Wayne Pistons owner Fred Zollner announced that he had signed a six-year deal with the Detroit Olympia to move the Pistons to Detroit for six years starting in the fall of 1957. In their first home game in Detroit, the Pistons lost to the NBA champion Boston Celtics on October 23 by a 105-94 score. The game was played at the Olympia before a crowd of 10,965.
- 1956–57 Michigan State Spartans men's basketball team – Under head coach Forddy Anderson, the Spartans compiled a 16–10 record. Jack Quiggle led the team with an average of 15.4 points per game.
- 1956–57 Michigan Wolverines men's basketball team – Under head coach William Perigo, the Wolverines compiled a 13–9 record. Ron Kramer established the school career scoring record with 1,119 points. Kramer earned team MVP for the third year in a row.
- 1956–57 Western Michigan Broncos men's basketball team – Under head coach Joseph Hoy, the Broncos compiled an 8–13 record.
- 1956–57 Detroit Titans men's basketball team – The Titans compiled an 11–15 record under head coach Bob Calihan.

=== Ice hockey ===
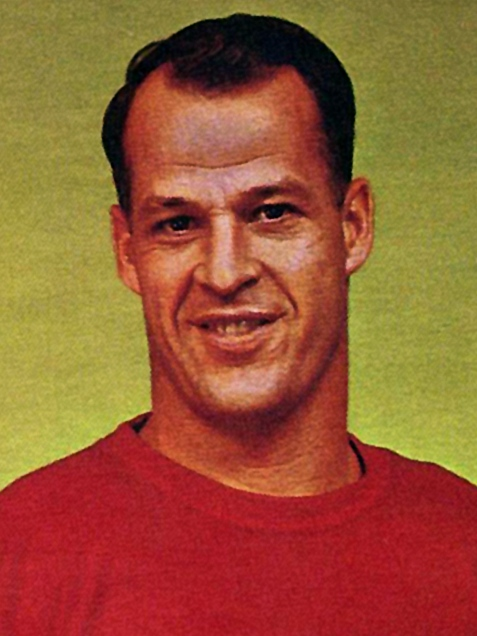
Gordie Howe

- 1956–57 Detroit Red Wings season – Under head coach Jimmy Skinner, the Red Wings compiled a 38–20–12 record and finished in first place in the National Hockey League, but lost to the Boston Bruins in the first round of the playoffs. Gordie Howe led the team with 44 goals and 89 points and Ted Lindsay led the team with 55 assists. The team's goaltender was Glenn Hall.
- 1956–57 Michigan Wolverines men's ice hockey season – Under head coach Vic Heyliger, the Wolverines compiled an 18–5–2 record and finished second in the 1957 NCAA Division I Men's Ice Hockey Tournament.
- 1956–57 Michigan Tech Huskies men's ice hockey team – Under head coach John MacInnes, Michigan Tech compiled a 14–9–5 record.
- 1956–57 Michigan State Spartans men's ice hockey team – Under head coach Amo Bessone, the Spartans compiled a 7–15 record.

=== Boat racing ===
- Port Huron to Mackinac Boat Race –

=== Golf ===
- Michigan Open – Walter Burkemo
- Motor City Open -

== Chronology of events ==
=== January ===
- January 1 - G. Mennen Williams was sworn in for his record fifth term as Governor of Michigan.

== Births ==
- May 3 - William Clay Ford Jr., former president, CEO, and COO of Ford Motor Co., in Detroit
- May 4 - Rick Leach, U-M quarterback (1975–1978), Major League Baseball player (1981–1990), in Ann Arbor, Michigan
- May 28 - Kirk Gibson, Major League Baseball player (1979–1995) and manager (2010–2014), 2x World Series champion, 1988 National League MVP, in Pontiac, Michigan
- June 12 - Timothy Busfield, Emmy-winning actor (The West Wing, Thirtysomething), in Lansing, Michigan
- July 6 - Susan Ford, daughter of Gerald Ford, author, photojournalist, and former chair of the board of the Betty Ford Center, in Washington, D.C.
- July 30 - Clint Hurdle, Major League Baseball player (1977–1987) and manager (2002–present), National League Manager of the Year in 2013, in Big Rapids, Michigan

=== Gallery of 1957 births ===
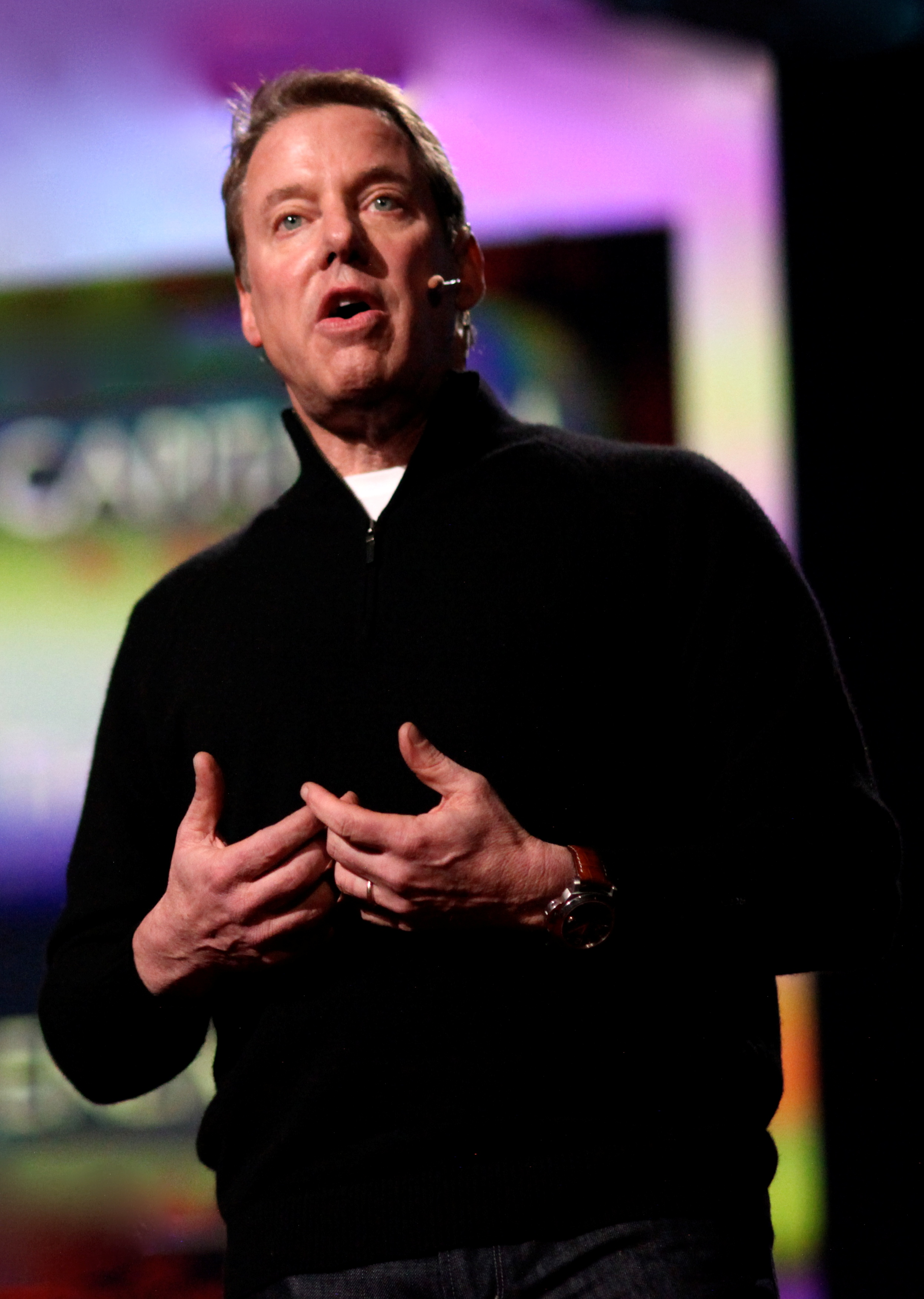
William Clay Ford Jr.

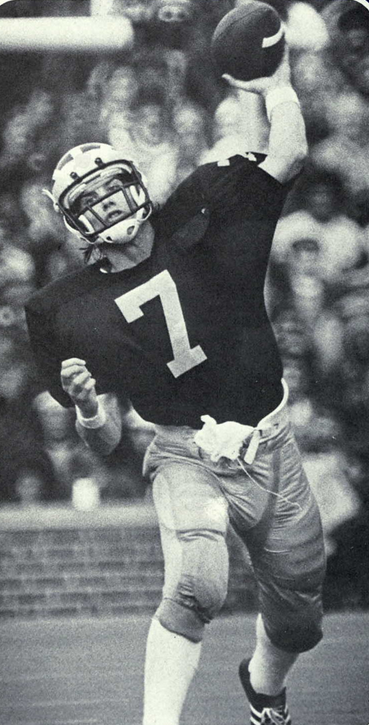
Rick Leach

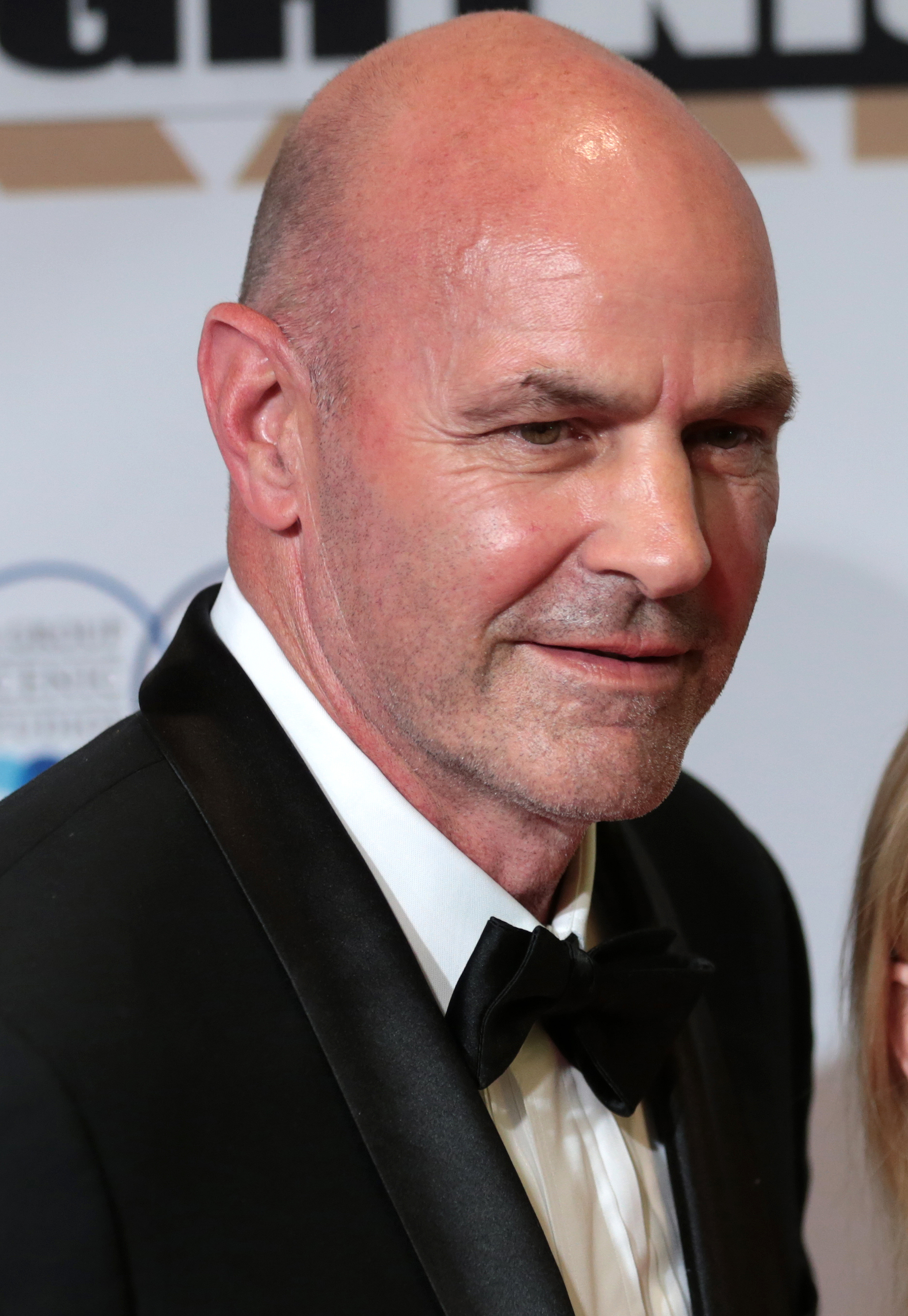
Kirk Gibson

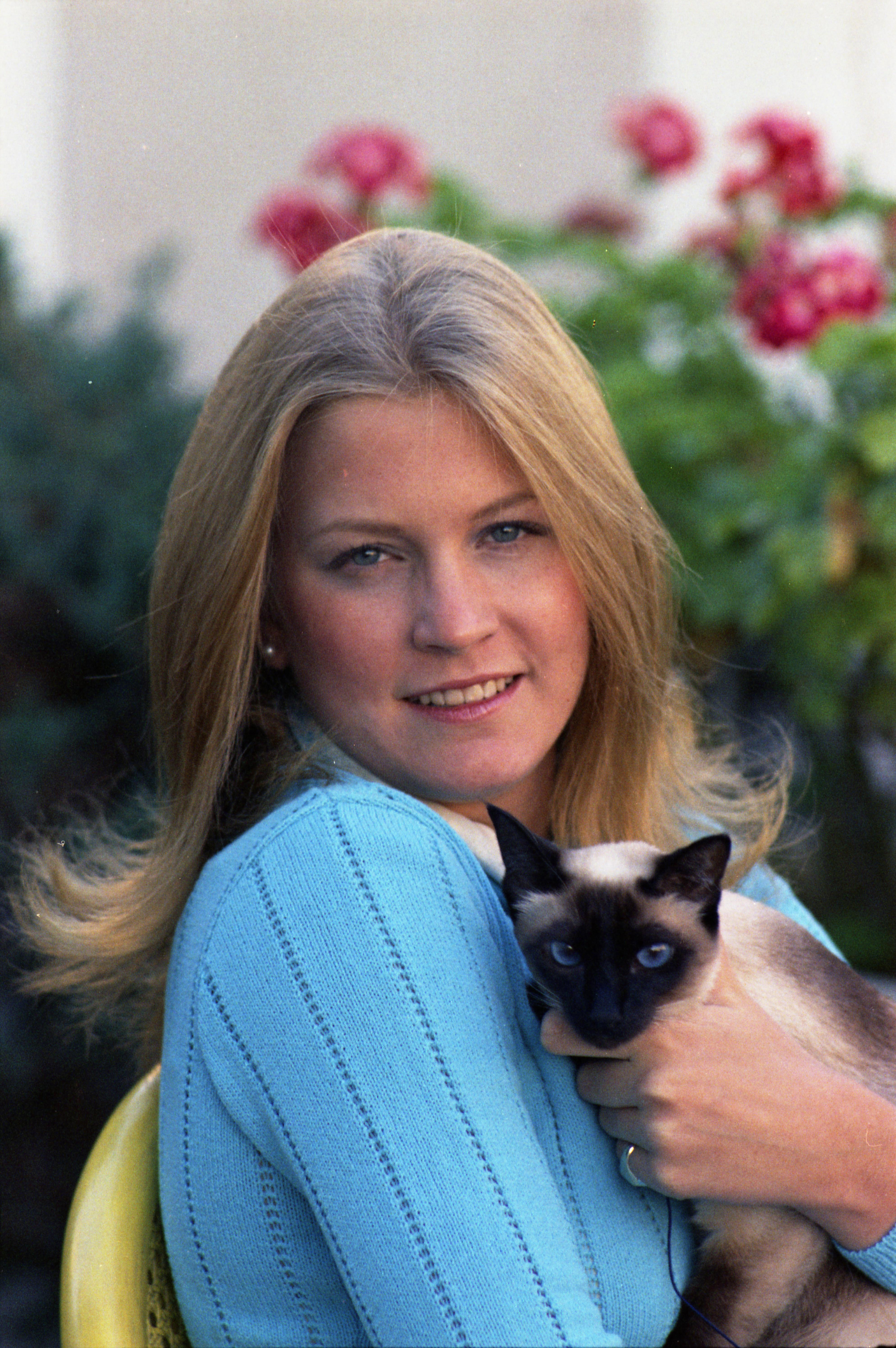
Susan Ford

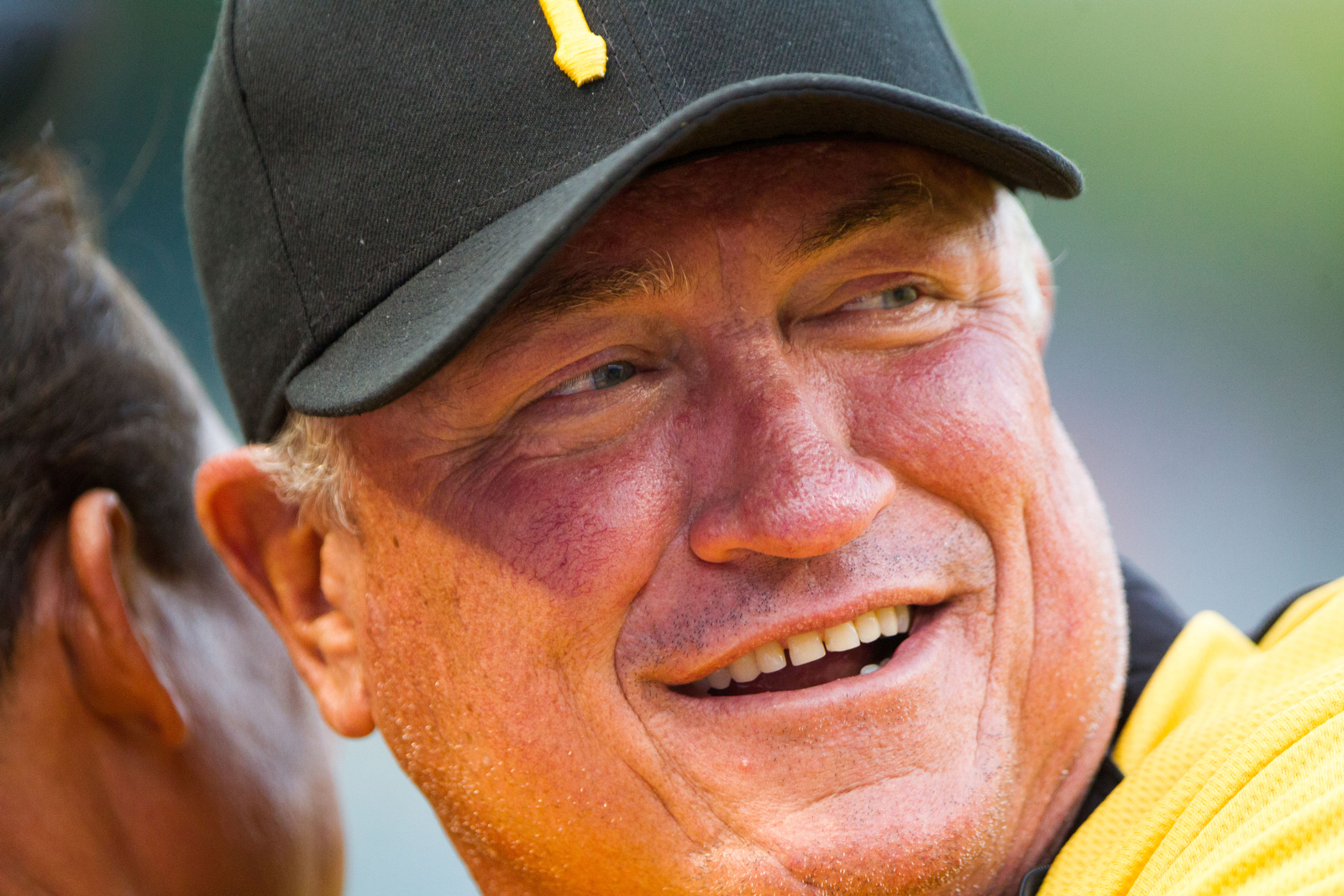
Clint Hurdle

== Deaths ==
- April 13 - Fred L. Crawford, Congressman from Michigan's 8th District (1935-1953), at age 69 in Washington, D.C.
- July 4 - Earl C. Michener, Congressman from Michigan (1919-1933, 1935-1951), at age 80 in Adrian, Michigan
- July 30 - Charles Bowles, Mayor of Detroit for six months in 1930, at age 73 in Detroit
- July 31 - Solanus Casey, Roman Catholic Capuchin priest and wonderworker, beatified by Pope Francis in 2017, at age 86 in Detroit
- September 12 - Albert Cobo, Mayor of Detroit (1950-1957), at 63 in Detroit
- September - William Cunningham, first Michigan football player to be recognized as first-team All-American, at age 84 in Grove City, Pennsylvania
- October 20 - Jason E. Hammond, Michigan Superintendent of Public Instruction (1897-1900), at age 95 in New York City
- October 25 - George D. O'Brien, U.S. Congressman (1937-1939, 1941-1947, 1949-1955), at age 57

=== Gallery of 1957 deaths ===
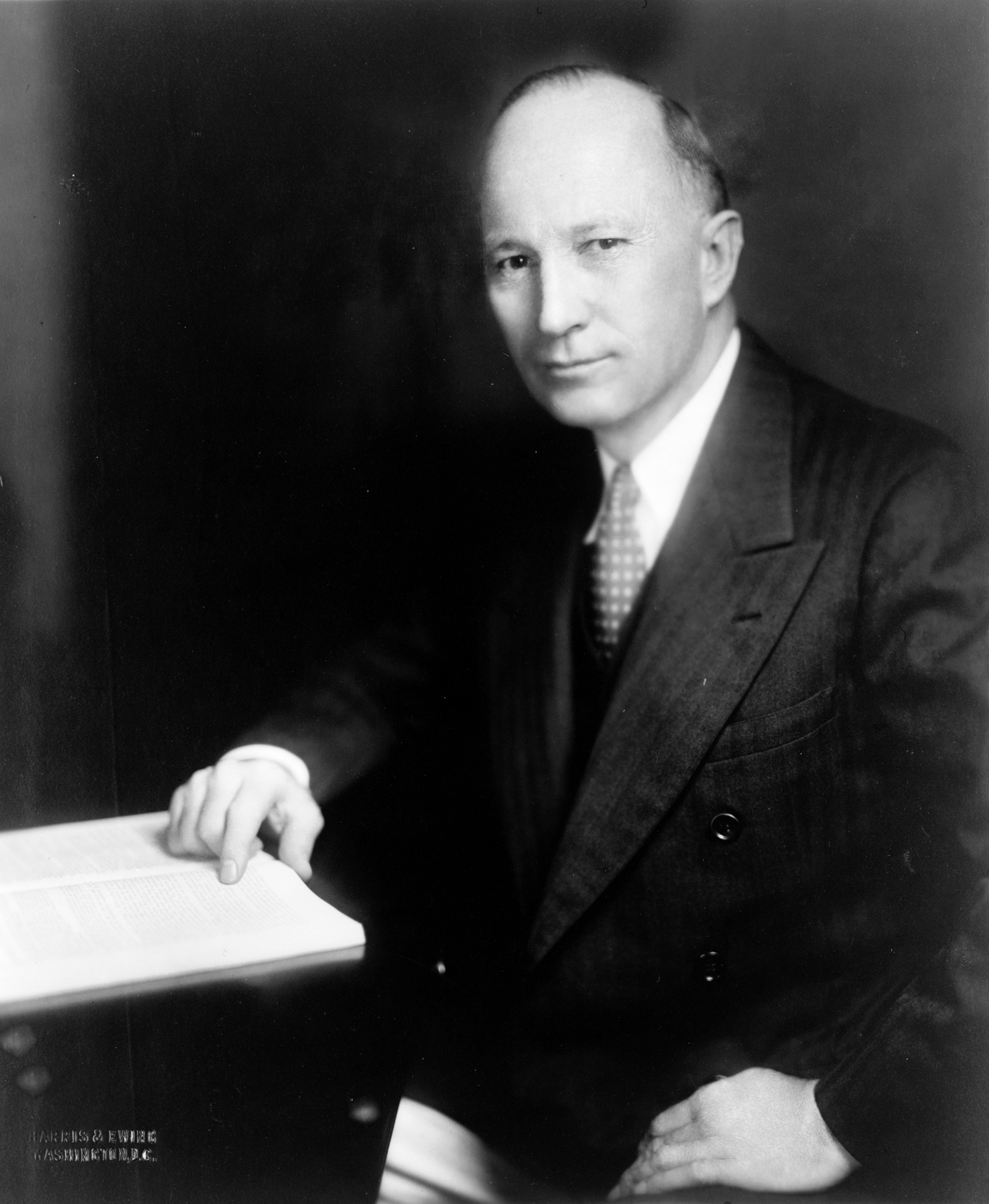
Fred L. Crawford

== See also ==
- History of Michigan
- History of Detroit
