= 1951 in Michigan =

- Decades: 1930s; 1940s; 1950s; 1960s; 1970s
- See also: History of Michigan; Historical outline of Michigan; List of years in Michigan; 1951 in the United States

Events from the year 1951 in Michigan.

== Top stories ==
The Associated Press polled more than 50 editors of its member newspapers in Michigan and ranked the state's top news stories of 1953 as follows:

1. The April 18 death of U.S. Senator Arthur Vandenberg (369 points)
2. The February 8 state office building fire in Lansing set by arsonist Richard Shay (304 points)
3. The Ann Arbor murder of nurse Pauline Campbell by three teenagers seeking beer money (198 points)
4. The February 8 hearing of the Kefauver Committee examining Detroit's underworld (154 points)
5. The arrest, trial and conviction of farm youths Valorus Mattheis and Raymond Lee Olson for the 1950 murder of college student Caroline Drown near Kalamazoo (152 points)
6. The 1951 Michigan State Spartans football team (126 points)
7. An automobile crash near Pontiac killed Mr. and Mrs. Murray Moore, parents of 11 children (113 points)
8. Crime rampage of by Warren Lee Irwin following a murder near Oxford, Michigan (108 points)
9. Tie for ninth place (each story receiving 91 points) between:

* July 9 death of Detroit Tigers' great Harry Heilmann
* Michigan Legislature's increase in the gasoline tax

== Office holders ==
=== State office holders ===
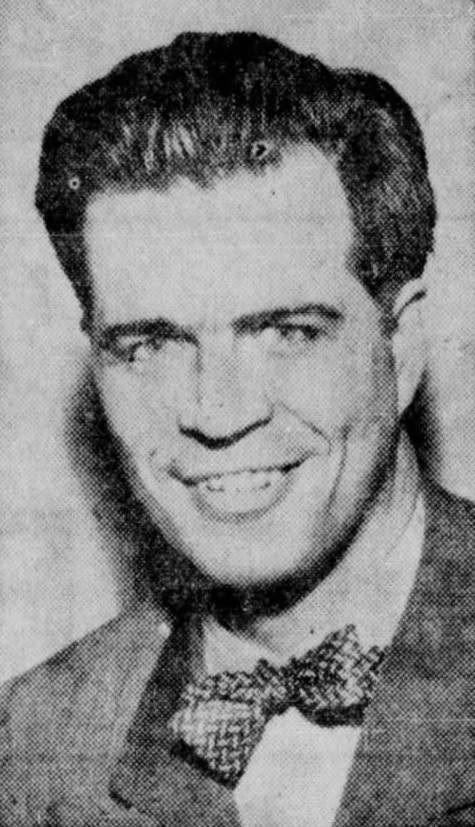
Gov. G. Mennen Williams

- Governor of Michigan: G. Mennen Williams (Democrat)
- Lieutenant Governor of Michigan: John W. Connolly (Democrat)/William C. Vandenberg (Republican)
- Michigan Attorney General: Stephen John Roth/Frank Millard (Republican)
- Michigan Secretary of State: Frederick M. Alger Jr. (Republican)
- Speaker of the Michigan House of Representatives: Victor A. Knox (Republican)
- Chief Justice, Michigan Supreme Court: Neil E. Reid

=== Mayors of major cities ===
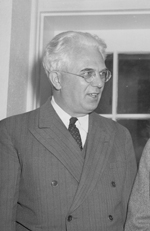
Sen. Homer Ferguson

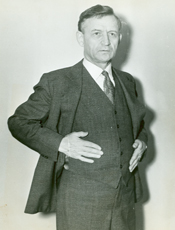
Rep. Clare Hoffman

- Mayor of Detroit: Albert Cobo (Republican)
- Mayor of Grand Rapids: Paul G. Goebel
- Mayor of Flint: Paul Lovegrove
- Mayor of Saginaw: Edwin W. Koepke/William R. Hart
- Mayor of Dearborn: Orville L. Hubbard
- Mayor of Lansing: Ralph Crego
- Mayor of Ann Arbor: William E. Brown Jr.

=== Federal office holders ===
- U.S. Senator from Michigan: Homer S. Ferguson (Republican)
- U.S. Senator from Michigan: Arthur Vandenberg (Republican)/Blair Moody (Democrat)
- House District 1: Thaddeus M. Machrowicz (Democrat)
- House District 2: George Meader (Republican)
- House District 3: Paul W. Shafer (Republican)
- House District 4: Clare Hoffman (Republican)
- House District 5: Gerald Ford (Republican)
- House District 6: William W. Blackney (Republican)
- House District 7: Jesse P. Wolcott (Republican)
- House District 8: Fred L. Crawford (Republican)
- House District 9: Ruth Thompson (Republican)
- House District 10: Roy O. Woodruff (Republican)
- House District 11: Charles E. Potter (Republican)
- House District 12: John B. Bennett (Republican)
- House District 13: George D. O'Brien (Democrat)
- House District 14: Louis C. Rabaut (Democrat)
- House District 15: John Dingell Sr. (Democrat)
- House District 16: John Lesinski Jr. (Democrat)
- House District 17: George Anthony Dondero (Republican)

== Population ==
In the 1950 United States census, Michigan was recorded as having a population of 6,421,000 persons, ranking as the seventh most populous state in the country. By 1960, the state's population had grown 22.8% to 7,823,194 persons.

=== Cities ===
The following is a list of cities in Michigan with a population of at least 40,000 based on 1950 U.S. Census data. Historic census data from 1940 and 1960 is included to reflect trends in population increases or decreases. Cities that are part of the Detroit metropolitan area are shaded in tan.

1950 Rank	City	County	1940 Pop.	1950 Pop.	1960 Pop.	Change 1950-60
1	Detroit	Wayne	1,623,452	1,849,568	1,670,144	−9.7%
2	Grand Rapids	Kent	164,292	176,515	177,313	0.5%
3	Flint	Genesee	151,543	163,143	196,940	20.7%
4	Dearborn	Wayne	63,589	94,994	112,007	17.9%
5	Saginaw	Saginaw	82,794	92,918	98,265	5.8%
6	Lansing	Ingham	78,753	92,129	107,807	17.0%
7	Pontiac	Oakland	66,626	73,681	82,233	11.6%
8	Kalamazoo	Kalamazoo	54,097	57,704	82,089	42.4%
9	Bay City	Bay	47,956	52,523	53,604	2.1%
10	Jackson	Jackson	49,656	51,088	50,720	−0.7%
11	Battle Creek	Calhoun	43,453	48,666	44,169	−9.2%
12	Muskegon	Muskegon	47,697	48,429	46,485	−4.0%
13	Ann Arbor	Washtenaw	29,815	48,251	67,340	39.6%
14	Royal Oak	Oakland	25,087	46,898	80,612	71.9%
15	Warren	Macomb	23,658	42,653	89,246	109.2%

=== Counties ===
The following is a list of counties in Michigan with populations of at least 100,000 based on 1950 U.S. Census data. Historic census data from 1940 and 1960 are included to reflect trends in population increases or decreases. Counties that are part of the Detroit metropolitan area are shaded in tan.

1980 Rank	County	Largest city	1940 Pop.	1950 Pop.	1960 Pop.	Change 1950-60
1	Wayne	Detroit	2,015,623	2,435,235	2,666,297	9.5%
2	Oakland	Pontiac	254,068	396,001	690,259	74.3%
3	Kent	Grand Rapids	246,338	288,292	363,187	26.0%
4	Genesee	Flint	227,944	270,963	374,313	38.1%
5	Macomb	Warren	107,638	184,961	405,804	119.4%
6	Ingham	Lansing	130,616	172,941	211,296	22.2%
7	Saginaw	Saginaw	130,468	153,515	190,752	24.3%
8	Washtenaw	Ann Arbor	80,810	134,606	172,440	28.1%
9	Kalamazoo	Kalamazoo	100,085	126,707	169,712	33.9%
10	Muskegon	Muskegon	94,501	121,545	129,943	6.9%
11	Calhoun	Battle Creek	94,206	120,813	138,858	14.9%
12	Berrien	Benton Harbor	89,117	115,702	149,865	29.5%
13	Jackson	Jackson	93,108	108,168	131,994	22.0%

== Sports ==
=== Baseball ===
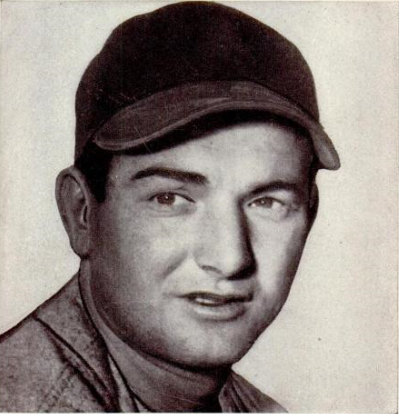
George Kell

- 1951 Detroit Tigers season – Under managers Red Rolfe, the Tigers compiled a 73–81 record and finished in fifth place in the American League. The team's statistical leaders included George Kell with a .319 batting average, Vic Wertz with 27 home runs and 94 RBIs, Virgil Trucks with 13 wins, and Fred Hutchinson with a 3.68 earned run average.
- 1951 Michigan Wolverines baseball season - Under head coach Ray Fisher, the Wolverines compiled a 13–10 record. Leo Koceski was the team captain.

=== American football ===
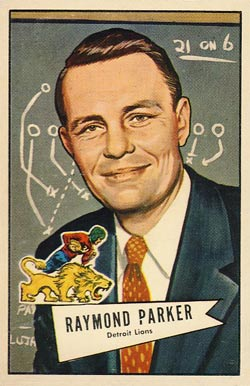
Buddy Parker

- 1951 Detroit Lions season – Under head coach Buddy Parker, the Lions compiled a 7–4–1 record and finished in second place in the NFL National Division. The team's statistical leaders included Bobby Layne with 2,403 passing yards, Robert Hoernschemeyer with 678 rushing yards, Dorne Dibble with 613 receiving yards, and Doak Walker with 97 points scored (6 touchdowns, 43 extra points, 6 field goals).
- 1951 Michigan State Spartans football team – Under head coach Biggie Munn, the Spartans compiled a 9–0 record and were ranked No. 2 in the final AP Poll.
- 1951 Michigan Wolverines football team – Under head coach Bennie Oosterbaan, the Wolverines finished in fourth place in the Big Ten Conference with a record of 4–5.
- 1951 Central Michigan Chippewas football team – Under head coach Kenneth "Bill" Kelly, the Chippewas compiled a 5–3 record.
- 1951 Detroit Titans football team – The Titans compiled a 4–7 record under head coach Dutch Clark.
- 1951 Michigan State Normal Hurons football team – Under head coach Harry Ockerman, the Hurons compiled a 4–5 record.
- 1951 Western Michigan Broncos football team – Under head coach John Gill, the Broncos compiled a 4–4 record.

=== Basketball ===
- 1950–51 Michigan Wolverines men's basketball team – Under head coach Ernie McCoy, the Wolverines compiled a 7–15 record. Leo VanderKuy was the team's leading scorer with 329 points in 22 games for an average of 15.0 points per game.
- 1950–51 Michigan State Spartans men's basketball team – Under head coach Pete Newell, the Spartans compiled a 10–11 record.
- 1950–51 Detroit Titans men's basketball team – The Titans compiled a 17–14 record under head coach Bob Calihan.
- 1950–51 Western Michigan Broncos men's basketball team – Under head coach William Perigo, the Broncos compiled a 13–9 record.

=== Ice hockey ===
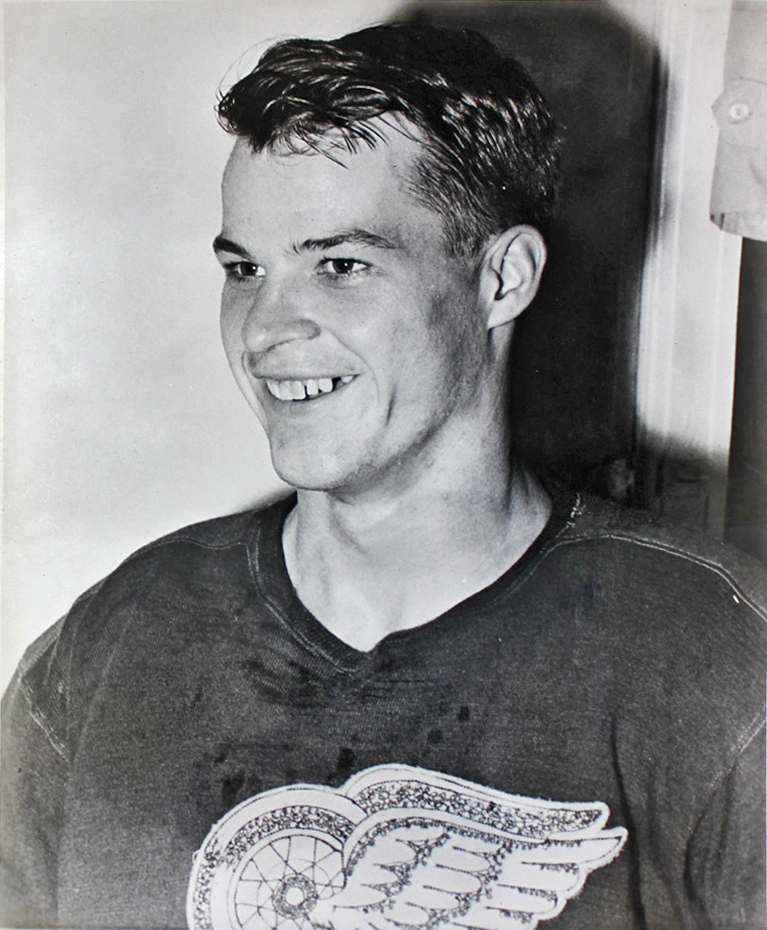
Gordie Howe

- 1950–51 Detroit Red Wings season – Under head coach Tommy Ivan, the Red Wings compiled a 44–13–13 record, finished in first place in the National Hockey League, and lost to the Montreal Canadiens in the semi-finals of the playoffs. Gordie Howe led the team with 43 goals, 43 assists, and 86 points. The team's goaltender was Terry Sawchuk.
- 1950–51 Michigan Wolverines men's ice hockey season – Under head coach Vic Heyliger, the team compiled a 22–4–1 record and won the 1951 NCAA Division I Men's Ice Hockey Tournament, the Wolverines' first of three consecutive NCAA hockey championships.
- 1950–51 Michigan State Spartans men's ice hockey team – Under head coach Harold Paulsen, the Spartans compiled a 6–11 record.
- 1950–51 Michigan Tech Huskies men's ice hockey team – Under head coach Al Renfrew, Michigan Tech compiled a 5–14–2 record.

=== Boat racing ===
- Port Huron to Mackinac Boat Race –
- APBA Gold Cup – Lou Fageol

=== Golfing ===
- Michigan Open – Walter Burkemo
- Motor City Open -

== Chronology of events ==
=== January ===
- January 3 - The first African-American woman to be elected to the Michigan Legislature, Charline White, was sworn into the office.

== Births ==
- January 22 - Leon Roberts, Major League Baseball outfielder (1974–1984), in Vicksburg, Michigan
- January 28 - Bob Sutton, head football coach at Army (1991-1999), in Ypsilanti, Michigan
- March 16 - Joe DeLamielleure, NFL offensive lineman (1973-1985) inducted into Pro Football Hall of Fame, in Detroit
- April 8 - Mel Schacher, bassist for Grand Funk Railroad, in Flint, Michigan
- May 5 - John D. Cherry, 62nd Lieutenant Governor of Michigan, in Sulphur Springs, Texas
- September 10 - Gary Danielson, NFL quarterback (1976-1988), in Detroit
- September 18 - Ben Carson, neurosurgeon, 17th United States Secretary of Housing and Urban Development, in Detroit
- October 18 - Pam Dawber, actress (Mork & Mindy, My Sister Sam), in Detroit

=== Gallery of 1951 births ===
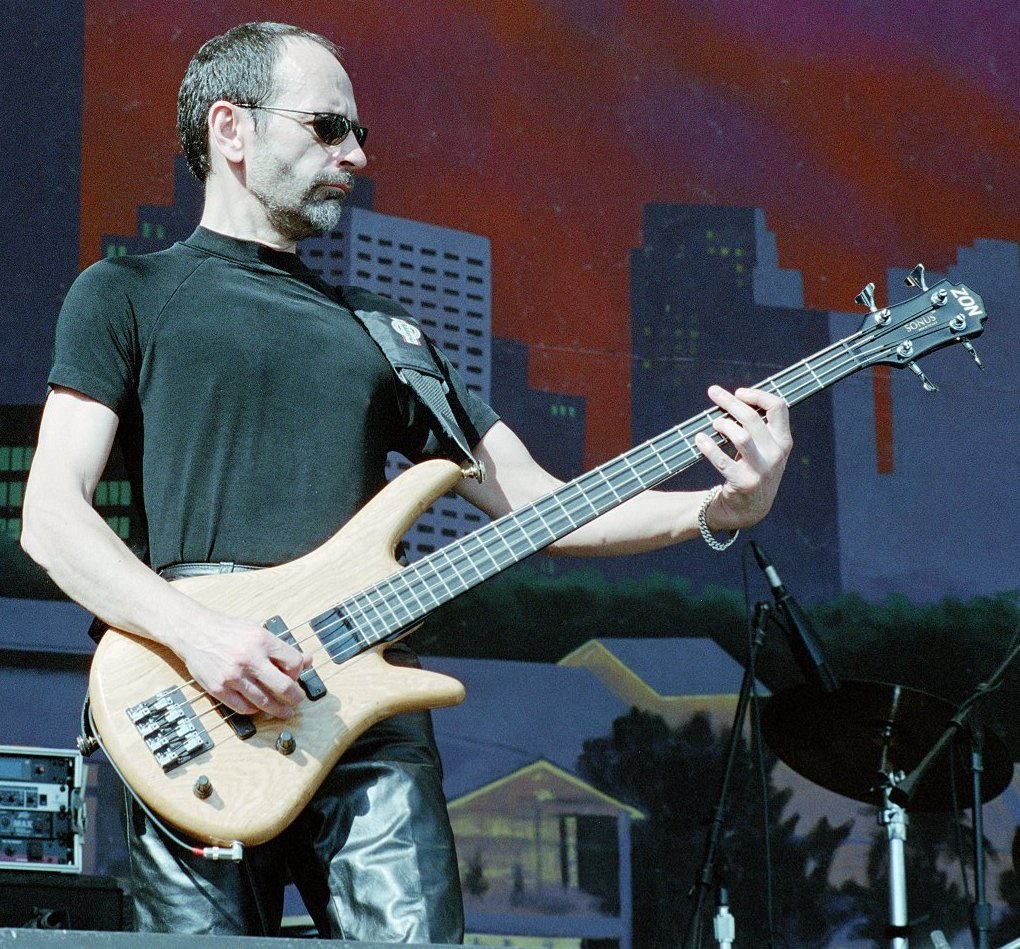
Mel Schacher

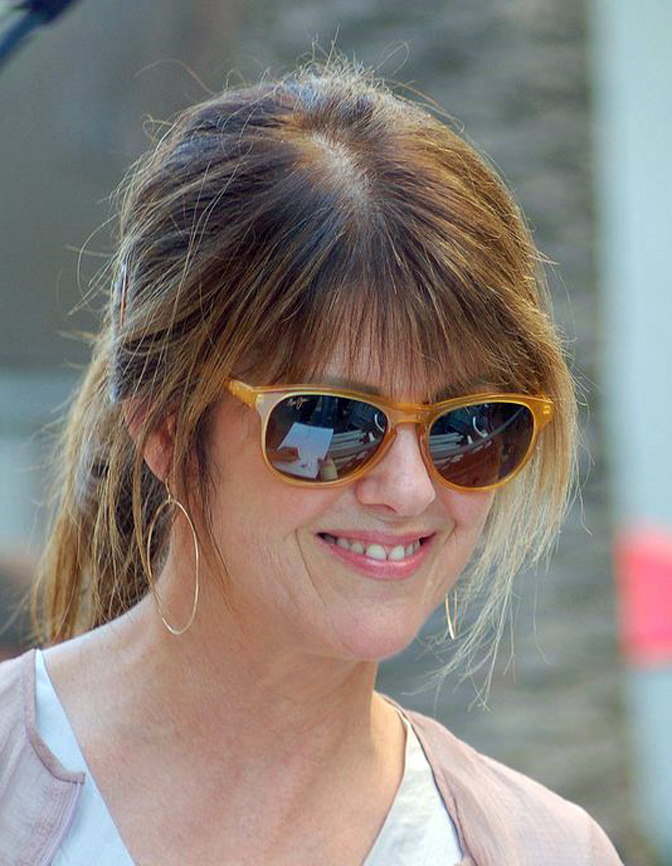
Pam Dawber

== Deaths ==
- April 13 - Wish Egan, baseball player and scout, at age 69 in Detroit
- April 18 - Arthur Vandenberg, U.S. Senator (1928-1951), at age 67 in Grand Rapids, Michigan
- December 21 - David H. Crowley, Michigan Attorney General (1935-1936), at age 69 in Detroit

=== Gallery of 1951 deaths ===
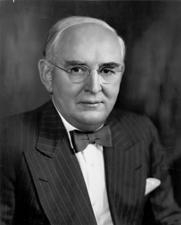
Arthur Vandenberg

== See also ==
- History of Michigan
- History of Detroit
