= 1952 in Michigan =

- Decades: 1930s; 1940s; 1950s; 1960s; 1970s
- See also: History of Michigan; Historical outline of Michigan; List of years in Michigan; 1952 in the United States

Events from the year 1952 in Michigan.

== Top stories ==
The Associated Press polled editors of its member newspapers in Michigan and ranked the state's top news stories of 1952 as follows:

1. April rioting at Michigan State Prison (295 points)
2. November 7 election, including reelection of G. Mennen Williams to a third term as Governor (255 points)
3. Visits to Michigan by Presidential candidates, including Dwight D. Eisenhower
4. Eviction from her home of a Lapeer widow, Elizabeth Stevens, arising from efforts by members of a defunct mutual insurance outfit to resist payment of assessments
5. National championship for 1952 Michigan State Spartans football team
6. The appointment of Michigan men to Eisenhower's cabinet
7. Michigan's "drift toward financial chaos"
8. Water damage and erosion to Michigan's shorelines
9. Hearings held in Detroit by the House Un-American Activities Committee into "the Communist menace" in Michigan
10. 1952 Detroit Tigers season, including the team's collapse and trades of players

The NFL championship won by the 1952 Detroit Lions ranked 18th in the balloting. Two no-hitters by Tigers' pitcher Virgil Trucks in 1952 ranked 19th. The Stanley Cup championship won by the 1951–52 Detroit Red Wings season ranked outside the top 20 stories.

== Office holders ==
=== State office holders ===
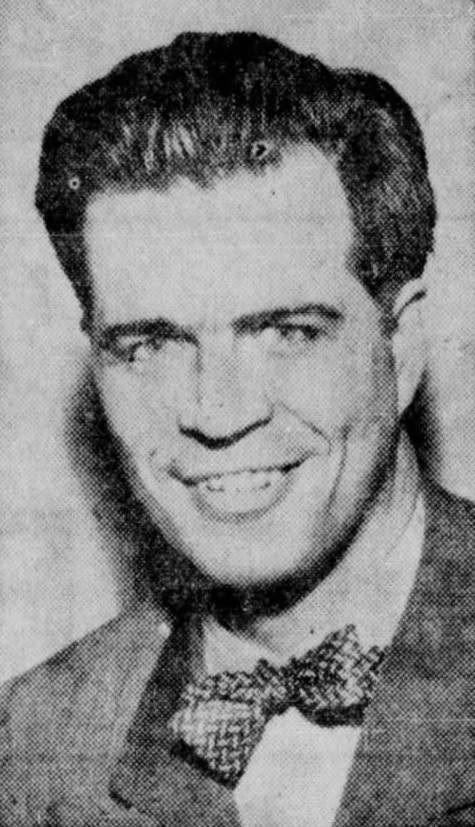
Gov. G. Mennen Williams

- Governor of Michigan: G. Mennen Williams (Democrat)
- Lieutenant Governor of Michigan: William C. Vandenberg (Republican)
- Michigan Attorney General: Frank Millard (Republican)
- Michigan Secretary of State: Frederick M. Alger Jr. (Republican)
- Speaker of the Michigan House of Representatives: Victor A. Knox (Republican)
- Chief Justice, Michigan Supreme Court: Clark J. Adams

=== Mayors of major cities ===
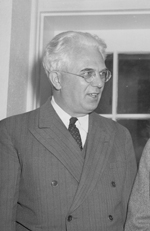
Sen. Homer Ferguson

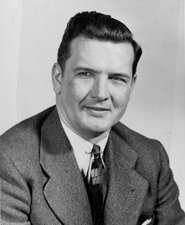
Sen. Blair Moody

- Mayor of Detroit: Albert Cobo (Republican)
- Mayor of Grand Rapids: Paul G. Goebel
- Mayor of Flint: Paul Lovegrove/Donald W. Riegle Sr.
- Mayor of Saginaw: William R. Hart
- Mayor of Dearborn: Orville L. Hubbard
- Mayor of Lansing: Ralph Crego
- Mayor of Ann Arbor: William E. Brown Jr.

=== Federal office holders ===
- U.S. senator from Michigan: Homer S. Ferguson (Republican)
- U.S. senator from Michigan: Arthur H. Vandenberg (Republican)/Blair Moody (Democrat)/Charles E. Potter (Republican)
- House District 1: Thaddeus M. Machrowicz (Democrat)
- House District 2: George Meader (Republican)
- House District 3: Paul W. Shafer (Republican)
- House District 4: Clare Hoffman (Republican)
- House District 5: Gerald Ford (Republican)
- House District 6: William W. Blackney (Republican)
- House District 7: Jesse P. Wolcott (Republican)
- House District 8: Fred L. Crawford (Republican)
- House District 9: Ruth Thompson (Republican)
- House District 10: Roy O. Woodruff (Republican)
- House District 11: Charles E. Potter (Republican)
- House District 12: John B. Bennett (Republican)
- House District 13: George D. O'Brien (Democrat)
- House District 14: Louis C. Rabaut (Democrat)
- House District 15: John Dingell Sr. (Democrat)
- House District 16: John Lesinski Jr. (Democrat)
- House District 17: George Anthony Dondero (Republican)

== Population ==
In the 1950 United States census, Michigan was recorded as having a population of 6,421,000 persons, ranking as the seventh most populous state in the country. By 1960, the state's population had grown 22.8% to 7,823,194 persons.

=== Cities ===
The following is a list of cities in Michigan with a population of at least 40,000 based on 1950 U.S. Census data. Historic census data from 1940 and 1960 is included to reflect trends in population increases or decreases. Cities that are part of the Detroit metropolitan area are shaded in tan.

1950 Rank	City	County	1940 Pop.	1950 Pop.	1960 Pop.	Change 1950-60
1	Detroit	Wayne	1,623,452	1,849,568	1,670,144	−9.7%
2	Grand Rapids	Kent	164,292	176,515	177,313	0.5%
3	Flint	Genesee	151,543	163,143	196,940	20.7%
4	Dearborn	Wayne	63,589	94,994	112,007	17.9%
5	Saginaw	Saginaw	82,794	92,918	98,265	5.8%
6	Lansing	Ingham	78,753	92,129	107,807	17.0%
7	Pontiac	Oakland	66,626	73,681	82,233	11.6%
8	Kalamazoo	Kalamazoo	54,097	57,704	82,089	42.4%
9	Bay City	Bay	47,956	52,523	53,604	2.1%
10	Jackson	Jackson	49,656	51,088	50,720	−0.7%
11	Battle Creek	Calhoun	43,453	48,666	44,169	−9.2%
12	Muskegon	Muskegon	47,697	48,429	46,485	−4.0%
13	Ann Arbor	Washtenaw	29,815	48,251	67,340	39.6%
14	Royal Oak	Oakland	25,087	46,898	80,612	71.9%
15	Warren	Macomb	23,658	42,653	89,246	109.2%

=== Counties ===
The following is a list of counties in Michigan with populations of at least 100,000 based on 1950 U.S. Census data. Historic census data from 1940 and 1960 are included to reflect trends in population increases or decreases. Counties that are part of the Detroit metropolitan area are shaded in tan.

1980 Rank	County	Largest city	1940 Pop.	1950 Pop.	1960 Pop.	Change 1950-60
1	Wayne	Detroit	2,015,623	2,435,235	2,666,297	9.5%
2	Oakland	Pontiac	254,068	396,001	690,259	74.3%
3	Kent	Grand Rapids	246,338	288,292	363,187	26.0%
4	Genesee	Flint	227,944	270,963	374,313	38.1%
5	Macomb	Warren	107,638	184,961	405,804	119.4%
6	Ingham	Lansing	130,616	172,941	211,296	22.2%
7	Saginaw	Saginaw	130,468	153,515	190,752	24.3%
8	Washtenaw	Ann Arbor	80,810	134,606	172,440	28.1%
9	Kalamazoo	Kalamazoo	100,085	126,707	169,712	33.9%
10	Muskegon	Muskegon	94,501	121,545	129,943	6.9%
11	Calhoun	Battle Creek	94,206	120,813	138,858	14.9%
12	Berrien	Benton Harbor	89,117	115,702	149,865	29.5%
13	Jackson	Jackson	93,108	108,168	131,994	22.0%

== Sports ==
=== Baseball ===
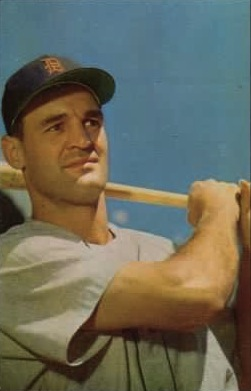
Walt Dropo

- 1952 Detroit Tigers season – Under managers Red Rolfe and Fred Hutchinson, the Tigers compiled a 50–104 record and finished in last place in the American League. The team's statistical leaders included Johnny Groth with a .284 batting average, Walt Dropo with 23 home runs and 70 RBIs, Ted Gray with 12 wins, and Hal White with a 3.69 earned run average.
- 1952 Michigan Wolverines baseball season – Under head coach Ray Fisher, the Wolverines compiled a 16–7 record and tied for the Big Ten Conference championship. Bruce Haynam was the team captain.

=== American football ===
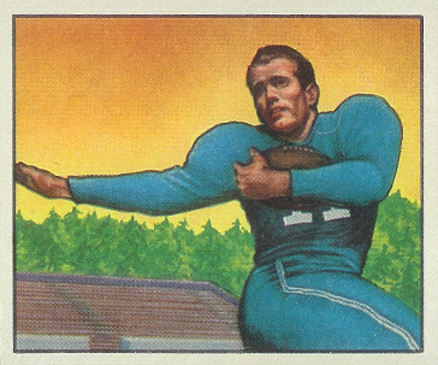
Cloyce Box

- 1952 Detroit Lions season – Under head coach Buddy Parker, the Lions compiled a 9–3 record, finished in first place in the NFL Western Conference, and defeated the Cleveland Browns in the 1952 NFL Championship Game. The team's statistical leaders included Bobby Layne with 1,999 passing yards, Robert Hoernschemeyer with 457 rushing yards, Cloyce Box with 924 receiving yards and 90 points scored (15 receiving touchdowns).
- 1952 Michigan State Spartans football team – Under head coach Biggie Munn, the Spartans compiled a 9–0 record and were ranked No. 1 in the final AP Poll.
- 1952 Michigan Wolverines football team – Under head coach Bennie Oosterbaan, the Wolverines finished in a tie for fourth place in the Big Ten Conference with a record of 5–4.
- 1952 Central Michigan Chippewas football team – Under head coach Kenneth "Bill" Kelly, the Chippewas compiled a 7–2 record and won the Interstate Intercollegiate Athletic Conference (IIAC) championship.
- 1952 Detroit Titans football team – The Titans compiled a 3–6 record under head coach Dutch Clark.
- 1952 Michigan State Normal Hurons football team – Under head coach Fred Trosko, the Hurons compiled a 5–3–1 record.
- 1952 Western Michigan Broncos football team – Under head coach John Gill, the Broncos compiled a 4–4 record.

=== Basketball ===
- 1951–52 Michigan Wolverines men's basketball team – Under head coach Ernie McCoy, the Wolverines compiled a 7–15 record. James Skala was the team's leading scorer with 258 points in 22 games for an average of 11.7 points per game.
- 1951–52 Michigan State Spartans men's basketball team – Under head coach Pete Newell, the Spartans compiled a 13–9 record.
- 1951–52 Detroit Titans men's basketball team – The Titans compiled a 14–12 record under head coach Bob Calihan.
- 1951–52 Western Michigan Broncos men's basketball team – Under head coach William Perigo, the Broncos compiled a 16–8 record.

=== Ice hockey ===
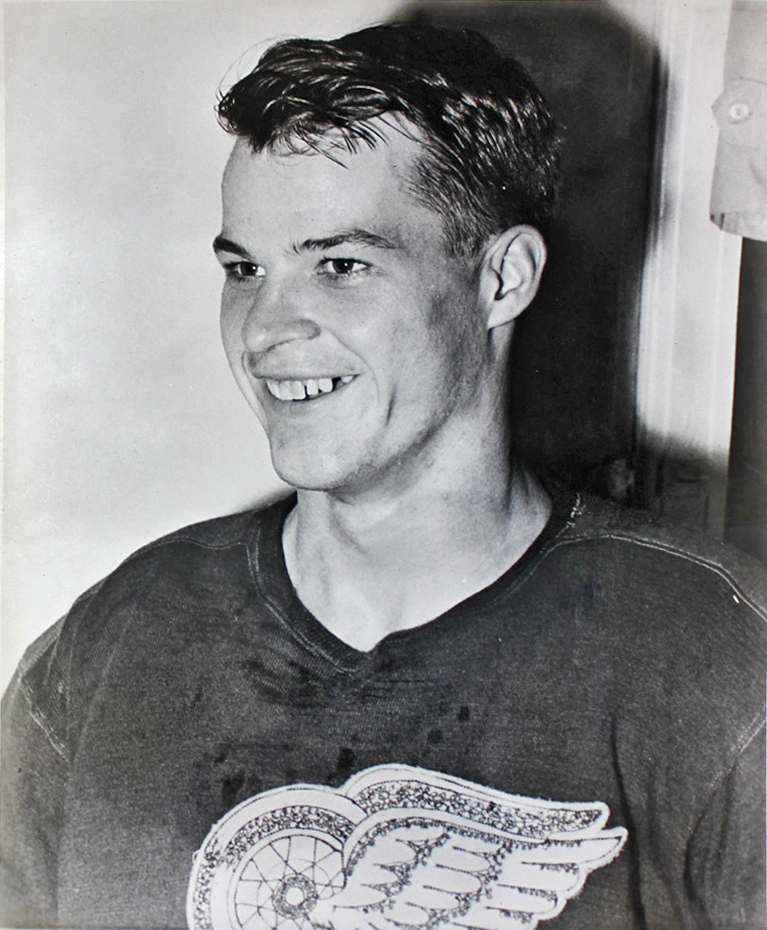
Gordie Howe

- 1951–52 Detroit Red Wings season – Under head coach Tommy Ivan, the Red Wings compiled a 44–14–12 record, finished in first place in the National Hockey League, and defeated the Montreal Canadiens in four games in the 1952 Stanley Cup Finals. Gordie Howe led the team with 47 goals, 39 assists, and 86 points. Ted Lindsay tie for the team lead with 39 assists. The team's goaltender was Terry Sawchuk.
- 1951–52 Michigan Wolverines men's ice hockey season – Under head coach Vic Heyliger, the team compiled a 22–4 record and won the 1952 NCAA Division I Men's Ice Hockey Tournament, the Wolverines' second of three consecutive NCAA hockey championships.
- 1951–52 Michigan State Spartans men's ice hockey team – Under head coach Amo Bessone, the Spartans compiled a 7–13 record.
- 1951–52 Michigan Tech Huskies men's ice hockey team – Under head coach Al Renfrew, Michigan Tech compiled a 2–18 record.

=== Boat racing ===
- Port Huron to Mackinac Boat Race –
- APBA Gold Cup – Stan Dollar

=== Golfing ===
- Michigan Open – Mike Dietz
- Motor City Open - Cary Middlecoff

== Births ==
- February 25 – James A. Barcia, U.S. congressman (1993–2003), in Bay City, Michigan
- April 10 – Steven Seagal, actor (Under Siege, Hard to Kill, The Glimmer Man) and martial artist, in Lansing, Michigan
- April 16 – Billy West, voice actor, musician, singer and songwriter, in Detroit
- May 15 – Dave Brandon, CEO of Domino's Pizza (1999–2009), University of Michigan athletic director (2010–2014), in Dearborn, Michigan
- June 12 – Spencer Abraham, Governor of Michigan (1995–2001), Secretary of Energy (2001–2005), in East Lansing, Michigan
- July 15 – Terry O'Quinn, actor (Lost, The Stepfather Millennium), in Sault Ste. Marie, Michigan
- August 31 – Kim Kashkashian, Grammy-winning classical violinist, in Detroit
- September 13 – Don Was, musician and record producer who led the funk rock band Was (Not Was), in Detroit
- November 28 – S. Epatha Merkerson, Emmy-winning actress (Law & Order, Chicago Med), in Saginaw, Michigan

=== Gallery of 1952 births ===
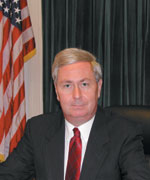
James A. Barcia

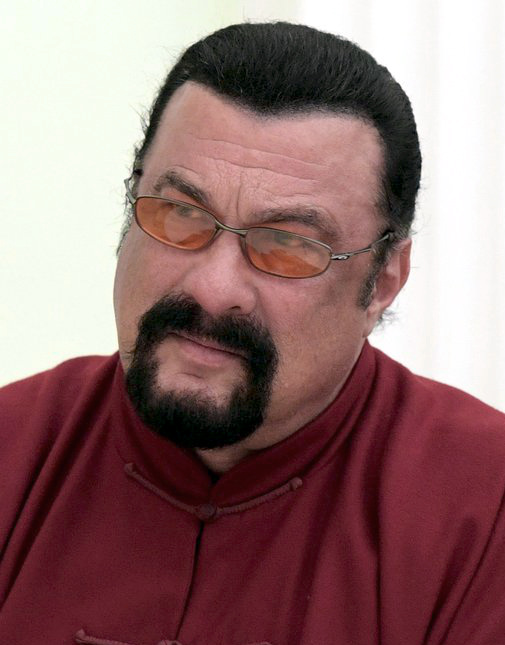
Steven Seagall

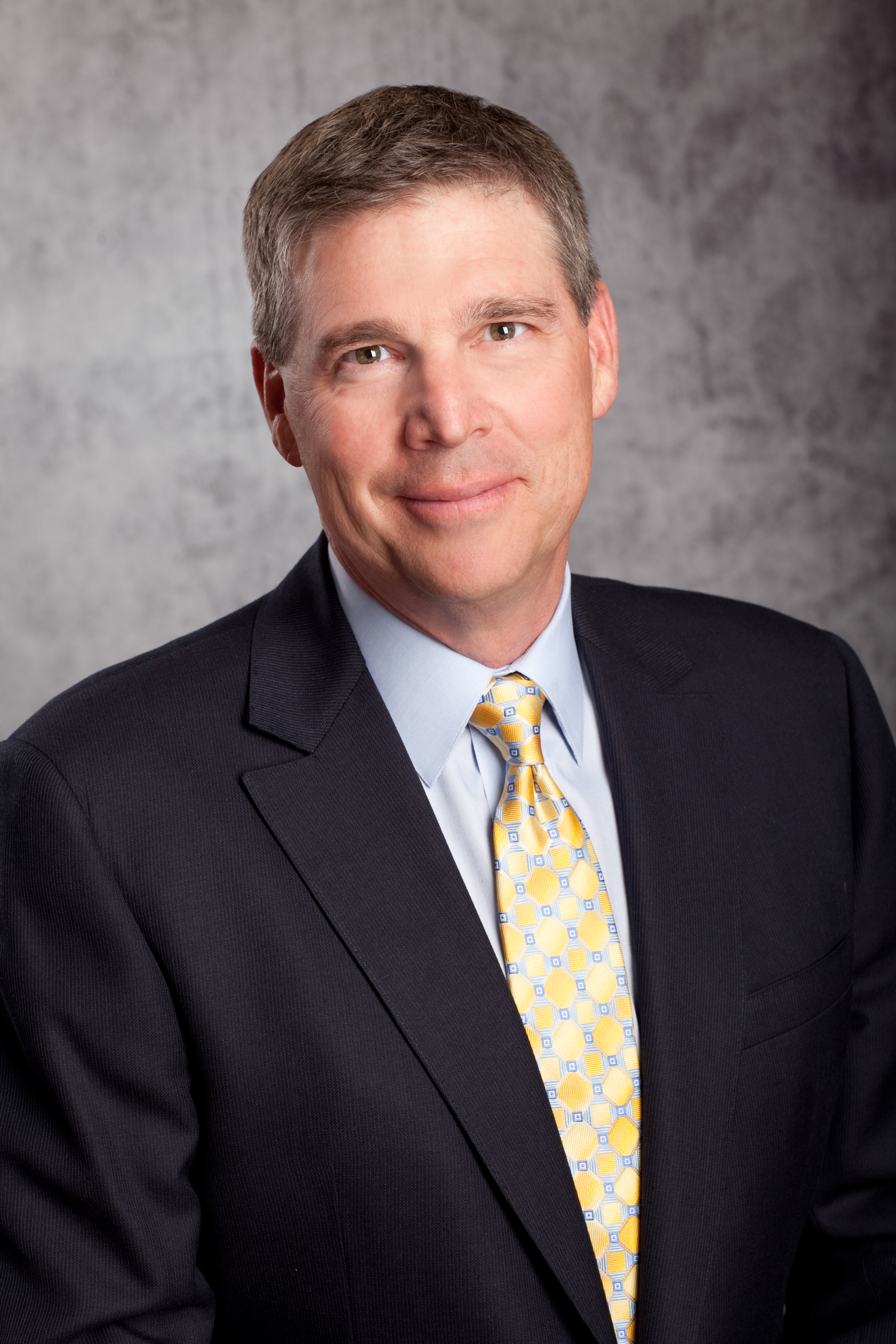
Dave Brandon

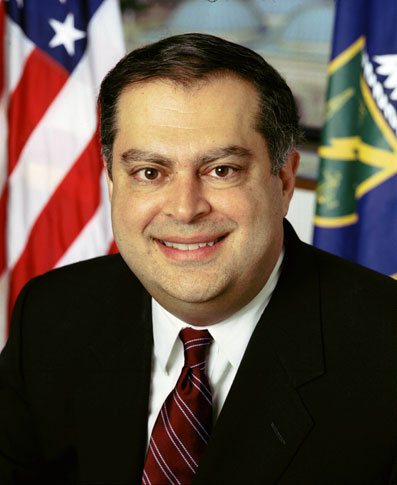
Spencer Abraham

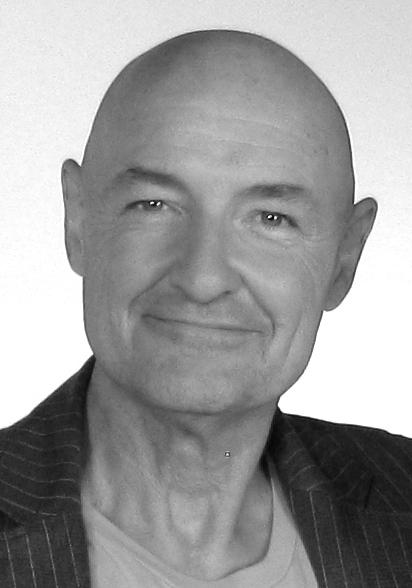
Terry O'Quinn

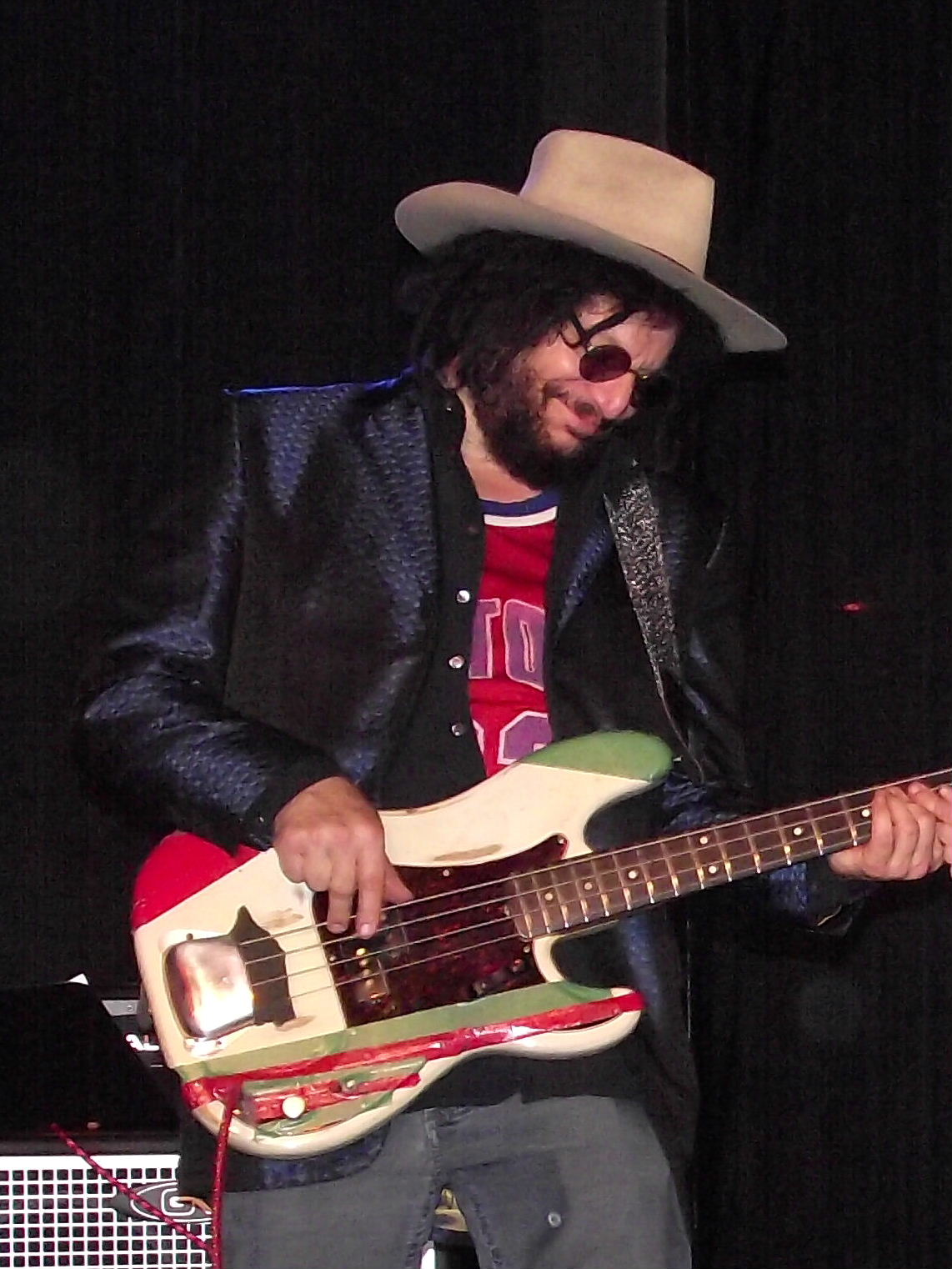
Don Was

== Deaths ==
- January 17 – Walter Briggs Sr., owner of Briggs Manufacturing Company and the Detroit Tigers, at age 74 in Miami Beach, Florida
- March 22 – Tod Rockwell, American football player and coach and sportswriter, at Scott Field, Illinois, at age 52

== See also ==
- History of Michigan
- History of Detroit
