= 1949 in Michigan =

- Decades: 1920s; 1930s; 1940s; 1950s; 1960s
- See also: History of Michigan; Historical outline of Michigan; List of years in Michigan; 1949 in the United States

Events from the year 1949 in Michigan.

== Top stories ==
The Associated Press polled editors of its member newspapers in Michigan and ranked the state's top news stories of 1949 as follows:

1. The March 1 "lonely hearts" murders of a widow and her three-year-old granddaughter in Grand Rapids. The killers were Raymond Fernandez and Martha Beck. (274 points)
2. The shooting UAW leader Victor G. Reuther (224 points)
3. A historic contract between the UAW and Ford Motor granting pensions to workers (175 points)
4. The speed-up strike against Ford that began in May and lasted 26 days (169 points)
5. The July 19 death of U.S. Supreme Court Justice and former Michigan Governor Frank Murphy (129 points)
6. Record production by the automobile industry and shutdowns resulting from the steelworkers strike (115)
7. The March 31 death of Willard Dow, president of Dow Chemical, and his wife and three others in a plane crash (98)
8. Farmer in Waterford shoots 10 people with a shotgun (88)
9. The "social reform" program of Governor G. Mennen Williams and political battles to institute it (87)
10. The end of Michigan's one-man grand juries (86)

== Office holders ==
=== State office holders ===
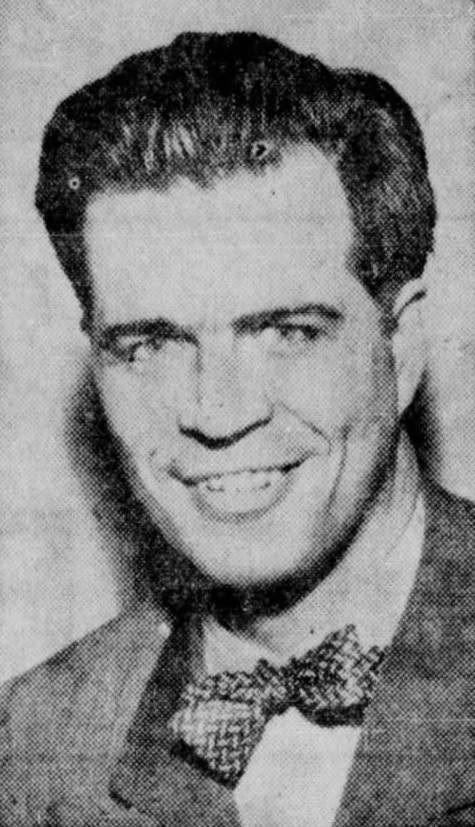
Gov. G. Mennen Williams

- Governor of Michigan: G. Mennen Williams (Democrat)
- Lieutenant Governor of Michigan: John W. Connolly (Democrat)
- Michigan Attorney General: Stephen John Roth
- Michigan Secretary of State: Frederick M. Alger Jr. (Republican)
- Speaker of the Michigan House of Representatives: Victor A. Knox (Republican)
- Chief Justice, Michigan Supreme Court: Edward M. Sharpe

=== Mayors of major cities ===
- Mayor of Detroit: Eugene Van Antwerp (Democrat)
- Mayor of Grand Rapids: George W. Welsh (Republican)/Stanley J. Davis (Democrat)
- Mayor of Flint: George G. Wills
- Mayor of Dearborn: Orville L. Hubbard
- Mayor of Saginaw: Harold J. Stenglein/Edwin W. Koepke
- Mayor of Lansing: Ralph Crego
- Mayor of Ann Arbor: William E. Brown Jr.

=== Federal office holders ===
- U.S. Senator from Michigan: Homer S. Ferguson (Republican)
- U.S. Senator from Michigan: Arthur Vandenberg (Republican)
- House District 1: George G. Sadowski (Democrat)
- House District 2: Earl C. Michener (Republican)
- House District 3: Paul W. Shafer (Republican)
- House District 4: Clare Hoffman (Republican)
- House District 5: Gerald Ford (Republican)
- House District 6: William W. Blackney (Republican)
- House District 7: Jesse P. Wolcott (Republican)
- House District 8: Fred L. Crawford (Republican)
- House District 9: Albert J. Engel (Republican)
- House District 10: Roy O. Woodruff (Republican)
- House District 11: Charles E. Potter (Republican)
- House District 12: John B. Bennett (Republican)
- House District 13: George D. O'Brien (Democrat)
- House District 14: Louis C. Rabaut (Democrat)
- House District 15: John D. Dingell Sr. (Democrat)
- House District 16: John Lesinski Sr. (Democrat)
- House District 17: George Anthony Dondero (Republican)

== Population ==
In the 1940 United States census, Michigan was recorded as having a population of 5,256,106, ranking as the seventh most populous state in the country. By 1950, Michigan's population had increased by 21.2% to 6,371,766.

=== Cities ===
The following is a list of cities in Michigan with a population of at least 20,000 based on 1940 U.S. Census data. Historic census data from 1930 and 1950 is included to reflect trends in population increases or decreases. Cities that are part of the Detroit metropolitan area are shaded in tan.

1940 Rank	City	County	1940 Pop.	1946 Est.	1950 Pop.	Change 1940-50
1	Detroit	Wayne	1,623,452	1,815,000	1,849,568	13.9%
2	Grand Rapids	Kent	164,292		176,515	7.4%
3	Flint	Genesee	151,543		163,143	7.7%
4	Saginaw	Saginaw	82,794		92,918	12.2%
5	Lansing	Ingham	78,753	90,000	92,129	17.0%
6	Pontiac	Oakland	66,626		73,681	10.6%
7	Dearborn	Wayne	63,589		94,994	49.4%
8	Kalamazoo	Kalamazoo	54,097		57,704	6.7%
9	Highland Park	Wayne	50,810		46,393	−8.7%
10	Hamtramck	Wayne	49,839	48,938	43,555	−12.6%
11	Jackson	Jackson	49,656		51,088	2.9%
12	Bay City	Bay	47,956		52,523	9.5%
13	Muskegon	Muskegon	47,697		48,429	1.5%
14	Battle Creek	Calhoun	43,453		48,666	12.0%
15	Port Huron	St. Clair	32,759		35,725	9.1%
16	Wyandotte	Wayne	30,618		36,846	20.3%
17	Ann Arbor	Washtenaw	29,815		48,251	61.8%
18	Royal Oak	Oakland	25,087		46,898	86.9%
19	Ferndale	Oakland	22,523		29,675	31.8%

=== Counties ===
The following is a list of counties in Michigan with populations of at least 75,000 based on 1940 U.S. Census data. Historic census data from 1930 and 1950 are included to reflect trends in population increases or decreases.

1940 Rank	County	Largest city	1930 Pop.	1940 Pop.	1950 Pop.	Change 1940-50
1	Wayne	Detroit	1,888,946	2,015,623	2,435,235	20.8%
2	Oakland	Pontiac	211,251	254,068	396,001	55.9%
3	Kent	Grand Rapids	240,511	246,338	288,292	17.0%
4	Genesee	Flint	211,641	227,944	270,963	18.9%
5	Ingham	Lansing	116,587	130,616	172,941	32.4%
6	Saginaw	Saginaw	120,717	130,468	153,515	17.7%
7	Macomb	Warren	77,146	107,638	184,961	71.8%
8	Kalamazoo	Kalamazoo	91,368	100,085	126,707	26.6%
9	Jackson	Jackson	92,304	93,108	108,168	16.2%
10	Muskegon	Muskegon	84,630	94,501	121,545	28.6%
11	Calhoun	Battle Creek	87,043	94,206	120,813	28.2%

== Companies ==
The following is a list of major companies based in Michigan in 1949.

Company	1949 sales (millions)	1949 net earnings (millions)	Headquarters	Core business
General Motors			Detroit	Automobiles
Ford Motor Company	na	na		Automobiles
Chrysler				Automobiles
Studebaker Corp.				Automobiles
Briggs Mfg. Co.			Detroit	Automobile parts supplier
S. S. Kresge				Retail
Hudson Motor Car Co.			Detroit	Automobiles
Detroit Edison				Electric utility
Michigan Bell				Telephone utility
Kellogg's			Battle Creek	Breakfast cereal
Parke-Davis			Detroit	Pharmaceutical
REO Motor Car Co.			Lansing	Automobiles
Burroughs Adding Machine				Business machines

== Sports ==
=== Baseball ===
- 1949 Detroit Tigers season –
- 1949 Michigan Wolverines baseball season - Under head coach Ray Fisher, the Wolverines compiled an 18–9–2 record and tied for the Big Ten Conference championship. Harold Raymond was the team captain.

=== American football ===
- 1949 Detroit Lions season –
- 1949 Michigan Wolverines football team –
- 1949 Michigan State Spartans football team –
- 1949 Detroit Titans football team –

=== Basketball ===
- 1948–49 Michigan Wolverines men's basketball team –

=== Ice hockey ===
- 1948–49 Detroit Red Wings season –

=== Boat racing ===
- APBA Gold Cup – Bill Cantrell
- Harmsworth Cup – Stan Dollar
- Port Huron to Mackinac Boat Race –

=== Golfing ===
- Motor City Open - Lloyd Mangrum and Cary Middlecoff
- Michigan Open - Al Watrous

== Births ==
- January 14 - Lawrence Kasdan, screenwriter (The Empire Strikes Back, Raiders of the Lost Ark, Return of the Jedi, The Big Chill), director and producer, in Detroit
- January 15 - Bobby Grich, Major League Baseball second baseman (1970–1986), in Muskegon, Michigan
- August 9 - Ted Simmons, Major League Baseball catcher (1968–1988) and 8× All-Star, in Highland Park, Michigan

== Deaths ==
- April 11 - Chase Osborn, 27th Governor of Michigan (1911-1913), at age 89 in Poulan, Georgia
- June 16 - William Comstock, 33rd Governor of Michigan (1933-1935), at age 71 in Detroit
- July 19 - Frank Murphy, Associate Justice of the Supreme Court of the United States (1940-1949), 35th Governor of Michigan (1937-1939), at age 59 in Detroit

== See also ==
- History of Michigan
- History of Detroit
