= Kenneth Kelly =

American athlete and coach (1905–1984)

Biographical details
- Born: June 1, 1905; Bowling Green, Ohio, U.S.
- Died: March 7, 1984 (aged 78); Lakeland, Florida, U.S.

Playing career

Football
- 1926–1929: Central Michigan

Basketball
- 1927–1930: Central Michigan
- Position: Quarterback (football)

Coaching career (HC unless noted)

Football
- 1930–1937: Cass City HS (MI)
- 1938–1941: Mount Pleasant HS (MI)
- 1942–1950: Arthur Hill HS (MI)
- 1951–1966: Central Michigan

Basketball
- 1954–1956: Central Michigan

Head coaching record
- Overall: 91–58–2 (college football); 23–20 (college basketball)

Accomplishments and honors

Championships
- Football; 7 IIAC (1952–1956, 1963, 1966)

Kenneth A. "Wild Bill" Kelly (June 1, 1905 – March 7, 1984) was an American football, basketball, and tennis player and coach. He served as the head football coach at Central Michigan University from 1951 to 1966, compiling a record of 91–58–2, and the head basketball coach at Central Michigan for two seasons from 1954 to 1956, tallying a mark of 23–20. Kelly/Shorts Stadium, the home field of the Central Michigan Chippewas football program, was renamed in Kelly's honor in 1983. Kelly died on March 7, 1984, at the age of 78.

== Head coaching record ==
=== College football ===
Year	Team	Overall	Conference	Standing	Bowl/playoffs
Central Michigan Chippewas (Interstate Intercollegiate Athletic Conference) (1951–1966)
1951	Central Michigan	5–3	4–2	3rd	
1952	Central Michigan	7–2	6–0	1st	
1953	Central Michigan	7–1–1	5–0–1	1st	
1954	Central Michigan	8–2	5–1	T–1st	
1955	Central Michigan	8–1	5–1	T–1st	
1956	Central Michigan	9–0	6–0	1st	
1957	Central Michigan	4–6	4–2	T–2nd	
1958	Central Michigan	7–3	4–2	T–2nd	
1959	Central Michigan	7–3	4–2	T–2nd	
1960	Central Michigan	3–5	3–3	4th	
1961	Central Michigan	2–8	1–5	6th	
1962	Central Michigan	6–4	4–0	1st	
1963	Central Michigan	4–5–1	2–2	3rd	
1964	Central Michigan	4–5	1–3	T–4th	
1965	Central Michigan	5–5	3–1	2nd	
1966	Central Michigan	5–5	3–0	1st	
Central Michigan:		91–58–2	70–24–1		
Total:		91–58–2			
National championship Conference title Conference division title or championship game berth
