= Ralph Crego =

American politician (1893–1989)

Mayor of Lansing, Michigan
- In office August 1943 – April 1961
- Preceded by: Sam Street Hughes
- Succeeded by: Willard I. Bowerman Jr.

Personal details
- Born: September 2, 1893 Fife Lake, Michigan
- Died: May 28, 1989 (aged 95) East Lansing, Michigan

Ralph William Crego (September 2, 1893 – May 28, 1989) was an American politician who served as Mayor of Lansing, Michigan from 1943 to 1961.

Crego was born at Fife Lake, Michigan, and moved to Lansing at age 21. He attended Lansing Business University and worked for Oldsmobile before joining the United States Marine Corps during World War I. After his military service, Crego opened a grocery store at 1016 W. Allegan in Lansing which he operated for 24 years. He was elected to the Lansing City Council in November 1935.

Crego became acting mayor in August 1943 when Mayor Sam Street Hughes entered the military. In November 1943, he was elected Mayor by a margin of nearly five-to-one over his opponent. During his time as mayor, Lansing's population grew by more than 35% with a population of 78,753 in 1940 and 107,807 in 1960. In his 1956 State of the City message, he predicted Lansing's 1970 population would grow to 130,000, citing the need for increased street and parking infrastructure. Crego oversaw construction of many city buildings as mayor, including City Hall, the police station, and four fire stations. In April 1961, he lost a bid for re-election by 62 votes (out of 28,087 ballots cast) but did not seek a recount. With nearly 18 years in office, he remains Lansing's longest-serving mayor.

Crego was married for 71 years to his wife, Marjorie. They had four children. Two of their children died from polio: Dwight (age 8 in 1928) and Mary Lou (age 10 in 1931). He had two more children, Joanne Hacker and David Crego.

Crego died in 1989 at age 95.

== Crego Park ==
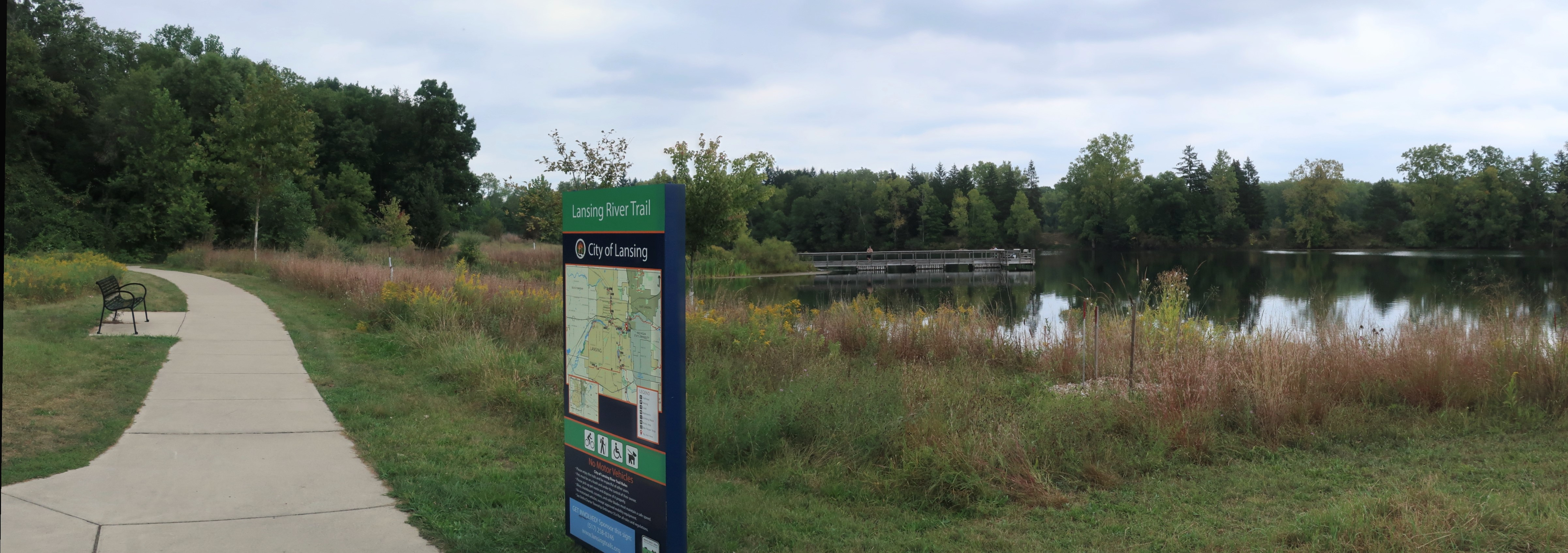

In 1970, at the unanimous urging of the Lansing City Council, the Lansing Park Board honored Crego by naming a large park in the Red Cedar basin, the largest park in the city, as Ralph W. Crego Park. By 1974, the park had expanded to 800 acres. The park was closed in 1986 after toxic waste was discovered; it remained closed for 28 years, reopening in 2014.
