= William E. Brown Jr. =

American politician

Mayor of Ann Arbor
- In office 1945–1957
- Preceded by: Leigh J. Young
- Succeeded by: Samuel J. Eldersveld

Personal details
- Born: May 1, 1896 Lapeer, Michigan, US
- Died: December 8, 1970 (aged 74)
- Party: Republican

Military service
- Allegiance: United States
- Branch/service: United States Army
- Battles/wars: World War I

William Ellis Brown Jr. (May 1, 1896 – December 8, 1970) was a Michigan politician.

Brown was born on May 1, 1896, in Lapeer, Michigan, to parents William E. Brown Sr. and Grace Brown. Brown served in the United States Army during World War I.

Brown was an automobile dealer and worked in the insurance business. Brown served as the mayor of Ann Arbor, Michigan, from 1945 until 1957, when he was not re-elected. Brown was a Republican.

Brown married Eleanor Shartel on October 12, 1920. Brown was a member of the Benevolent and Protective Order of Elks and was Presbyterian.

Brown died on December 8, 1970. He was interred at Forest Hill Cemetery in Ann Arbor, Michigan.
