= List of mayors of Lansing, Michigan =

== List ==
Lansing, Michigan, was incorporated as a city on February 15, 1859.

- Hiram H. Smith, 1859
- John A. Kerr, 1860
- William H. Chapman, 1861–62
- Dr. Ira H. Bartholomew, 1863–65
- Dr. William H. Haze, 1866
- George W. Peck, 1867
- Cyrus Hewitt, 1868–69
- Dr. Solomon W. Wright, 1870
- John Robson, 1871 and 1881
- John S. Tooker, 1872–73 and 1876
- Daniel W. Buck, 1874–75 and 1886
- Orlando Mack Barnes, 1877
- Joseph E. Warner, 1878
- William Van Buren, 1879–80
- Orlando F. Barnes, 1882–83
- William Donovan, 1884–85
- Jacob F. Schultz, 1887
- John Crotty, 1888
- James M. Turner, 1889 and 1895
- Frank B. Johnson, 1890–91
- Arthur O. Bement, 1892–93
- Alroy A. Wilbur, 1894
- Russell C. Ostrander, 1896
- Charles J. Davis, 1897–99
- James F. Hammell, 1900–03
- Hugh Lyons, 1904–07
- John S. Bennett, 1908–11
- J. Gottlieb Reutter, 1912–17
- Jacob W. Ferle, 1918–19 and 1922
- Benjamin A. Kyes, 1920–21
- Silas F. Main, 1922–23
- Alfred H. Doughty, 1923–26
- Laird J. Troyer, 1927–30
- Peter F. Gray, 1931–32
- Max A. Templeton, 1933–41
- Arthur E. Stoppel, 1941
- Sam Street Hughes, 1941–42
- Ralph Crego, 1943–61
- Willard I. Bowerman, Jr., 1961–65
- Max E. Murninghan, 1965–69
- Gerald W. Graves, 1969–81
- Terry John McKane, 1981–92
- Jim Crawford, 1992–93
- David Hollister, 1993–2003
- Antonio Benavides, 2003–2006
- Virgil Bernero, 2006–2018
- Andy Schor, 2018–Present

== Additional sources ==
- The State Journal newspaper; Lansing, Michigan; April 28, 1955; Centennial Issue; pages C-12 to C-18.
- Early Lansing History, book by James P. Edmonds, 1944, pages 26–27.
- Out of a Wilderness: an illustrated history of greater Lansing, book by Justin L. Kestenbaum, 1981, page 184.
- Lansing and its yesterdays; a compilation of a portion of the historical material published in the seventy-fifth edition of the Lansing State Journal, January 1, 1930; page 133.
