= 1875 in Michigan =

- Decades: 1850s; 1860s; 1870s; 1880s; 1890s
- See also: History of Michigan; Historical outline of Michigan; List of years in Michigan; 1875 in the United States

Events from the year 1875 in Michigan.

== Office holders ==
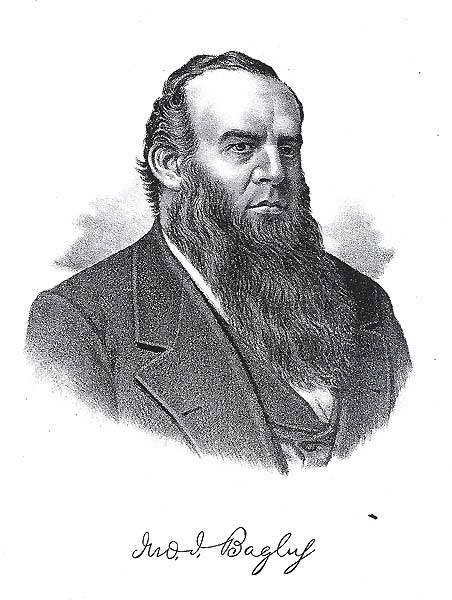
Gov. Bagley

=== State office holders ===
- Governor of Michigan: John J. Bagley (Republican)
- Lieutenant Governor of Michigan: Henry H. Holt (Republican)
- Michigan Attorney General: Isaac Marston/Andrew J. Smith
- Michigan Secretary of State: Daniel Striker/Ebenezer G. D. Holden
- State Land Commissioner: Leverett A. Clapp
- Speaker of the Michigan House of Representatives: John Philo Hoyt (Republican)
- Chief Justice, Michigan Supreme Court: Benjamin F. Graves

=== Mayors of major cities ===
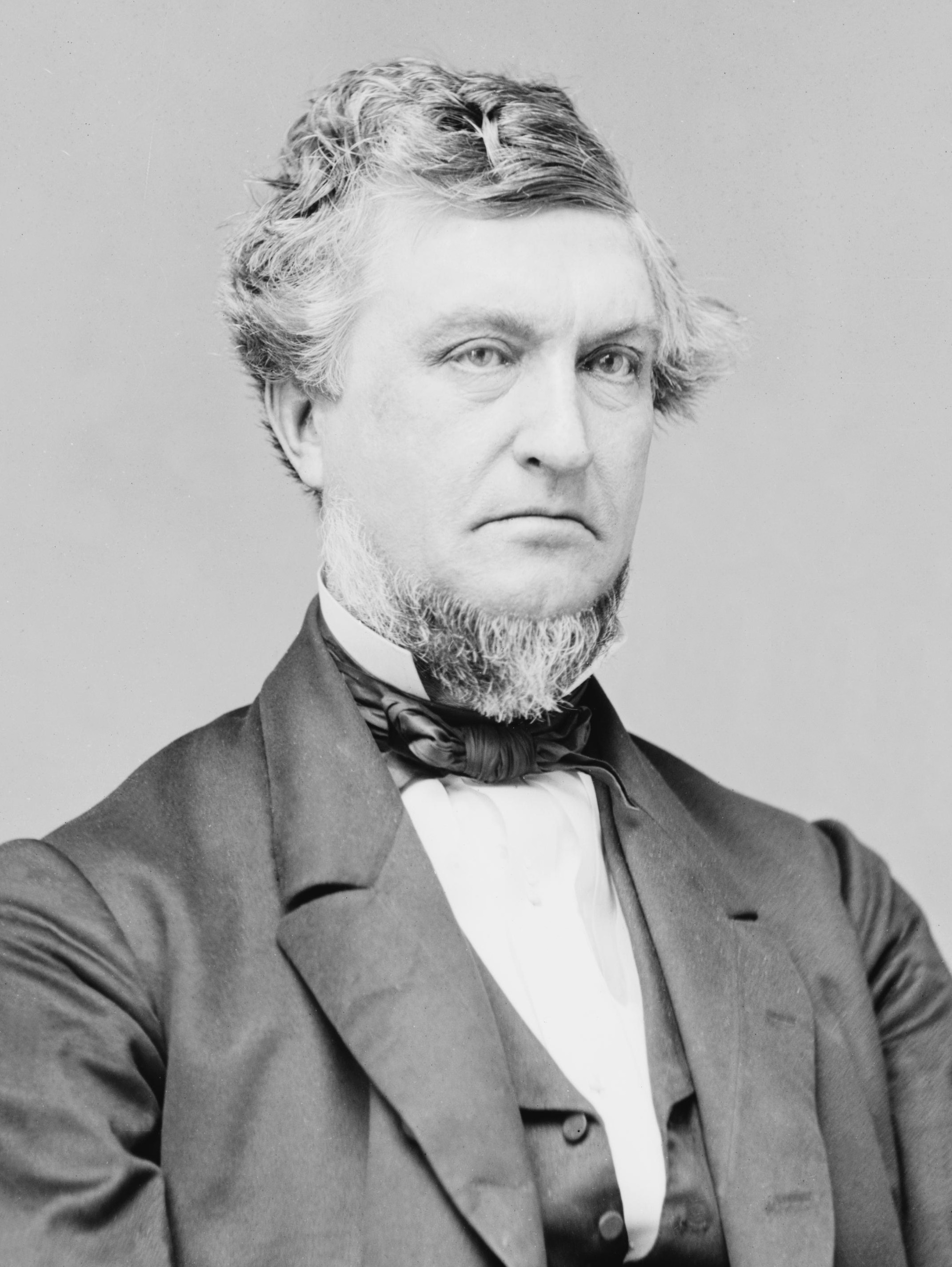
Sen. Chandler

- Mayor of Detroit: Hugh Moffat (Republican)
- Mayor of Grand Rapids: Julius Houseman
- Mayor of Flint: George H. Durand/Alexander McFarland
- Mayor of Saginaw: Chauncey W. Wisner
- Mayor of Lansing, Michigan: Daniel W. Buck
- Mayor of Ann Arbor: Hiram J. Beakes/Edward D. Kinne

=== Federal office holders ===
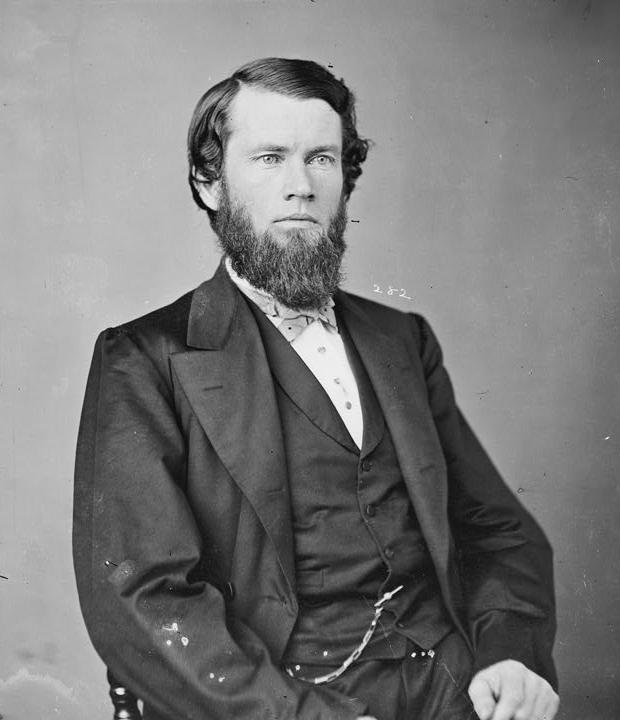
Sen. Ferry

- U.S. Senator from Michigan: Zachariah Chandler (Republican)/Isaac P. Christiancy
- U.S. Senator from Michigan: Thomas W. Ferry (Republican)
- House District 1: Alpheus S. Williams (Democrat)
- House District 2: Henry Waldron (Republican)
- House District 3: George Willard (Republican)
- House District 4: Julius C. Burrows (Republican)/Allen Potter
- House District 5: William B. Williams (Republican)
- House District 6: Josiah Begole/George H. Durand (Democrat)
- House District 7: Omar D. Conger (Republican)
- House District 8: Nathan B. Bradley (Republican)
- House District 9: Jay Abel Hubbell (Republican)

== Population ==
In the 1870 United States census, Michigan was recorded as having a population of 1,184,059. By 1880, Michigan's population had increased by 38.2% to 1,636,937.

=== Cities ===
The following is a list of cities in Michigan with a population of at least 5,000 based on 1870 U.S. Census data. Historic census data from 1860 and 1880 is included to reflect trends in population increases or decreases. Where available, figures from the 1874 Michigan state census are also included

1870 Rank	City	County	1860	1870	1874	1880	Change 1870-1880
1	Detroit	Wayne	45,619	79,577	101,255	116,340	46.2%
2	Grand Rapids	Kent	8,085	16,507	25,989	32,016	94.0%
3	Jackson	Jackson	5,000	14,447	13,860	16,105	11.5%
4	Kalamazoo	Kalamazoo	6,070	9,181	10,000	11,937	30.0%
5	Adrian	Lenawee	6,213	8,438	8,866	7,849	−7.0%
6	Saginaw	Saginaw	1,699	7,460	10,064	10,525	41.1%
7	Ann Arbor	Washtenaw	5,097	7,363	6,692	8,061	9.5%
8	Bay City	Bay	1,583	7,064	13,767	20,693	192.9%
9	Muskegon	Muskegon	1,450	6,002	9,000	11,262	87.6%
10	Port Huron	St. Clair	4,371	5,973	8,240	8,883	48.7%
11	Battle Creek	Calhoun	3,509	5,838	6,000	7,063	21.0%
12	Ypsilanti	Washtenaw	3,955	5,471	5,211	4,984	−8.9%
13	Flint	Genesee	2,950	5,386	4,200	8,409	56.1%
14	Lansing	Ingham	3,074	5,241	7,445	8,319	58.7%
15	Monroe	Monroe	3,892	5,086	6,000	4,930	−3.1%

=== Counties ===
The following is a list of counties in Michigan with populations of at least 30,000 based on 1870 U.S. Census data. Historic census data from 1860 and 1880 are included to reflect trends in population increases or decreases.

1870 Rank	County	Largest city	1860 Pop.	1870 Pop.	1880 Pop.	Change 1870-1880
1	Wayne	Detroit	75,547	119,068	168,444	41.5%
2	Kent	Grand Rapids	30,716	50,403	73,253	45.3%
3	Lenawee	Adrian	38,112	45,595	48,343	6.0%
4	Washtenaw	Ann Arbor	35,686	41,434	41,848	1.0%
5	Oakland	Pontiac	38,261	40,867	41,537	1.8%
6	Saginaw	Saginaw	12,693	39,097	59,095	51.1%
7	St. Clair	Port Huron	26,604	36,661	46,197	26.0%
8	Calhoun	Battle Creek	29,564	36,569	38,452	5.1%
9	Jackson	Jackson	26,671	36,047	42,031	16.6%
10	Berrien	Niles	22,378	35,104	36,785	4.8%
11	Genesee	Flint	22,498	33,900	39,220	15.7%
12	Kalamazoo	Kalamazoo	24,646	32,054	34,342	7.1%
13	Hillsdale	Hillsdale	25,675	31,684	32,723	3.3%

== Sports ==
=== Baseball ===
- 1875 Michigan Wolverines baseball season - The Wolverines compiled a 1–2 record, winning a game against the Detroit Aetnas and losing games to the Aetnas and Jackson Mutuals. William Johnson was the team captain.

== Births ==
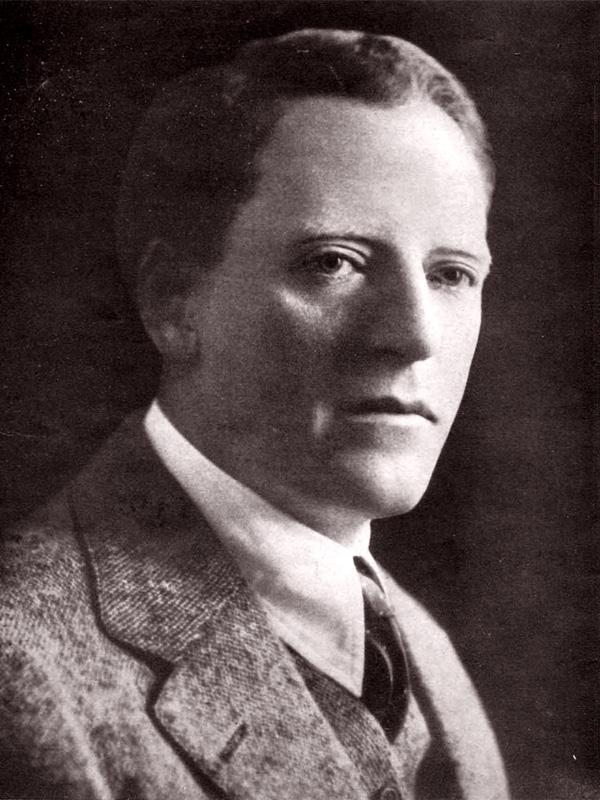
James Kirkwood Sr.

- January 31 – Horace B. Carpenter, silent movie actor, director, and screenwriter, in Grand Rapids, Michigan
- February 22 – James Kirkwood Sr., silent movie actor and director, in Grand Rapids
- December 2 – Louis C. Cramton, U.S. Representative from Michigan's 7th District (1913-1931), at Hadley Township, Michigan

== Deaths ==
- March 18 – George G. B. Yeckley, member of the Michigan House of Representatives, died in office, at 44, in Hamilton Township, Van Buren County
- May 16 – Daniel Dunakin, member of the Michigan House of Representatives (1855–1856), at age 65

== See also ==
- History of Michigan
- History of Detroit
