= 1915 in Michigan =

- Decades: 1890s; 1900s; 1910s; 1920s; 1930s
- See also: History of Michigan; Historical outline of Michigan; List of years in Michigan; 1915 in the United States

Events from the year 1915 in Michigan.

== Office holders ==
=== State office holders ===
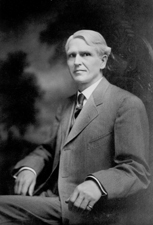
Gov. Woodbridge N. Ferris

- Governor of Michigan: Woodbridge N. Ferris (Democrat)
- Lieutenant Governor of Michigan: Luren D. Dickinson (Republican)
- Michigan Attorney General: Grant Fellows (Republican)
- Michigan Secretary of State: Coleman C. Vaughan
- Speaker of the Michigan House of Representatives: Charles W. Smith (Republican)
- Chief Justice, Michigan Supreme Court: Flavius L. Brooke

=== Mayors of major cities ===
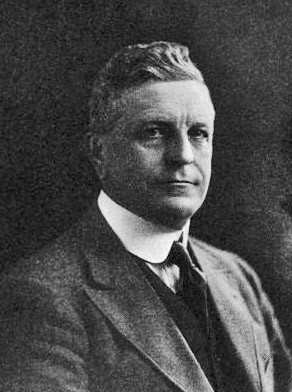
Detroit Mayor Oscar Marx

- Mayor of Detroit: Oscar Marx (Republican)
- Mayor of Grand Rapids: George E. Ellis
- Mayor of Flint: John R. MacDonald/William H. McKeighan
- Mayor of Lansing: Benjamin A. Kyes
- Mayor of Saginaw: Ard E. Richardson/Hilem F. Paddock
- Mayor of Ann Arbor: Ernst M. Wurster

=== Federal office holders ===
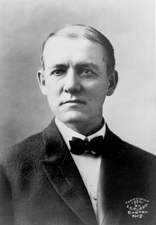
U.S. Sen. Charles E. Townsend

- U.S. Senator from Michigan: Charles E. Townsend (Republican)
- U.S. Senator from Michigan: William Alden Smith (Republican)
- House District 1: Frank Ellsworth Doremus (Democrat)
- House District 2: Samuel Beakes (Democrat)
- House District 3: John M. C. Smith (Republican)
- House District 4: Edward L. Hamilton (Republican)
- House District 5: Carl E. Mapes (Republican)
- House District 6: Samuel William Smith (Republican)/Patrick H. Kelley (Republican)
- House District 7: Louis C. Cramton (Republican)
- House District 8: Joseph W. Fordney (Republican)
- House District 9: James C. McLaughlin (Republican)
- House District 10: Roy O. Woodruff (Progressive)/George A. Loud (Republican)
- House District 11: Francis O. Lindquist (Republican)/Frank D. Scott (Republican)
- House District 12: William Josiah MacDonald (Progressive)/W. Frank James (Republican)

== Population ==
In the 1910 United States census, Michigan was recorded as having a population of 2,810,173, ranking as the ninth most populous state in the country. By 1920, Michigan's population had increased by 30.5% to 3,668,412.

=== Cities ===
The following is a list of cities in Michigan with a population of at least 10,000 based on 1910 U.S. Census data. Historic census data from 1900 and 1920 is included to reflect trends in population increases or decreases. In recent decades, all of the state's most populous cities lie in the southern half of the lower peninsula. In 1910, owing largely to an economy based on extraction of natural resources, eight of the state's most populous cities were located north of 44° latitude; in the chart below, these cities are shaded in aqua.

1910 Rank	City	County	1900 Pop.	1910 Pop.	1920 Pop.	Change 1910-20
1	Detroit	Wayne	285,704	465,766	993,678	113.3%
2	Grand Rapids	Kent	87,565	112,571	137,634	22.3%
3	Saginaw	Saginaw	42,345	50,510	61,903	22.6%
4	Bay City	Bay	27,628	45,166	47,554	5.3%
5	Kalamazoo	Kalamazoo	24,404	39,437	48,487	22.9%
6	Flint	Genesee	13,103	38,550	91,599	137.6%
7	Jackson	Jackson	25,180	31,433	48,374	53.9%
8	Lansing	Ingham	16,485	31,229	57,327	83.6%
9	Battle Creek	Calhoun	18,563	25,267	36,164	43.1%
10	Muskegon	Muskegon	20,818	24,062	36,570	52.0%
11	Port Huron	St. Clair	19,158	18,863	25,944	37.5%
12	Ann Arbor	Washtenaw	14,509	14,817	19,516	31.7%
13	Pontiac	Oakland	9,769	14,532	34,273	135.8%
14	Escanaba	Delta	9,549	13,194	13,103	−0.7%
15	Ironwood	Gogebic	9,705	12,821	15,739	22.8%
16	Alpena	Alpena	11,802	12,706	11,101	−12.6%
17	Sault Ste. Marie	Chippewa	10,538	12,615	12,096	−4.1%
18	Manistee	Manistee	14,260	12,381	9,694	−21.7%
19	Traverse City	Grand Traverse	9,407	12,115	10,925	−9.8%
20	Marquette	Marquette	10,058	11,503	12,718	10.6%
21	Adrian	Lenawee	9,654	10,763	11,878	10.4%
22	Menominee	Menominee	12,818	10,507	8,907	−15.2%
23	Holland	Ottawa	7,790	10,490	12,183	16.1%

=== Boom cities of the 1910s ===
The 1910s saw an explosion of growth in the population of small cities near Detroit. Highland Park and Hamtramck were the most extreme cases, each experiencing population increases in excess of 1,000% during the 1910s.

1910 Rank	City	County	1900 Pop.	1910 Pop.	1920 Pop.	Change 1920-30
	Highland Park	Wayne	427	4,120	46,499	1,028.6%
	Hamtramck	Wayne	--	3,559	48,615	1,266%

=== Counties ===
The following is a list of counties in Michigan with populations of at least 50,000 based on 1910 U.S. Census data. Historic census data from 1900 and 1920 are included to reflect trends in population increases or decreases.

1910 Rank	County	Largest city	1900 Pop.	1910 Pop.	1920 Pop.	Change 1910-20
1	Wayne	Detroit	348,793	531,591	1,177,645	121.5%
2	Kent	Grand Rapids	129,714	159,145	183,041	15.0%
3	Saginaw	Saginaw	81,222	89,290	100,286	12.3%
4	Houghton	Houghton	66,063	88,098	71,930	−18.4%
5	Bay	Bay City	62,378	68,238	69,548	1.9%
6	Genesee	Flint	41,804	64,555	125,668	94.7%
7	Kalamazoo	Kalamazoo	44,310	60,327	71,225	18.1%
8	Calhoun	Battle Creek	49,315	56,638	72,918	28.7%
9	Berrien	Niles	49,165	53,622	62,653	16.8%
10	Jackson	Jackson	48,222	53,426	72,539	35.8%
11	Ingham	Lansing	39,818	53,310	81,554	53.0%
12	St. Clair	Port Huron	55,228	52,341	58,009	10.8%
13	Oakland	Pontiac	44,792	49,576	90,050	81.6%
14	Lenawee	Adrian	48,406	47,907	47,767	−0.3%
15	Marquette	Marquette	41,239	46,739	45,786	−2.0%
16	Ottawa	Holland	39,667	45,301	47,660	5.2%
17	Washtenaw	Ann Arbor	47,761	44,714	49,520	10.7%
18	Muskegon	Muskegon	37,036	40,577	62,362	53.7%
19	Allegan	Holland	38,812	39,819	37,540	−5.7%

== Sports ==
=== Baseball ===
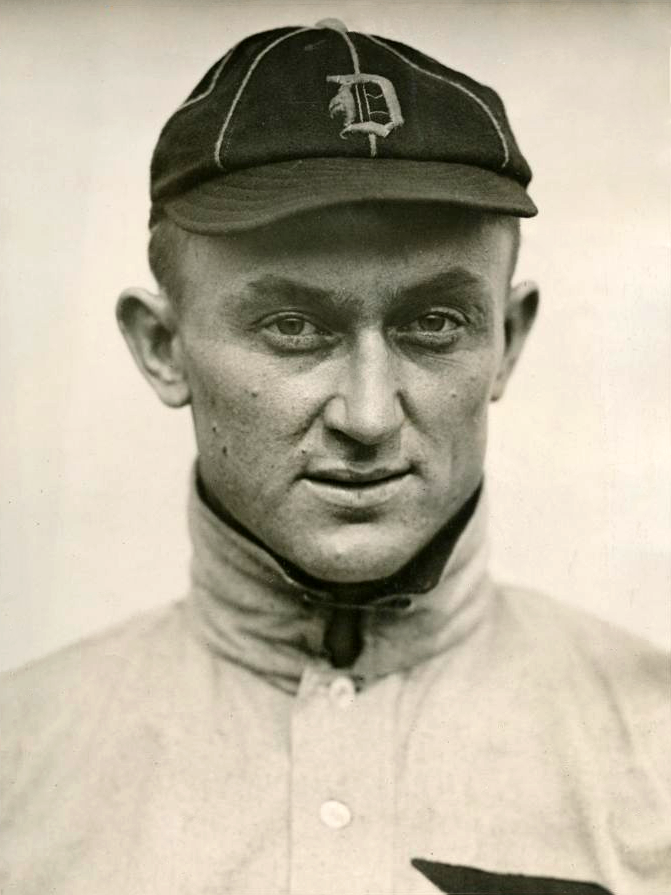
Ty Cobb

- 1915 Detroit Tigers season – The Tigers compiled a 100-54 record, the second best in club history, but finished in second place in the American League behind the Boston Red Sox. The Tigers' 1915 outfield of Ty Cobb, Sam Crawford, and Bobby Veach finished first, second, and third in the American League in both runs batted in and total bases and was selected by baseball historian Bill James as the best in major league history.
- 1915 Michigan Wolverines baseball season - Under head coach Carl Lundgren, the Wolverines compiled a 16–7–3 record. Edmund McQueen was the team captain. George Sisler played first base and pitcher for the team.

=== American football ===
- 1915 Detroit Heralds season - Under head coach Bill Marshall, the team compiled a 5–1–1 record.
- 1915 Michigan Wolverines football team – Under head coach Fielding H. Yost, the Wolverines compiled a 4–3–1 record.
- 1915 Michigan Agricultural Aggies football team –
- 1915 Western State Hilltoppers football team -
- 1915 Michigan State Normal Normalites football team –
- 1910 Detroit Titans football team –

== Births ==
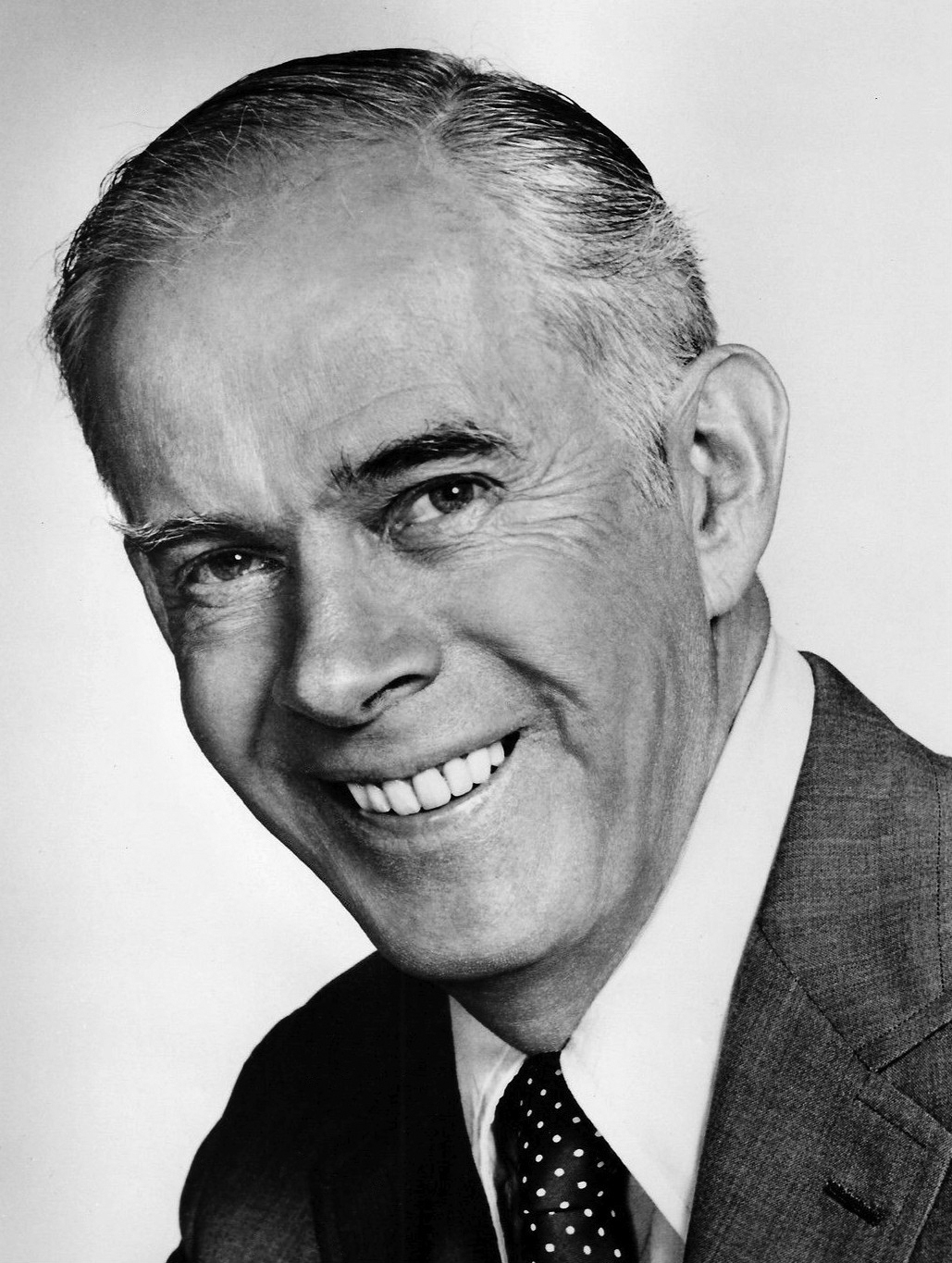
Harry Morgan

- January 11 - Lucille Farrier Stickel, wildlife toxicologist whose research on contaminants in wildlife ecosystems and on the pesticide DDT helped form the basis for Rachel Carson's Silent Spring, in Hillman, Michigan
- March 14 - Roy Kellerman, U.S. Secret Service agent assigned to John F. Kennedy when he was assassinated, in New Baltimore, Michigan
- April 10 - Harry Morgan, actor (Bill Gannon on Dragnet, Colonel Sherman T. Potter in M*A*S*H), in Detroit
- April 13 - Bob Devaney, head football coach at Wyoming (1957–1961) and Nebraska (1962–1972), and athletic director at Nebraska (1967–1993), in Saginaw, Michigan
- May 19 - Elman Service, cultural anthropologist who researched Latin American Indian ethnology, cultural evolution, and theory and method in ethnology, in Tecumseh, Michigan
- June 15 - Thomas Huckle Weller, virologist who received Nobel Prize in 1954 for showing how to cultivate poliomyelitis viruses in a test tube, in Ann Arbor, Michigan

== Deaths ==
- November 16 - Julius C. Burrows, United States Senator from Michigan (1895-1911), at age 78 in Kalamazoo

== See also ==
- History of Michigan
- History of Detroit
