= 1865 in Michigan =

- Decades: 1840s; 1850s; 1860s; 1870s; 1880s
- See also: History of Michigan; Historical outline of Michigan; List of years in Michigan; 1865 in the United States

Events from the year 1865 in Michigan.

== Office holders ==
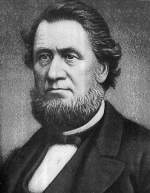
Gov. Crapo

=== State office holders ===
- Governor of Michigan: Austin Blair/Henry H. Crapo
- Lieutenant Governor of Michigan: Charles S. May/Ebenezer O. Grosvenor
- Michigan Attorney General: Albert Williams
- Michigan Secretary of State: James B. Porter
- State Land Commissioner: Cyrus Hewitt
- Speaker of the Michigan House of Representatives: Gilbert E. Read
- Chief Justice, Michigan Supreme Court: George Martin

=== Mayors of major cities ===
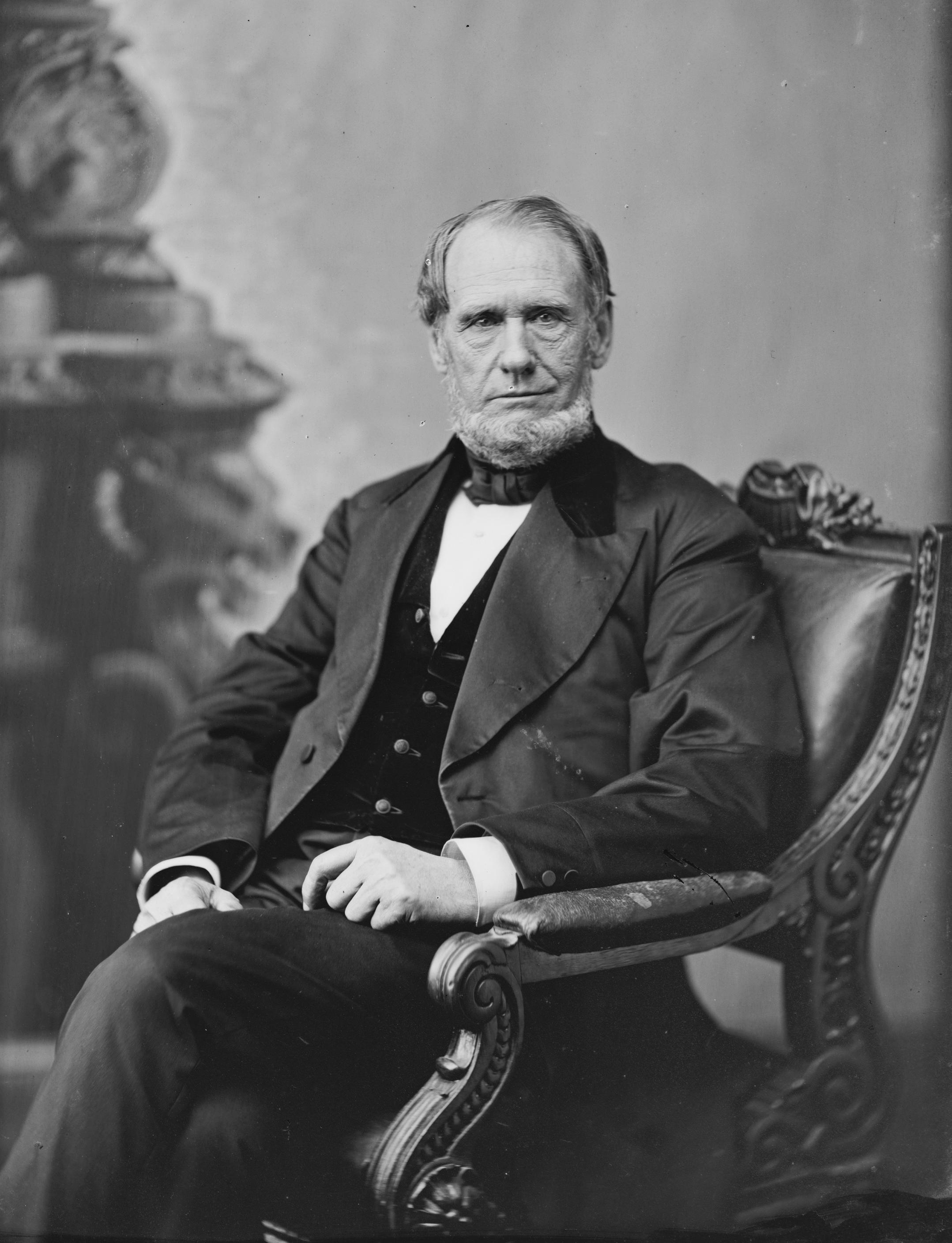
Sen. Christiancy

- Mayor of Detroit: Kirkland C. Barker
- Mayor of Grand Rapids: Wilder D. Foster
- Mayor of Flint: William Hamilton/William B. McCreery
- Mayor of Saginaw: Samuel W. Yawkey
- Mayor of Lansing, Michigan: Dr. Ira H. Bartholomew
- Mayor of Ann Arbor: Ebenezer Wells/William S. Maynard

=== Federal office holders ===
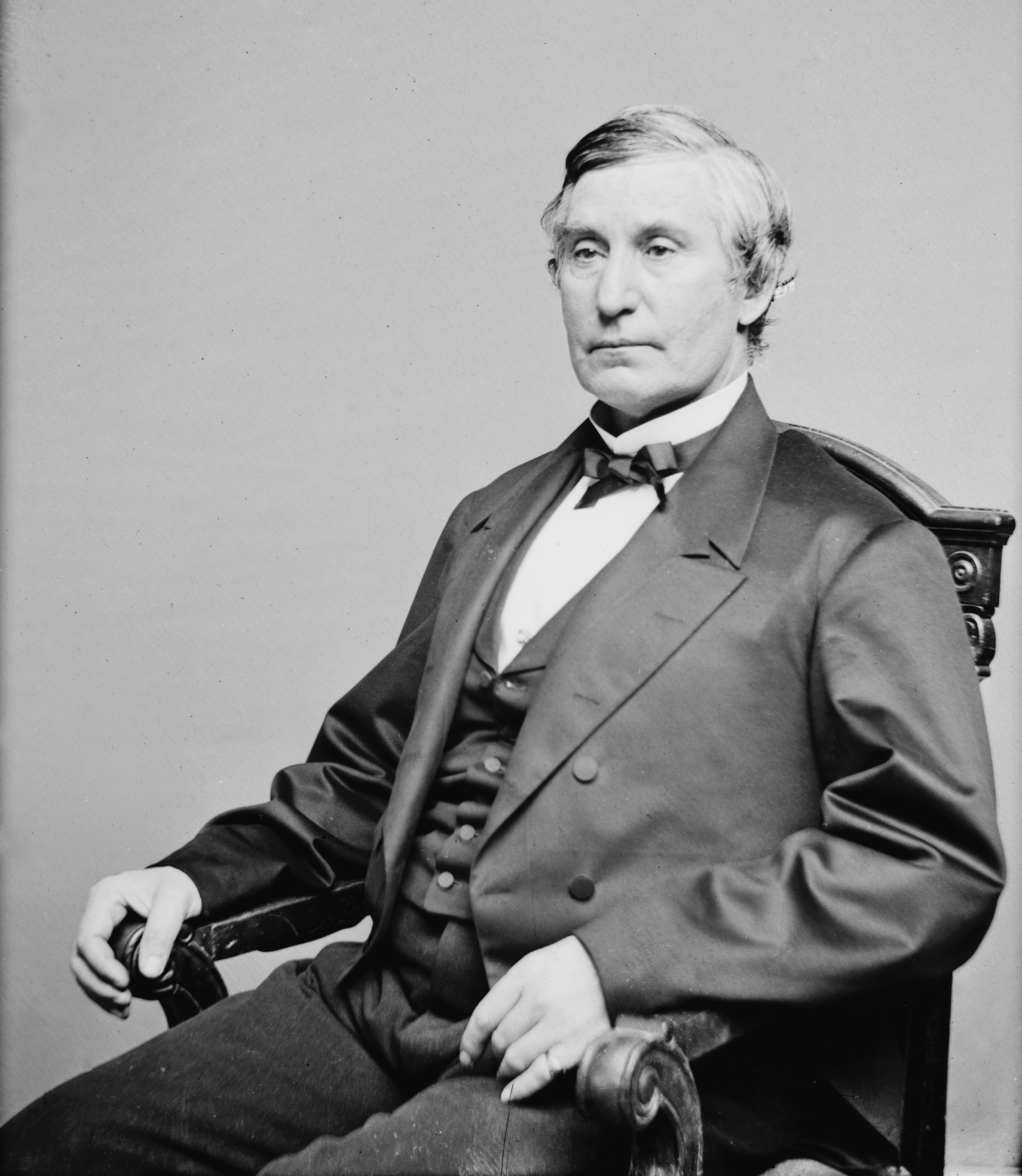
Sen. Howard

- U.S. Senator from Michigan: Zachariah Chandler (Republican)/Isaac P. Christiancy
- U.S. Senator from Michigan: Jacob M. Howard (Republican)
- House District 1: Fernando C. Beaman (Republican)
- House District 2: Charles Upson (Republican)
- House District 3: John W. Longyear (Republican)
- House District 4: Francis William Kellogg (Republican)/Thomas W. Ferry (Republican)
- House District 5: Augustus C. Baldwin (Democrat)/Rowland E. Trowbridge (Republican)
- House District 6: John F. Driggs (Republican)

== Population ==
In the 1860 United States census, Michigan was recorded as having a population of 749,113, an increase of 88.4% from the 1850 Census when the population was 397,654. By 1870, Michigan's population had increased by another 58.1% to 1,184,059.

=== Cities ===
The following is a list of cities in Michigan with a population of at least 3,000 based on 1860 U.S. Census data. Historic census data from 1850 and 1870 is included to reflect trends in population increases or decreases.

1860 Rank	City	County	1850	1860	1870	Change 1860-1870
1	Detroit	Wayne	21,019	45,619	79,577	74.4%
2	Grand Rapids	Kent	2,686	8,085	16,507	104.2%
3	Adrian	Lenawee	--	6,213	8,438	35.8%
4	Kalamazoo	Kalamazoo	2,507	6,070	9,181	51.3%
5	Ann Arbor	Washtenaw	--	5,097	7,363	44.5%
6	Jackson	Jackson	2,363	5,000	14,447	188.9%
7	Port Huron	St. Clair	--	4,371	5,973	36.7%
8	Ypsilanti	Washtenaw	--	3,955	5,471	38.3%
9	Monroe	Monroe	2,813	3,892	5,086	30.7%
10	Battle Creek	Calhoun	1,064	3,509	5,838	66.4%
11	Lansing	Ingham	1,299	3,074	5,241	70.5%

=== Counties ===
The following is a list of counties in Michigan with populations of at least 20,000 based on 1860 U.S. Census data. Historic census data from 1850 and 1870 are included to reflect trends in population increases or decreases.

1860 Rank	County	Largest city	1850 Pop.	1860 Pop.	1870 Pop.	Change 1860-1870
1	Wayne	Detroit	42,756	75,547	119,068	57.6%
2	Oakland	Pontiac	31,270	38,261	40,867	6.8%
3	Lenawee	Adrian	26,372	38,112	45,595	19.6%
4	Washtenaw	Ann Arbor	28,567	35,686	41,434	16.1%
5	Kent	Grand Rapids	12,016	30,716	50,403	64.1%
6	Calhoun	Battle Creek	19,162	29,564	36,569	23.7%
7	Jackson	Jackson	19,431	26,671	36,047	35.2%
8	St. Clair	Port Huron	10,420	26,604	36,661	37.8%
9	Hillsdale	Hillsdale	16,159	25,675	31,684	23.4%
10	Kalamazoo	Kalamazoo	13,179	24,646	32,054	30.1%
11	Genesee	Flint	12,031	22,498	33,900	50.7%
12	Berrien	Niles	11,417	22,378	35,104	56.9%

== Chronology of events ==
=== March ===
- March 12 - The Detroit Police Department was formed. The first uniformed officers began patrolling on May 15.
- March 25 - The Detroit Public Library opened on the second floor of the old Michigan State Capitol building in Detroit.

=== April ===
- April 9 - Robert E. Lee surrendered his Army of Northern Virginia, bringing an end to the American Civil War.
- April 15 - Abraham Lincoln died after being shot one day earlier.
- April 16 - At the invitation Mayor Barker, an overflow crowd of Detroit residents assembled at City Hall. Resolutions were passed, including one expressing "profound sorrow" and "horror and anguish".
- April 25 - A parade in Detroit honored Pres. Lincoln.

=== July ===
- July - The Upper Peninsula miners' strike of 1865 was put down by a naval detachment from the USS Michigan, using an improvised armored train, and later with an army detachment from Chicago.

=== August ===
- August 13 - General Ulysses S. Grant visited Detroit.

=== September ===
- September 12/13 - The Colored Men's Convention met in Detroit.

=== October ===
- October 17 - The 102nd Regiment United States Colored Troops returned to Detroit and was disbanded.

== Births ==
- March 21 - George Owen Squier, U.S. Army officer and inventor, in Dryden, Michigan
- April 13 - Grant Fellows, Michigan Attorney General (1913–1917), in Hudson Township, Lenawee County, Michigan
- June 28 - Frank Scheibeck, Major League Baseball shortstop (1887–1906), in Detroit
- July 21 - Fred M. Warner, 26th Governor of Michigan (1905–1911), in Hickling, Nottinghamshire
- November 15 - Jerome H. Remick, music publisher, in Detroit
- December 1 - Friend Richardson, Governor of California (1923–1927), in Friend's Colony, Michigan
- Date unknown - Lyster Hoxie Dewey, botanist, in Cambridge Township, Michigan

== See also ==
- History of Michigan
- History of Detroit
