= 1905 in Michigan =

- Decades: 1880s; 1890s; 1900s; 1910s; 1920s
- See also: History of Michigan; Historical outline of Michigan; List of years in Michigan; 1905 in the United States

Events from the year 1905 in Michigan.

== Office holders ==
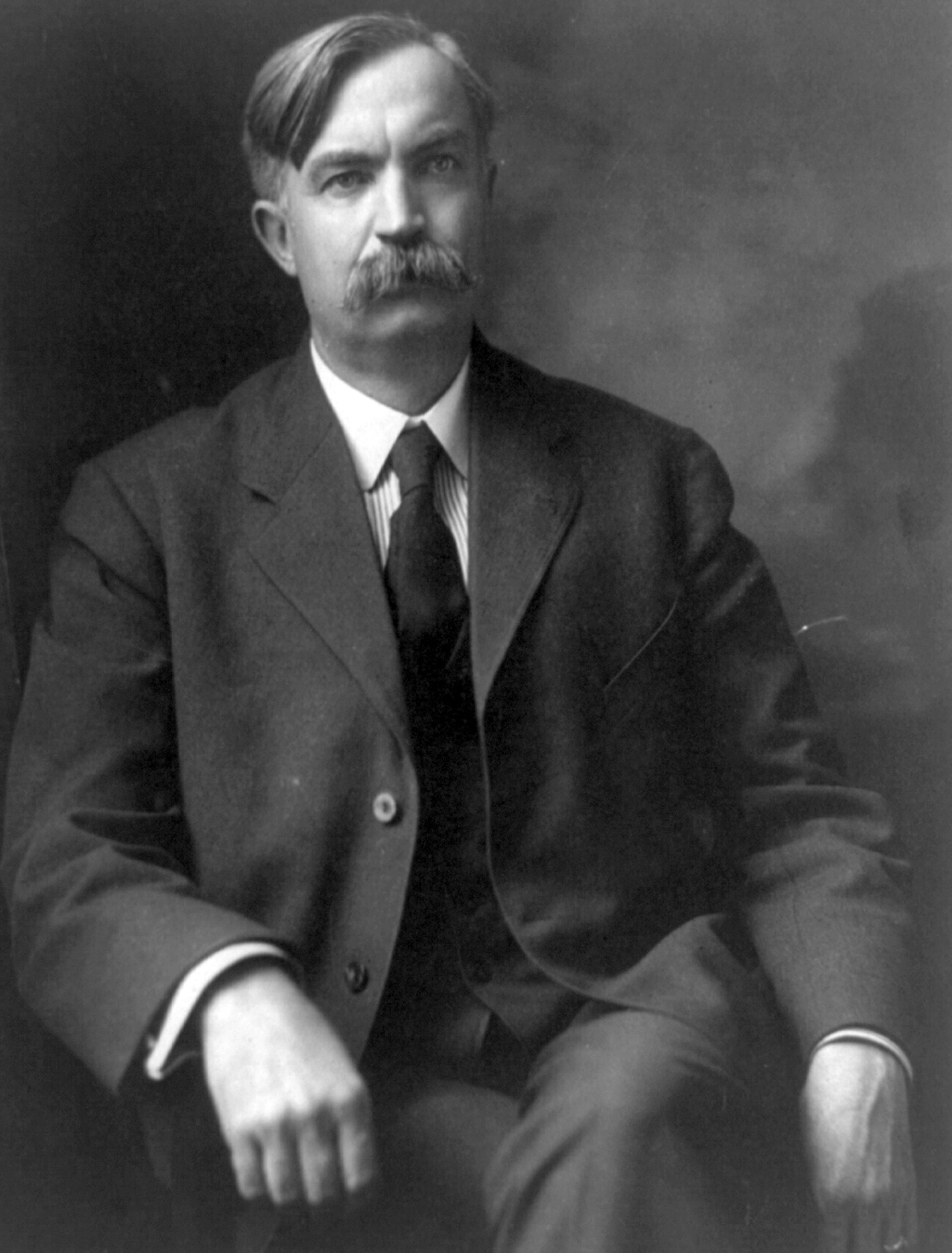
Gov. Fred M. Warner

=== State office holders ===
- Governor of Michigan: Fred M. Warner (Republican)
- Lieutenant Governor of Michigan: Alexander Maitland (Republican)
- Michigan Attorney General: John E. Bird
- Michigan Secretary of State: George A. Prescott (Republican)
- State Land Commissioner: William H. Rose (Republican)
- Speaker of the Michigan House of Representatives: Sheridan F. Master (Republican)
- Chief Justice, Michigan Supreme Court: Joseph B. Moore

=== Mayors of major cities ===
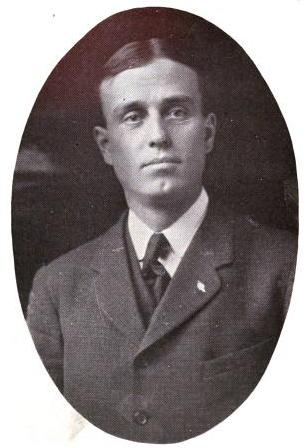
Mayor George P. Codd

- Mayor of Detroit: George P. Codd (Republican)
- Mayor of Grand Rapids: Edwin F. Sweet (Democrat)/George E. Ellis (Republican)
- Mayor of Flint: Bruce J. McDonald/David D. Aitken
- Mayor of Lansing: Benjamin A. Kyes
- Mayor of Saginaw: Hugh Lyons
- Mayor of Ann Arbor: Arthur Brown/Francis M. Hamilton

=== Federal office holders ===
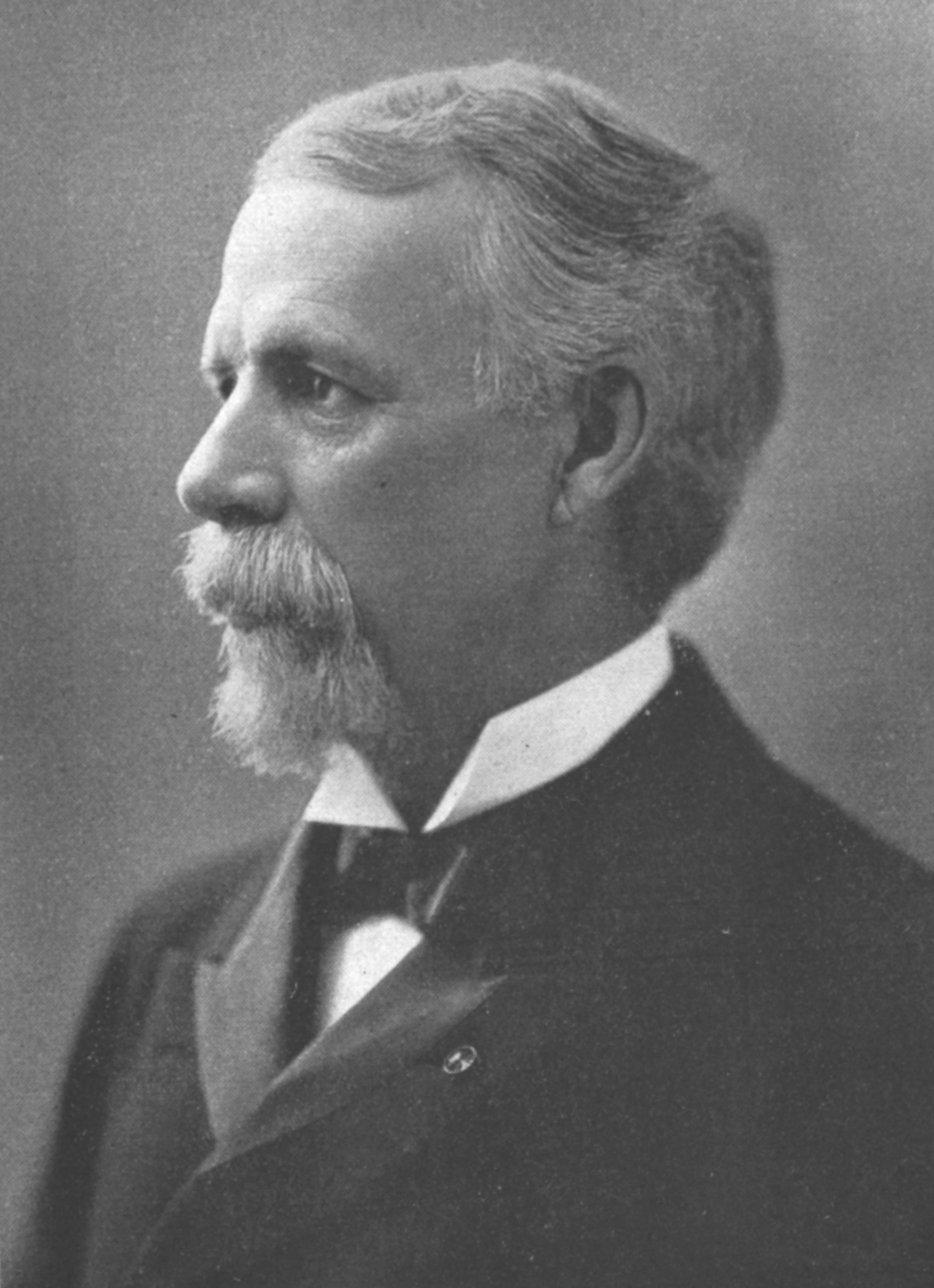
Sen. Russell A. Alger

- U.S. Senator from Michigan: Julius C. Burrows (Republican)
- U.S. Senator from Michigan: Russell A. Alger (Republican)
- House District 1: Alfred Lucking (Democrat)/Edwin Denby (Republican)
- House District 2: Charles E. Townsend (Republican)
- House District 3: Washington Gardner (Republican)
- House District 4: Edward L. Hamilton (Republican)
- House District 5: William Alden Smith (Republican)
- House District 6: Samuel William Smith (Republican)
- House District 7: Henry McMorran (Republican)
- House District 8: Joseph W. Fordney (Republican)
- House District 9: Roswell P. Bishop (Republican)
- House District 10: George A. Loud (Republican)
- House District 11: Archibald B. Darragh (Republican)
- House District 12: H. Olin Young (Republican)

== Population ==
In the 1900 United States census, Michigan was recorded as having a population of 2,420,982, ranking as the ninth most populous state in the country. By 1910, Michigan's population had increased by 16.1% to 2,810,173 .

=== Cities ===
The following is a list of cities in Michigan with a population of at least 10,000 based on 1900 U.S. census data. Historic census data from 1890 and 1910 is included to reflect trends in population increases or decreases. In recent decades, all of the state's most populous cities lie in the southern half of the lower peninsula. In 1900, owing largely to an economy based on extraction of natural resources, five of the state's largest cities were located north of 44° latitude; in the chart below, these cities are shaded in aqua.

| 1900 Rank | City | County | 1890 Pop. | 1900 Pop. | 1910 Pop. | Change 1900-10 |
|---|---|---|---|---|---|---|
| 1 | Detroit | Wayne | 205,876 | 285,704 | 465,766 | 63.0% |
| 2 | Grand Rapids | Kent | 60,278 | 87,565 | 112,571 | 28.6% |
| 3 | Saginaw | Saginaw | 46,322 | 42,345 | 50,510 | 19.3% |
| 4 | Bay City | Bay | 27,839 | 27,628 | 45,166 | 63.5% |
| 5 | Jackson | Jackson | 20,798 | 25,180 | 31,433 | 24.8% |
| 6 | Kalamazoo | Kalamazoo | 17,853 | 24,404 | 39,437 | 61.6% |
| 7 | Muskegon | Muskegon | 22,702 | 20,818 | 24,062 | 15.6% |
| 8 | Port Huron | St. Clair | 13,543 | 19,158 | 18,863 | −1.5% |
| 9 | Battle Creek | Calhoun | 13,197 | 18,563 | 25,267 | 36.1% |
| 10 | Lansing | Ingham | 13,102 | 16,485 | 31,229 | 89.4% |
| 11 | Ann Arbor | Washtenaw | 9,431 | 14,509 | 14,817 | 2.1% |
| 12 | Manistee | Manistee | 12,812 | 14,260 | 12,381 | −13.2% |
| 13 | Flint | Genesee | 9,803 | 13,103 | 38,550 | 194.2% |
| 14 | Menominee | Menominee | 10,630 | 12,818 | 10,507 | −18.0% |
| 15 | Alpena | Alpena | 6,153 | 11,283 | 11,802 | 4.6% |
| 16 | Sault Ste. Marie | Chippewa | 5,760 | 10,538 | 12,615 | 19.7% |
| 17 | Marquette | Marquette | 9,098 | 10,058 | 11,503 | 14.4% |

=== Counties ===
The following is a list of counties in Michigan with populations of at least 40,000 based on 1900 U.S. census data. Historic census data from 1890 and 1910 are included to reflect trends in population increases or decreases.

| 1900 Rank | County | Largest city | 1890 Pop. | 1900 Pop. | 1910 Pop. | Change 1900-10 |
|---|---|---|---|---|---|---|
| 1 | Wayne | Detroit | 257,114 | 348,793 | 531,591 | 52.4% |
| 2 | Kent | Grand Rapids | 109,922 | 129,714 | 159,145 | 22.7% |
| 3 | Saginaw | Saginaw | 82,273 | 81,222 | 89,290 | 9.9% |
| 4 | Houghton | Houghton | 35,389 | 66,063 | 88,098 | 33.4% |
| 5 | Bay | Bay City | 56,412 | 62,378 | 68,238 | 9.4% |
| 6 | St. Clair | Port Huron | 52,105 | 55,228 | 52,341 | −5.2% |
| 7 | Calhoun | Battle Creek | 43,501 | 49,315 | 56,638 | 14.8% |
| 8 | Berrien | Niles | 41,285 | 49,165 | 53,622 | 9.1% |
| 9 | Lenawee | Adrian | 48,448 | 48,406 | 47,907 | −1.0% |
| 10 | Jackson | Jackson | 45,031 | 48,222 | 53,426 | 10.8% |
| 11 | Washtenaw | Ann Arbor | 42,210 | 47,761 | 44,714 | −6.4% |
| 12 | Oakland | Pontiac | 41,245 | 44,792 | 49,576 | 10.7% |
| 13 | Kalamazoo | Kalamazoo | 39,273 | 44,310 | 60,327 | 36.1% |
| 14 | Genesee | Flint | 39,430 | 41,804 | 64,555 | 54.4% |
| 15 | Marquette | Marquette | 39,521 | 41,239 | 46,739 | 13.3% |
| 16 | Ottawa | Holland | 35,358 | 39,667 | 45,301 | 14.2% |

== Sports ==
=== Baseball ===
- 1905 Detroit Tigers season – The Tigers compiled a 79-74 record and finished in third place in the American League. The team's statistical leaders included Sam Crawford with 75 RBIs and a .297 batting average and Ed Killian with a 23-14 record and a 2.27 earned run average.
- 1905 Michigan Wolverines baseball season - Under head coach Lew "Sport" McAllister, the Wolverines compiled a 16–3 record and won the Western Conference championship. Charles Campbell was the team captain.

=== American football ===
- 1905 Michigan Wolverines football team – Under head coach was Fielding H. Yost, the Wolverines compiled a 12–1, outscored its opponents by a combined total of 495 to 2, and lost the final game of the season by a score of 2–0 against the University of Chicago.
- 1905 Michigan Agricultural Aggies football team –
- 1905 Michigan State Normal Normalites football team -

== Births ==
- February 6 - Merze Tate, the first African-American graduate of Western Michigan Teachers College, first African-American woman to attend the University of Oxford, and first African-American woman to earn a Ph.D. in government and international relations from Harvard University, in Blanchard, Michigan
- May 16 - Ken Doherty, decathlon champion, college track and field coach, author and longtime director of the Penn Relays, in Detroit
- June 24 - Fred Alderman, sprint runner who won a gold medal in 4 × 400 m relay at the 1928 Summer Olympics, in East Lansing, Michigan
- July 11 - Neil Staebler, Michigan Democratic Party leader, in Ann Arbor, Michigan
- September 10 - William Clemens, film director (On Dress Parade, The Case of the Velvet Claws The Case of the Stuttering Bishop), in Saginaw, Michigan
- November 18 - William S. Carlson, President of the University of Delaware, University of Vermont, State University of New York, and University of Toledo, in Ironwood, Michigan
- December 1 - Charles Van Riper, internationally known pioneer in the development of speech pathology and treatment of stuttering, in Champion Township, Michigan

== Deaths ==
- January 17 - John W. Jochim, Michigan Secretary of State (1893-1894), at age 59 in Ishpeming
- March 4 - William B. Williams, represented Michigan in Congress (1873-1877), at age 78 in Allegan, Michigan
- March 18 - Cyrus G. Luce, Governor of Michigan (1887-1891), at age 80 in Coldwater, Michigan
- June 30 - George Washington Peck, Michigan Secretary of State (1848-1850) and Congressman from Michigan 4th District (1855-1857), at age 87 in Saginaw, Michigan

== See also ==
- History of Michigan
- History of Detroit
