= 1895 in Michigan =

- Decades: 1870s; 1880s; 1890s; 1900s; 1910s
- See also: History of Michigan; Historical outline of Michigan; List of years in Michigan; 1895 in the United States

Events from the year 1895 in Michigan.

== Office holders ==
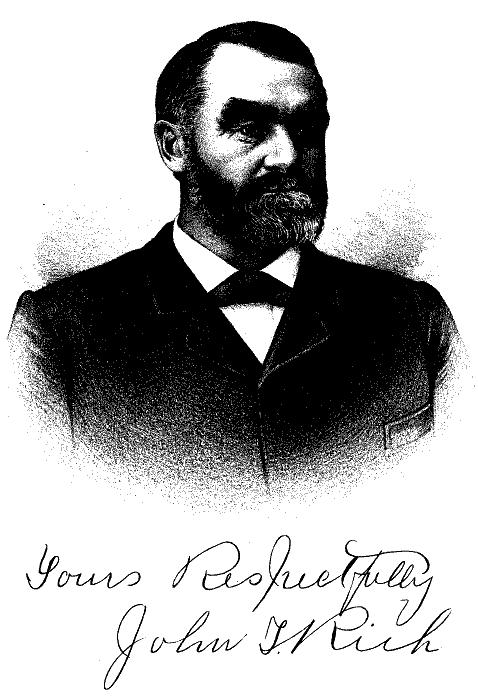
Gov. John T. Rich

=== State office holders ===
- Governor of Michigan: John T. Rich (Republican)
- Lieutenant Governor of Michigan: J. Wight Giddings/Alfred Milnes/Joseph R. McLaughlin
- Michigan Attorney General: Adolphus A. Ellis/Fred A. Maynard
- Michigan Secretary of State: Washington Gardner (Republican)
- State Land Commissioner: William A. French (Republican)
- Speaker of the Michigan House of Representatives: William D. Gordon
- Chief Justice, Michigan Supreme Court: John W. McGrath/Charles D. Long

=== Mayors of major cities ===
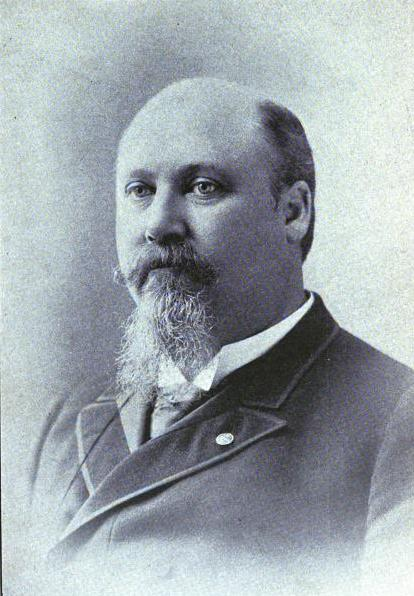
Mayor Hazen S. Pingree

- Mayor of Detroit: Hazen S. Pingree (Republican)
- Mayor of Grand Rapids: Ernest B. Fisher/Charles D. Stebbins
- Mayor of Flint: Guy W. Selby
- Mayor of Lansing:
- Mayor of Saginaw: William B. Mershon/William B. Baum
- Mayor of Ann Arbor: Ernst M. Wurster

=== Federal office holders ===
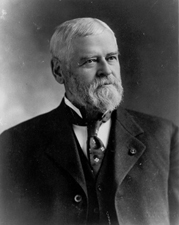
Sen. Julius Burrows

- U.S. Senator from Michigan: Julius C. Burrows (Republican)
- U.S. Senator from Michigan: James McMillan (Republican)
- House District 1: Levi T. Griffin (Democrat)/John Blaisdell Corliss (Republican)
- House District 2: James S. Gorman (Democrat)/George Spalding (Republican)
- House District 3: Alfred Milnes (Republican)
- House District 4: Henry F. Thomas (Republican)
- House District 5: George F. Richardson (Democrat)/William Alden Smith (Republican)
- House District 6: David D. Aitken (Republican)
- House District 7: Justin Rice Whiting (Democrat)/Horace G. Snover (Republican)
- House District 8: William S. Linton (Republican)
- House District 9: John W. Moon (Republican)/Roswell P. Bishop (Republican)
- House District 10: Thomas A. E. Weadock (Democrat)/Rousseau Owen Crump (Republican)
- House District 11: John Avery (Republican)
- House District 12: Samuel M. Stephenson (Republican)

== Population ==
In the 1890 United States census, Michigan was recorded as having a population of 2,093,890, ranking as the ninth most populous state in the country. By 1900, Michigan's population had increased by 15.6% to 2,420,982.

=== Cities ===
The following is a list of cities in Michigan with a population of at least 7,500 based on 1890 U.S. Census data. Historic census data from 1880 and 1900 is included to reflect trends in population increases or decreases. In recent decades, all of the state's most populous cities lie in the southern half of the lower peninsula. In 1890, owing largely to an economy based on extraction of natural resources, six of the state's largest cities were located north of 44° latitude; in the chart below, these cities are shaded in aqua.

1890 Rank	City	County	1880 Pop.	1890 Pop.	1900 Pop.	Change 1890-1900
1	Detroit	Wayne	116,340	205,876	285,704	38.8%
2	Grand Rapids	Kent	32,016	60,278	87,565	45.3%
3	Saginaw	Saginaw	10,525	46,322	42,345	−8.6%
4	Bay City	Bay	20,693	27,839	27,628	−0.8%
5	Muskegon	Muskegon	11,262	22,702	20,818	−8.3%
6	Jackson	Jackson	16,105	20,798	25,180	21.1%
7	Kalamazoo	Kalamazoo	11,937	17,853	24,404	36.7%
8	Port Huron	St. Clair	8,883	13,543	19,158	41.5%
9	Battle Creek	Calhoun	7,063	13,197	18,563	40.7%
10	Lansing	Ingham	8,319	13,102	16,485	25.8%
11	Manistee	Manistee	6,930	12,812	14,260	11.3%
12	Alpena	Alpena	6,153	11,283	11,802	4.6%
13	Menominee	Menominee	3,288	10,630	12,818	20.6%
14	Flint	Genesee	8,409	9,803	13,103	33.7%
15	Ann Arbor	Washtenaw	8,061	9,431	14,509	53.8%
16	Marquette	Marquette	4,690	9,098	10,058	10.6%
17	Adrian	Lenawee	7,849	8,756	9,654	10.3%
18	Iron Mountain	Dickinson	--	8,599	9,242	7.5%
19	Ironwood	Gogebic	--	7,745	9,705	25.3%

=== Counties ===
The following is a list of counties in Michigan with populations of at least 35,000 based on 1890 U.S. Census data. Historic census data from 1880 and 1900 are included to reflect trends in population increases or decreases.

1890 Rank	County	Largest city	1880 Pop.	1890 Pop.	1900 Pop.	Change 1890-1900
1	Wayne	Detroit	168,444	257,114	348,793	35.7%
2	Kent	Grand Rapids	73,253	109,922	129,714	18.0%
3	Saginaw	Saginaw	59,095	82,273	81,222	−1.3%
4	Bay	Bay City	38,081	56,412	62,378	10.6%
5	St. Clair	Port Huron	46,197	52,105	55,228	6.0%
6	Lenawee	Adrian	48,343	48,448	48,406	−0.1%
7	Jackson	Jackson	42,031	45,031	48,222	7.1%
8	Calhoun	Battle Creek	38,452	43,501	49,315	13.4%
9	Washtenaw	Ann Arbor	41,848	42,210	47,761	13.2%
10	Berrien	Niles	36,785	41,285	49,165	19.1%
11	Oakland	Pontiac	41,537	41,245	44,792	8.6%
12	Muskegon	Muskegon	26,586	40,013	37,036	−7.4%
13	Marquette	Marquette	25,394	39,521	41,239	4.3%
14	Genesee	Flint	39,220	39,430	41,804	6.0%
15	Kalamazoo	Kalamazoo	34,342	39,273	44,310	12.8%
16	Allegan	Holland	37,815	38,961	38,812	−0.4%
17	Ingham	Lansing	33,676	37,666	39,818	5.7%
18	Houghton	Houghton	22,473	35,389	66,063	86.7%

== Sports ==
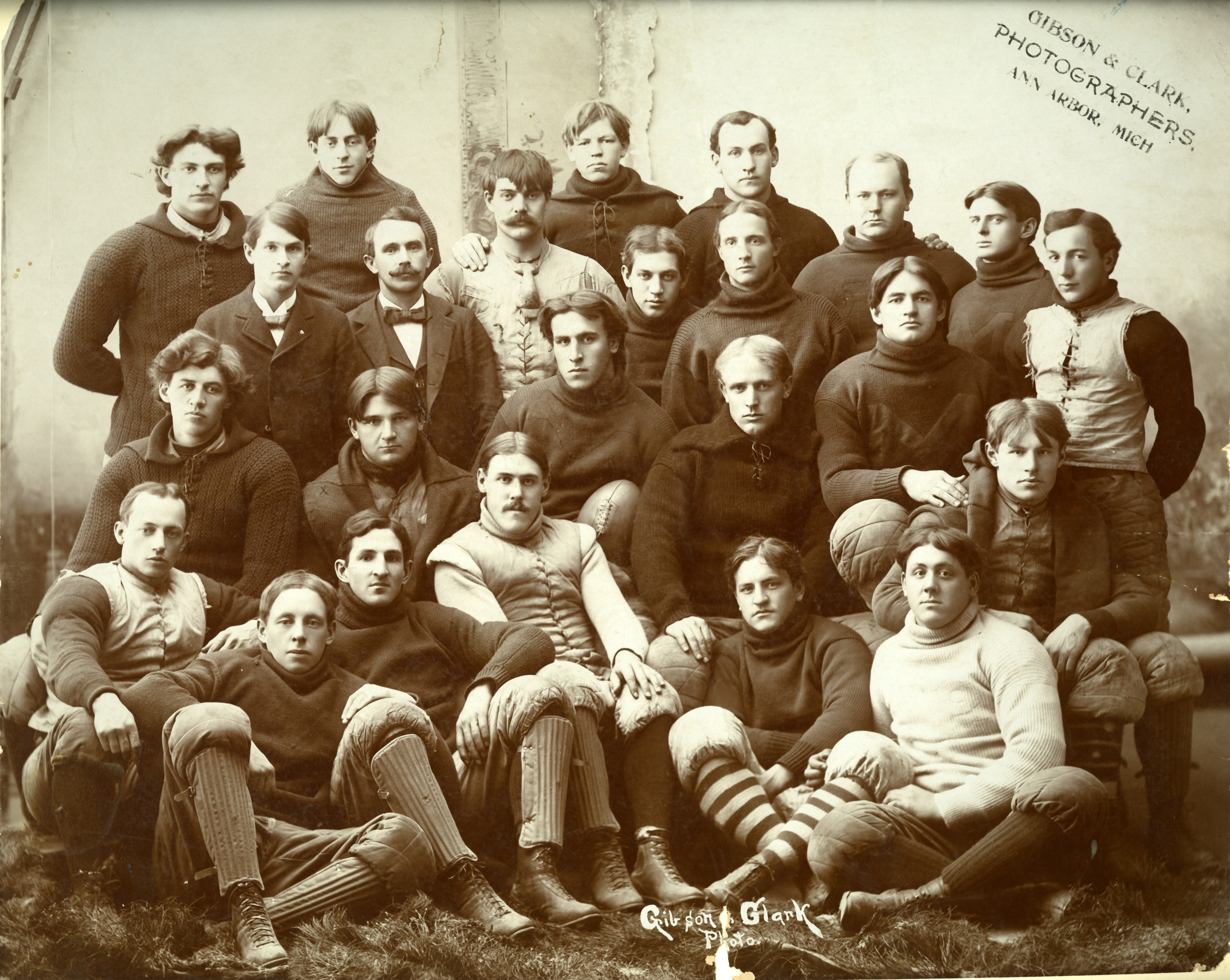
1895 Michigan football team

=== Baseball ===
- 1895 Detroit Tigers season – The Detroit baseball team, known for the first time in 1895 as the Tigers, competed in the Western League. The Tigers finished in sixth place with a 57–67 record. The team's statistical leaders included Sam Dungan with a .424 batting average, Al McCauley with 15 home runs, Count Campau with 44 stolen bases, and Robert Gayle with 22 pitching wins. George A. Van Derbeck was the team's owner and manager.
- 1895 Grand Rapids Gold Bugs season – The Grand Rapids baseball team, known as the Gold Bugs, also competed in the Western League during the 1895 season. The Gold Bugs finished in last place with a 38–84 record.
- 1895 Michigan Wolverines baseball season – The Wolverines compiled a 19–3–1 record. Edmund Shields was the team captain.

=== American football ===
- 1895 Michigan Wolverines football team – The Wolverines compiled an 8–1 record, won seven of their games by shutouts, and outscored their opponents by a combined score of 266 to 14.
- 1895 Michigan State Normal Normalites football team – Under head coach Marcus Cutler, the Normalites compiled a record of 3–3, and outscored by their opponents by a combined total of 119 to 54.

== Chronology of events ==
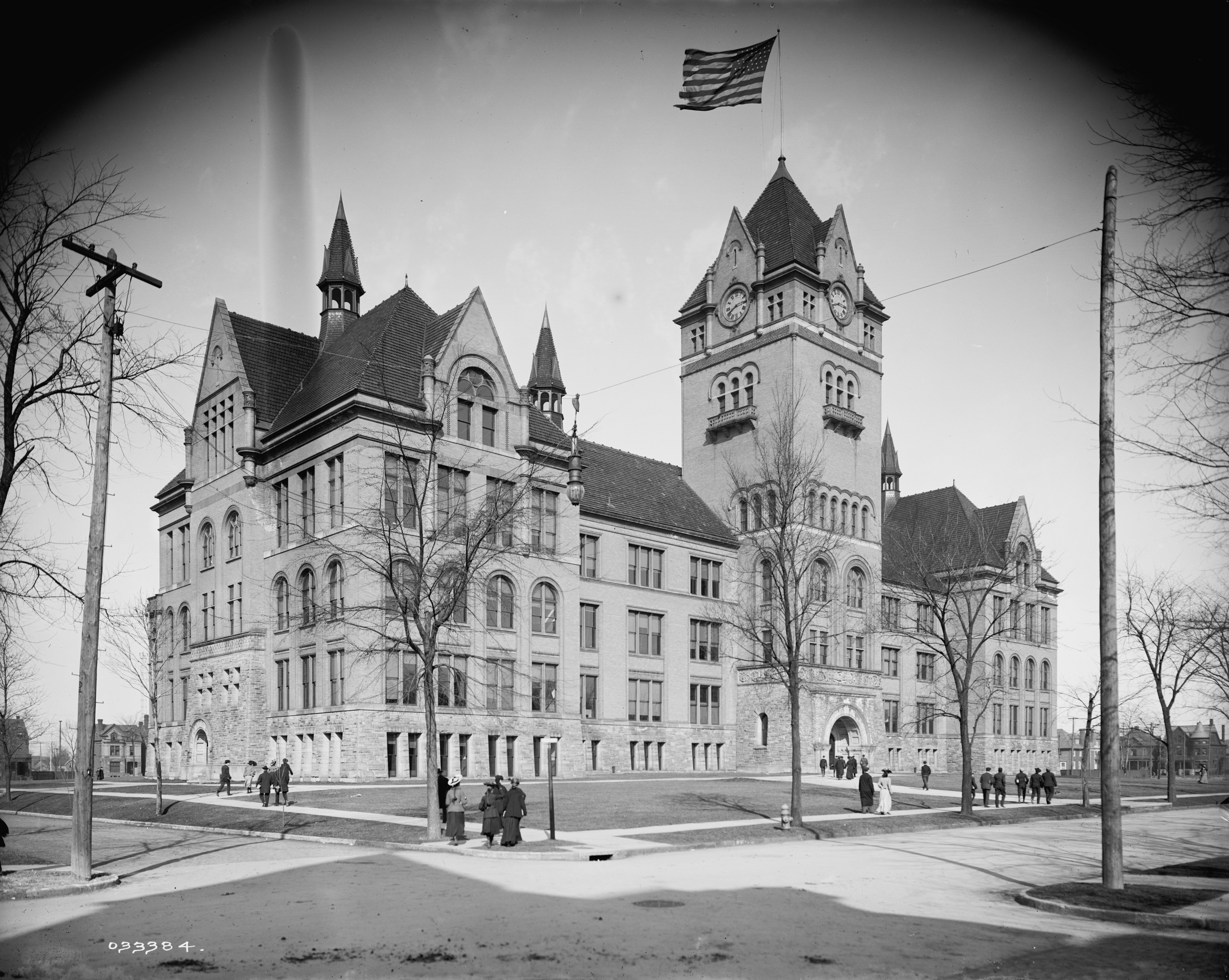
Detroit Central High School

=== January ===
- January 1 – John T. Rich was sworn in as Governor of Michigan in a ceremony at Lansing.
- January 23 – Both houses of the Michigan Legislature met in joint session for an election to fill Michigan's seats in the U.S. Senate. James McMillan was unanimously reelected a full term. Julius C. Burrows was elected for a term of four years.
- January 24 – Wreckage from the steamer Chicora was found in Lake Michigan from Benton Harbor to South Haven. All 26 persons aboard the ship were lost in a winter storm, and wreckage continued to drift ashore in the months that followed.
- January 26 – Contingents supporting and opposing Detroit Mayor Pingree clashed at the Detroit Auditorium over the Thompson health bill and a proposal in Lansing to strip the Mayor of the power to appoint a health commissioner. The Detroit Free Press called the clash of the two factions "a spectacle never before witnessed in this city or state."

=== February ===
- February 2 – Dr. Horace Eliot Pope was murdered in Detroit, his skull shattered to pieces by blows from a hatchet wielded by William Brusseau, a barber. Brusseau claimed he was defending himself and Pope's wife from an attack by Pope. The police alleged that the murder was motivated by life insurance on Pope. Brusseau then changed his story and claimed that Mrs. Pope had murdered her husband after weeks of planning. On June 4, the wife, Nellie Pope, was convicted of first degree murder and sentenced to life in prison.
- February 13 – Sen. McMillan proposed that Fort Mackinac, which had been decommissioned, be transferred to the State of Michigan for use as a park. McMillan's plan was approved, and Mackinac Island State Park became the first state park in Michigan.

=== April ===
- April 16 – The Detroit Free Press referred to the Detroit baseball club as the "Detroit Tigers" in the first use of the nickname for the club.

=== May ===
- May 1 – The Detroit baseball club opened its season with an 11–6 victory over Toledo. The game, played on a Wednesday afternoon, attracted a crowd of 6,267. The game was preceded by a parade led by Mayor Pingree through the streets of Detroit that was viewed by "tens of thousands." In a pregame ceremony marking the opening of the season, Western League President Ban Johnson presented Mayor Pingree with a ball. Former Detroit catcher Charlie Bennett, crippled in a train accident on e year earlier, was presented to a loud ovation, and Pingree threw the first pitch to him.
- May 8 – Woman protested at the State Capitol in advance of a vote on a bill granting women the right to vote. The bill narrowly failed to receiver the required super majority.
- May 13 – The cornerstone was laid for Detroit Central High School (now known as Old Main on Wayne State's campus. Mayor Pingree and 1,500 high school student attended the ceremony.
- May 19 – The United States Geological Survey's annual report on the world's iron ore resources showed that Michigan remained the country's leading producer with 4.4 million tons produced in 1894. Michigan had been the country's leading producer of iron ore for six consecutive years.
- May 31 – The steamer Norman, of the Menominee line, sunk with the loss of life of three crew members after it was struck by a Canadian boat Jack in heavy fog off Middle island in Lake Huron near Alpena.

=== June ===
- June 5 – Oscar C. Fischer, age 28 of Detroit's Fischer Brothers firm, was arrested after he shot and killed Hugh McAfee, a constable of Springwells Township, after a dispute two days earlier at Frank Hall's saloon. Fischer claimed he acted in self defense after McAfee attacked him.
- June 9 – A fire in Kalamazoo destroyed one of that city's most important business blocks, causing $300,000 in damage. The fire started at Dewing & Sons lumber yard, where two young men were suspected of starting the blaze. The fire was blown west along Burdick Street and north to a warehouse by the wind along Kalamazoo fire department was assisted by a unit from Battle Creek. There were no fatalities.
- June 12 – A contest for control of Michigan's Republican Party, between factions loyal to Detroit Mayor Hazen S. Pingree and Joseph M. Weiss ended in victory for the Pingree faction. Frank A. Rasch was chosen as the new party chairman, replacing Weiss.

=== November ===
- November – A. Baushke & Bro. announced plans to build a factory in Benton Harbor, Michigan, to build their horseless carriages under the name Benton Harbor Motor Carriage Company. The Baushke automobile predated the earliest automobile of Henry Ford and is "believed to be the first motorized vehicle built completely from scratch."

== Births ==
- February 13 - Helen MacKellar, actress, in Detroit
- February 18 – George Gipp, All-American football player for Notre Dame who was the subject of Knute Rockne's famous "Win just one for the Gipper" speech, in Laurium, Michigan
- March 13 - Roy H. Warner, one of 10 recipients of the Airmail Flyers' Medal of Honor, at Vulcan
- March 29 - Carmen L. Browne, author and illustrator of children's books, in Calumet
- April 15 - Kathleen Kirkham, actress, in Menominee
- April 19 - Harry Kelly, Governor of Michigan (1943-47), in Illinois
- April 23 - Ty Krentler, fullback, in Detroit
- May 1 - Leo Sowerby, music composer, in Grand Rapids
- June 9 - Archie Weston, Michigan quarterback 1917, in Alpena
- July 3 - Clarence J. McLeod, US Congressman (1920-1941), in Detroit
- August 12 - Alice Acheson, painter and printmaker, in Charlevoix
- September 13 - Ruth McDevitt, actress, in Coldwater
- December 13 - Ernest Watson, football player and coach, in Pontiac

== Deaths ==
- March 5 – Charles Lanman, author of "The History of Michigan" and "Michigan Red Book", government official, artist, librarian, and explorer, at age 81 in Washington, D.C.
- March 20 – Philip St. George Cooke, U.S. Army cavalry officer who served as a Union general in the American Civil War, noted for his authorship of an Army cavalry manual, and sometimes called the "Father of the U.S. Cavalry", at age 85 in Detroit
- March 24 – James Battle, fire chief in Detroit for 35 years and namesake of the James Battle, in Detroit
- April 9 – Cyrus Lovell, speaker of the Michigan House of Representatives (1855–1856), at age 90
- May 12 – Theodore H. Hinchman, a leading Detroit businessman, at age 78 in Detroit
- May 19 – William Adair, a Detroit resident since 1834, state senator and nursery operator, at age 80 in Detroit

== See also ==
- History of Michigan
- History of Detroit
