= George G. B. Yeckley =

American politician

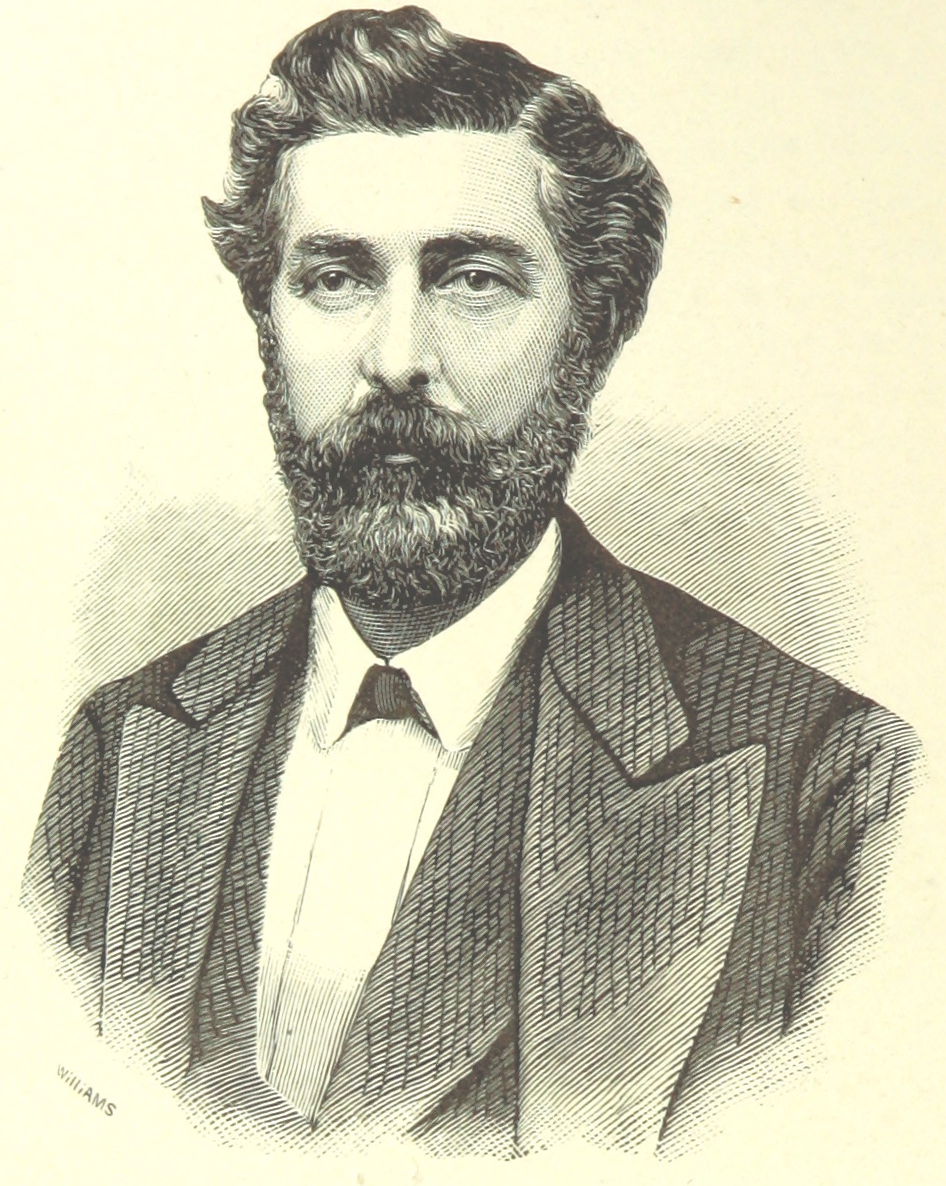

Member of the Michigan House of Representatives from the Van Buren County 2nd district
- In office January 6, 1875 – March 18, 1875
- Preceded by: Emery H. Simpson
- Succeeded by: William Thomas

Personal details
- Born: February 13, 1831 Gorham, New York
- Died: March 18, 1875 (aged 44) Hamilton Township, Van Buren County, Michigan
- Party: Republican

George Gordon Byron Yeckley (February 13, 1831 – March 18, 1875) was a Michigan politician.

== Early life and education ==
George was born on February 13, 1831, in Gorham, New York, to parents Adam and Gertrude Yeckley. George received a public school education. In 1853, George moved to Ypsilanti, Michigan. In 1860, George moved to Hamilton in Van Buren County, Michigan.

== Career ==
Yeckley was a farmer, who had maintained and improved a farm in Michigan. Yeckley served as supervisor of Hamilton from 1867 to 1873. On November 3, 1874, Yeckley was elected to the Michigan House of Representatives, where he represented the Van Buren County 2nd district from January 6, 1875, until his death.

== Personal life ==
Yeckley married Eliza Reed. Together they had six children.

== Death ==
Yeckley died on March 18, 1875. He was interred at Hamilton Cemetery in Decatur, Michigan.
