= History of Michigan =

The Great Seal of the State of Michigan

The history of human activity in Michigan, a U.S. state in the Great Lakes, began with settlement of the western Great Lakes region by Paleo-Indians perhaps as early as 11,000 BCE One early technology they developed was the use of native copper, which they would fashion into tools and other implements with hammers. The first Europeans to arrive in Michigan were the French. Explorer Étienne Brûlé traveled through Michigan in 1618 searching for a route to China. Soon the French laid claim to the land and began to trade with the local natives for furs. Men called "voyageurs" would travel the rivers by canoe trading various goods for furs that would bring a high price back in Europe.

The first French explorer of Michigan, Étienne Brûlé, began in about 1620. The area was part of French Canada from 1668 to 1763. In 1701, the French officer Antoine de la Mothe Cadillac, along with fifty-one additional French-Canadians, founded a settlement called Fort Pontchartrain du Détroit, now the city of Detroit. When New France was defeated in the French and Indian War, it ceded the region to Britain in 1763. After the British were defeated in the American Revolutionary War, the Treaty of Paris (1783) expanded the United States' boundaries to include nearly all land east of the Mississippi River and south of Canada. Michigan was then part of the "Old Northwest". From 1787 to 1800, it was part of the Northwest Territory. In 1800, the Indiana Territory was created, and most of the current state Michigan lay within it, with only the easternmost parts of the state remaining in the Northwest Territory. In 1802, when Ohio was admitted to the Union, the whole of Michigan was attached to the Territory of Indiana, and so remained until 1805, when the Territory of Michigan was established.

The opening of the Erie Canal in 1825 connected the Great Lakes with the Hudson River and New York City, and brought large numbers of people to Michigan and provided an inexpensive way to ship crops to market. In 1835 the people approved the Constitution of 1835, thereby forming a state government, although Congressional recognition was delayed pending resolution of a boundary dispute with Ohio known as the Toledo War. Congress awarded the "Toledo Strip" to Ohio. Michigan received the western part of the Upper Peninsula as a concession and formally entered the Union as the twenty-sixth state on January 26, 1837.

When iron and copper were discovered in the Upper Peninsula, impetus was created for the construction of the Soo Locks, completed in 1855. Along with mining, agriculture and logging became important industries. Ransom E. Olds founded Oldsmobile in Lansing in 1897, and in 1899 Henry Ford built his first automobile factory in Detroit. General Motors was founded in Flint in 1908. Automobile assembly and associated manufacturing soon dominated Detroit, and the economy of Michigan.

The Great Depression of the 1930s affected Michigan more severely than many other places because of its industrial base. However, the state recovered in the post World War II years. The Mackinac Bridge connecting the Upper and Lower Peninsulas was completed and opened in 1957. By the 1960s, racial tensions produced unrest through the nation, and Detroit experienced a dramatic instance with the 12th Street Riot in 1967. By the 1980s, the state saw a decline in automobile sales and unemployment climbed. Michigan continues to diversify its economy away from its dependence on the automobile industry.

== Early history ==
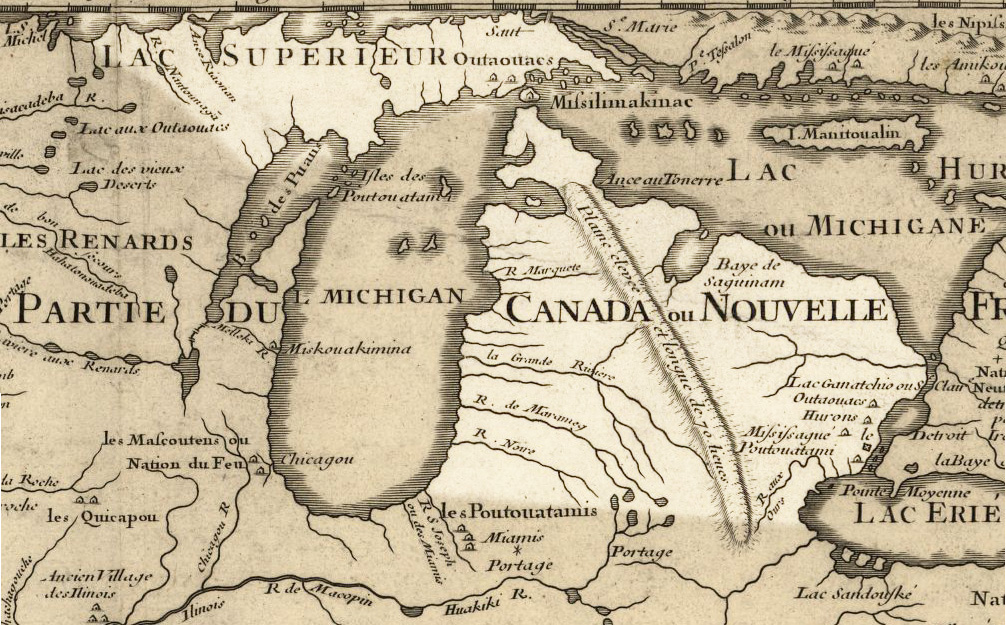
Michigan in 1718, Guillaume de L'Isle map, approximate state area highlighted

Paleo-Indians have lived in Michigan for about 12,000 years. Clovis artifacts have been found across Michigan. At the end of the Paleo-Indian period and the beginning of the archaic period caribou hunting occurred on the Alpena-Amberley ridge around 7000 BCE when lake levels were much lower. V shaped boulder hunting blinds and driving lanes have been found. The archaic period in Michigan includes the Old Copper Complex in the Western Upper Peninsula starting around 5000 BCE where copper knives and projectile points have been found. Other archaic sights include possible fishing grounds in the vicinity of Negwegon State Park from about 6000-4000 BCE.

The area was inhabited from about 1000 BCE to 1000 CE by the Native American Hopewell culture who are possible ancestors of the Odawa tribe. Hopewell burial mounds and earthworks, built by the ancestors of today's Anishinaabek people, were located across the state. Petroglyphs known as ezhibiigaadek asin, meaning "knowledge written in stone," date to between 300 and 1,500 years before European settlement. These glyphs were created by Anishnaabe people to pass down traditional knowledge, medicine, and history. An Indian trail was built around 600 BCE connecting Traverse City to Cadillac There is also evidence of a Siouan connection to Michigan, as it was reported in the Historical Collections of Michigan that the mounds in Detroit were built by the Tutelo.

According to oral histories and Wiigwaasabak birch bark scrolls, the ancestors of today's Ojibwe, Odawa, Bodewadami, Mascouten, and Miami peoples undertook a Great Migration from the mouth of the St. Lawrence River to the Upper Great Lakes some time before European arrival. These Algonquian people people from the East Coast were driven west when Iroquoian peoples migrated to the region from central Canada and took their original homelands.

Originally, the northern peninsula was largely claimed by the Ojibwe nation, although the border region of Wisconsin was claimed by the Menominee. Given that one of the oldest recorded names for the tribe was also the Mackinac, they most likely predate the other Algonquians in the region. There was also the Noquet, a tribe culturally and linguistically connected to the Menominee, who dominated the central Upper Peninsula for centuries prior to and during initial European contact, but gradually disappeared due to assimilation with the Ojibwe and Menominee. The entire southern peninsula was home to a tribe called the Mascouten until the Beaver Wars, which was probably home to a mixture of Algonquian & Siouan peoples before. Their southern border seems to very clearly be the Maumee River of Ohio & their territory extended around Lake Michigan into Indiana. During the Beaver Wars, the Iroquois of New York pushed other tribes in league with the French hard against Lake Huron, therefore several tribes migrated into Michigan & declared war on the Mascouten & Miami. The most likely identity for these tribes were the Erie, Chonnonton & Anishinaabeg. The Iroquoian tribes quickly continued on into northern & eastern Ohio & the Anishinaabeg groups seem to have formed the Sauk & Fox tribes by the time of the oldest surviving maps of the region, 1641. Either this, or the Sauk & Fox were chased into the region after defeats further east. Due to the Beaver Wars, the Mascouten migrated down to settle around the Wabash River.

Given the fact that they are culturally related & the Mascouten disappear from maps of the region around the same time that the new name appears, they may have later become known as the Wea, or Wabash tribe.

Afterwards, the Iroquois defeated the other Iroquoian tribes of northern Ohio—the Chonnonton, Erie & Petun—and continued into southern Michigan by the 1660s. With the Iroquoians having conquered the southern peninsula for themselves, the other Algonquians began to refer to the nearby lake as Michigan, which translates to "Big Cat" in their language. This is most likely supposed to be a reference to the Iroquoian water deity known as 'Blue Panther', or, more accurately, "Cat which Stalks Below." They defeated the Sauk & Fox, who migrated west and took refuge among the Ojibwe & Menominee. This caused other wars between Algonquian & Siouan peoples within the following decades.

Later, the Anishinaabeg tribes north of Lake Superior (who were already allied with the Huron) migrated down to the Lake Erie region, claiming some land in southern Michigan. In the U.S., they were known as the Odawa, & in Canada they were known as the Mississaugas—both deriving from tribal & subtribal names of the Anishinaabeg. The French migrated west, settling the colony of Illinois around 1680, which claimed all the land between the Great Lakes, Ohio River, Mississippi River & Appalachian mountains. Together with their native allies, they chased the Iroquois out of the region by 1701, forcing them to sign a treaty recognizing the Niagara River & the Ohio-Pennsylvania borders as the ends of their lands.

In the meantime, other tribes which had settled in Ohio were continuously pushed west by new settlers. Some settled in southern Michigan, however these were mostly the Iroquoian Wyandot. Rumor also has it that a group of Piscataway (an Algonquian tribe from Maryland) called the Conoy migrated into West Virginia & were noted as living around modern-day Detroit by 1819. If true, they most likely merged with the Odawa. During the War of 1812, tribes who sided against the United States were punished by seizure of land. With the Indian Removal Act (best known for causing the Trail of Tears in the south) of the 1830s, many natives were pushed away from Ohio & Michigan, many choosing to return to Canada. Despite this, many native tribesmen were able to remain, if they forwent their tribal allegiances & became American citizens. It was the later laws of 50 years later, outlawing Native American culture to control other tribes of the west, which permanently destroyed this heritage.

Map of the British and French settlements in North America in 1750, before the French and Indian War (1754 to 1763)

The Ojibwe called their land Mishi-Anishinaabaki (Mey-shih-Ah-ney-shih-nah-baaah-key), or Greater Anishinaabe Land. Since Anishinaabe was a collective term for the Ojibwe, Odawa & Potowatomi/ Nishnabe, who formed a governed confederacy known as the Three Council Fires, most of the Algonquian peoples around Lake Superior referred to their lands as 'something Anishinaabaki.' This most likely confused the French, who chose to simply translate the 'Mishi' part as "Superior." Although the Anishinaabeg (plural) did not have a true, organized government (they would usually elect temporary leaders called Ogidamoo in the moment ), the sacred site of their council fire, where they would conduct important political business, was known as Michilimackinac. Today, it is known as Mackinac Island. The Mascouten are supposedly so named for calling their original homeland of southern Michigan "Maskoutenich," or "The Treeless Land," for the Erie Plains region.

The first European explorer to visit Michigan was the Frenchman Étienne Brûlé in 1620, who began his expedition from Quebec City on the orders of Samuel de Champlain and traveled as far as the Upper Peninsula. Eventually, the area became part of Canada, one of the large colonial provinces of New France. The first permanent European settlement in Michigan was founded in 1668 at Sault Ste. Marie by Jacques Marquette, a French missionary.

The French built several trading posts, forts, and villages in Michigan during the late 17th century. Among them, the most important was Fort Pontchartrain du Détroit in 1701; it became the city of Detroit. Up until this time, French activities in the region were limited to hunting, trapping, trading with and the conversion of local Indians, and some limited subsistence farming. By 1760, the Michigan countryside had only a few hundred white inhabitants.

== From 1763 to 1776 ==
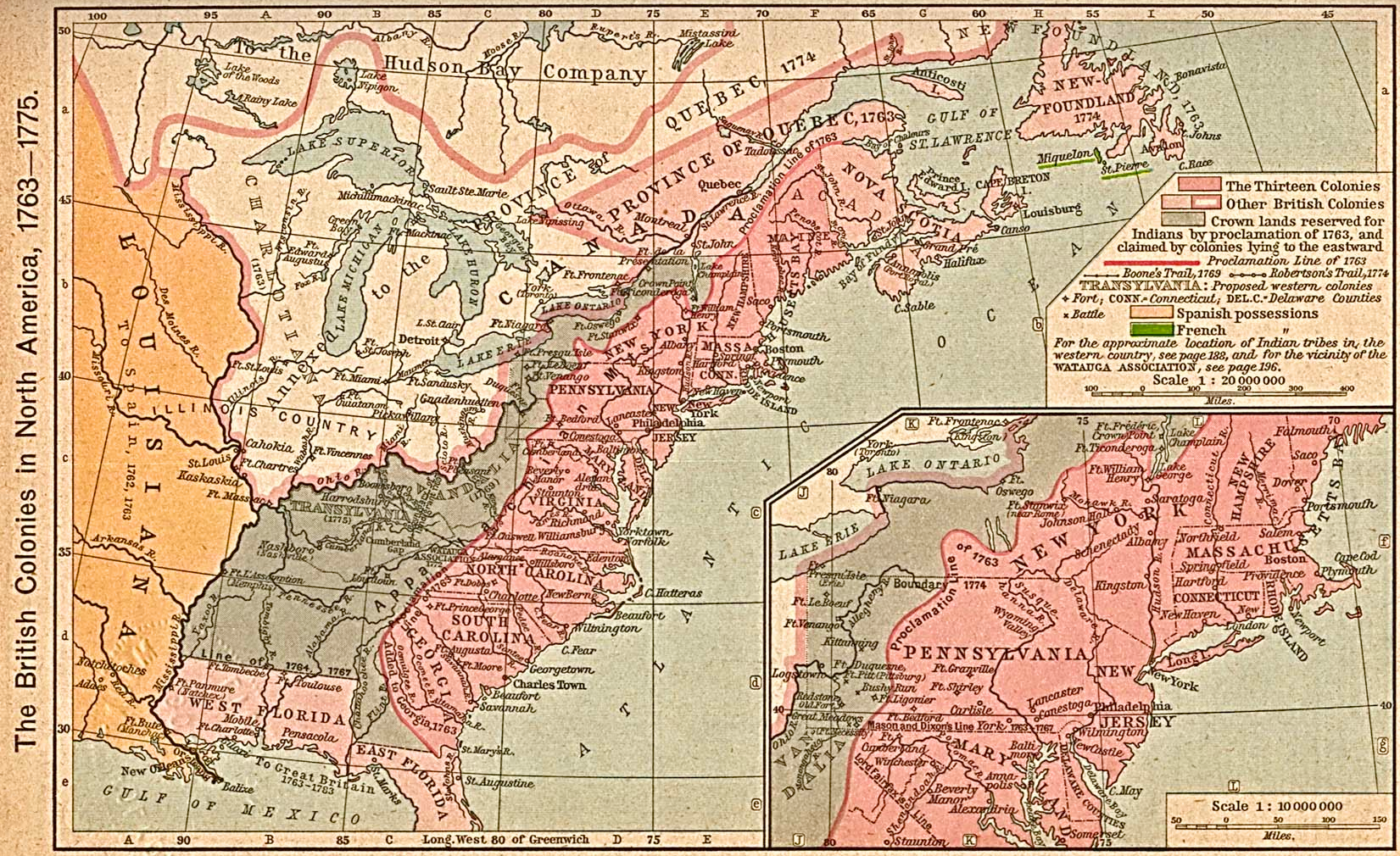
Michigan as part of the Province of Quebec 1774–1776

Territorial disputes between French and British colonists helped start the French and Indian War as part of the larger Seven Years' War, which took place from 1754 to 1763 and resulted in the defeat of France. As part of the Treaty of Paris, the French ceded all of their North American colonies east of the Mississippi River to Britain. Thus the future Michigan was handed over to the British.

However, since 1761, the Indigenous peoples in the area were increasingly displeased with the way the British treated them. In 1763, war began at Fort Detroit under the leadership of Pontiac, and quickly spread throughout the region. The war was known as Pontiac's War and lasted three years. Eight British forts were taken; others, including Fort Detroit and Fort Pitt, were held by the British garrisons. Though Pontiac's rebellion was ultimately unsuccessful, his actions would influence future indigenous resistance to European colonization in the Great Lakes Basin.

In 1774, the area was made part of the British province of Quebec. During this period Detroit grew slowly; the rest of Michigan continued to be sparsely populated because the French were more interested in the fur trade and peace with the natives than in settlement of the area.

== From 1776 to 1837 ==
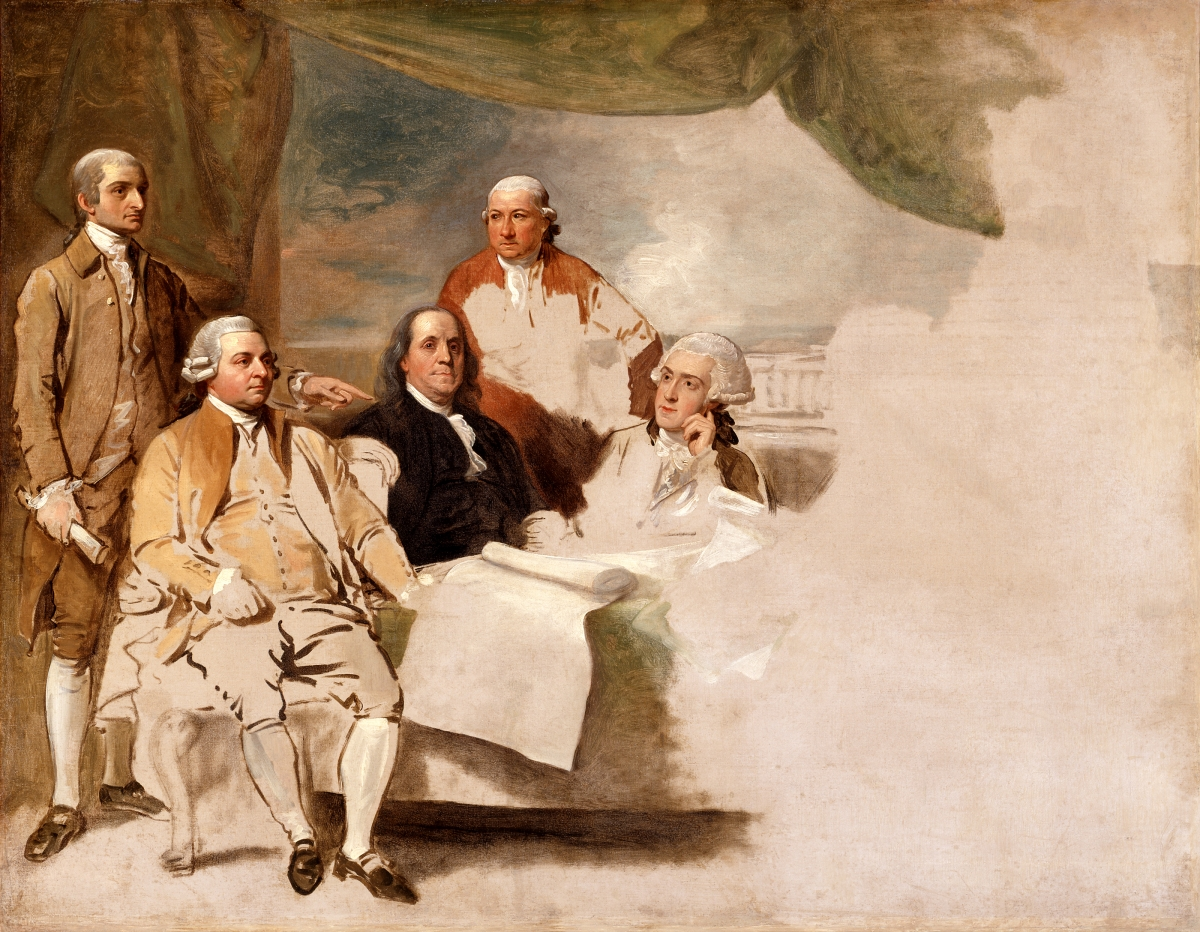
Treaty of Paris, by Benjamin West (1783), an unfinished painting of the American diplomatic negotiators of the Treaty of Paris which brought official conclusion to the Revolutionary War and gave possession of Michigan and other territory to the new United States

During the American Revolution, the local European population, who were primarily American colonists that supported independence, rebelled against Britain. The British, with the help of local tribes, used their garrison at Detroit as a staging ground for attacks on American settlements, forts, and traders in the region.

In 1781, Spanish raiders led by a French Captain Eugene Poure travelled by river and overland from St Louis, liberated British-held Fort St Joseph, and handed authority over the settlement to the Americans the following day.

The war ended with the signing of the Treaty of Paris in 1783, and Michigan passed into the control of the newly formed United States of America. The states of New York, Virginia, Massachusetts then Connecticut ceded their territorial rights over the land. In 1787, the region became part of the Northwest Territory. The majority of Indians did not recognize the new government and instead formed the Western Confederacy, led by Blue Jacket. General Anthony Wayne with his Kentucky marksmen won the Battle of Fallen Timbers which led to the end of hostilities and treaties recognizing federal government sovereignty. The British, however, continued to occupy Detroit and other fortifications. Under terms negotiated in the 1794 Jay Treaty, Britain withdrew from Detroit and Michilimackinac in 1796. Questions remained over the boundary for many years, and the United States did not have uncontested control of the Upper Peninsula and Drummond Island until 1818 and 1847, respectively.

The land which is now Michigan was made part of Indiana Territory in 1800. Most was declared as Michigan Territory in 1805, including all of the Lower Peninsula. During the War of 1812, British forces from Canada captured Detroit and Fort Mackinac as the British occupation of the Michigan Territory early on, giving them a strategic advantage and encouraging the natives revolt against the United States. American troops retook Detroit in 1813 and Fort Mackinac was returned to the Americans at the end of the war in 1815.

Over the 1810s, the indigenous Ojibwa, Ottawa, and Potawatomi tribes increasingly decided to oppose white settlement and sided with the British against the U.S. government.

Map of the original 13 colonies and their territories. Note that Michigan was the object of multiple claims.

Map of the Surveyed Part of the Territory of Michigan by Orange Risdon, 1825

After their defeat in the War of 1812, the tribes were forced to sell all of their land claims to the U.S. federal government by the Treaty of Saginaw and the Treaty of Chicago. After the war, the government built forts in some of the northwest territory, such as at Sault Ste. Marie. In the 1820s, the U.S. government assigned Indian agents to work with the tribes, including arranging land cessions and relocation. They forced most of the Native Americans to relocate from Michigan to Indian reservations further west.

In the 1820s and 1830s immigrants from New England began moving to what is now Michigan in large numbers (though there was a trickle of New England settlers who arrived before this date). These were "Yankee" settlers, that is to say they were descended from the English Puritans who settled New England during the colonial era. While most of them came to Michigan directly from New England, there were many who came from upstate New York. These were people whose parents had moved from New England to upstate New York in the immediate aftermath of the American Revolution. Due to the prevalence of New Englanders and New England transplants from upstate New York, Michigan was very culturally contiguous with early New England culture for much of its early history. The Yankee migration to Michigan was a result of several factors, one of which was the overpopulation of New England. The old stock Yankee population had large families, often bearing up to ten children in one household. Most people were expected to have their own piece of land to farm, and due to the massive and nonstop population boom, land in New England became scarce as every son claimed his own farmstead. As a result, there was not enough land for every family to have a self-sustaining farm, and Yankee settlers began leaving New England for the Midwestern United States. This resulted in Michigan's population expanding rapidly in the 1820s. The Erie Canal caused such an upsurge in immigration from New England that by 1837 "it seemed as if all New England were coming" according to one pioneer. New England families considered it a route to the "promised land". As a result of this heritage, the New England element of Michigan's population would remain culturally and politically dominant for a long time.

Michigan's oldest university, the University of Michigan was founded in Detroit in 1817 and was later moved to its present location in Ann Arbor. The state's oldest cultural institution, the Historical Society of Michigan, was established by territorial governor Lewis Cass and explorer Henry Schoolcraft in 1828.

Rising settlement prompted the elevation of Michigan Territory to that of the present-day state. In 1835, the federal government enacted a law that would have created a State of Michigan. A territorial dispute with Ohio over the Toledo Strip, a stretch of land including the city of Toledo, delayed the final accession of statehood. The disputed zone became part of Ohio by the order of a revised bill passed by the U.S. Congress and signed into law by President Andrew Jackson which also gave compensation to Michigan in the form of control of the Upper Peninsula. On January 26, 1837, Michigan became the 26th state of the Union.

== From 1837 to 1860 ==
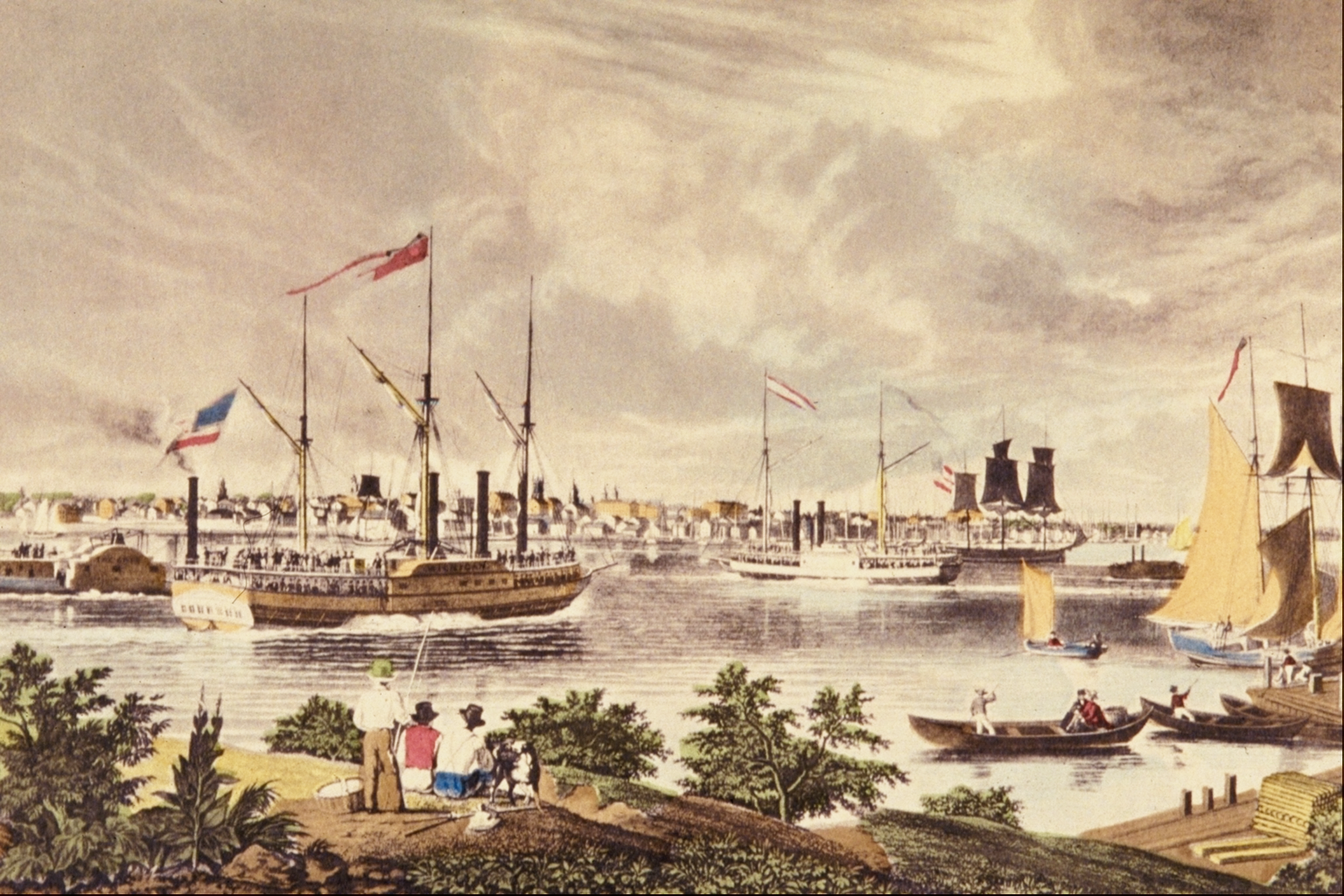
Detroit, c. 1837, after a sketch by Frederick Grain

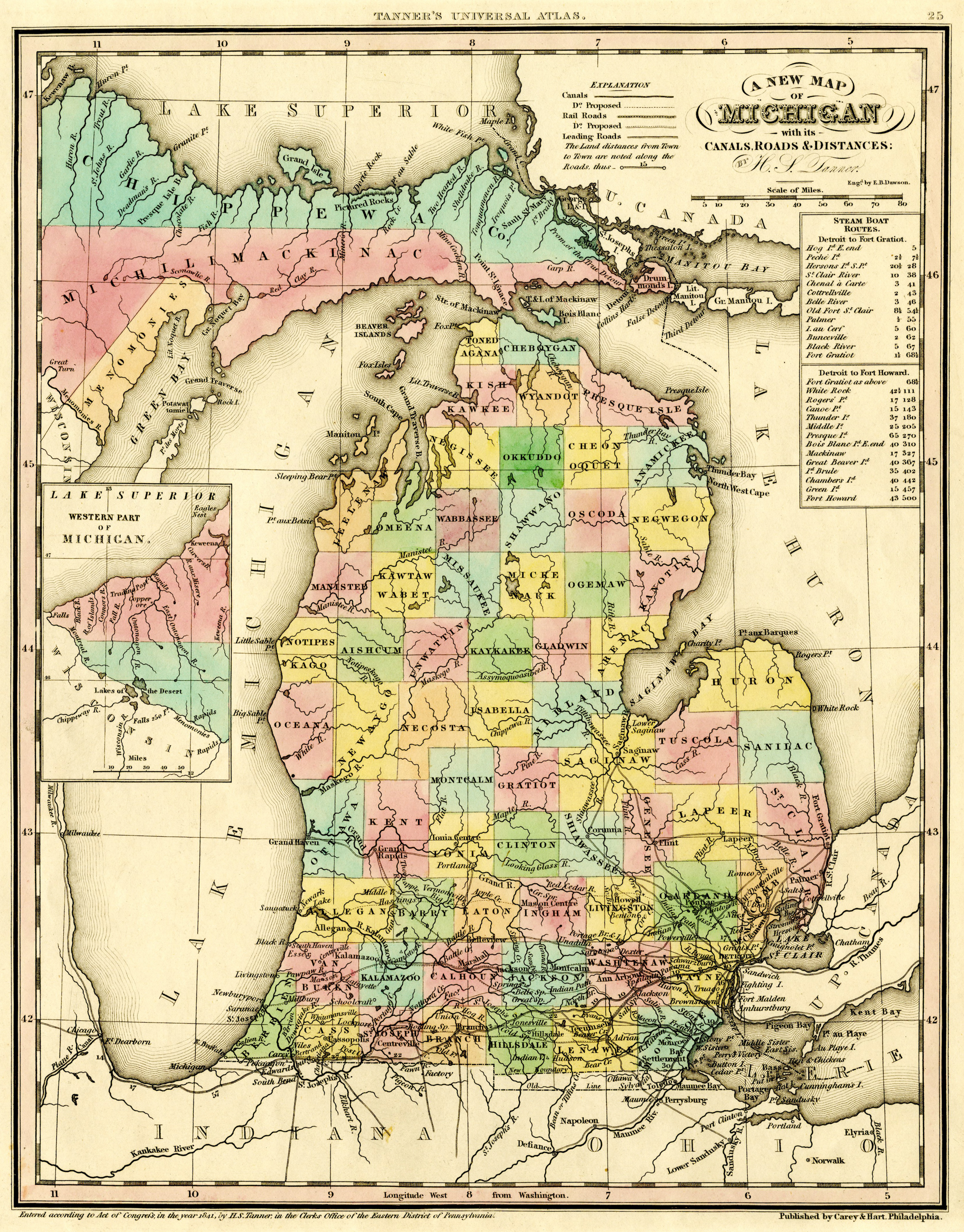
A map of Michigan by Henry Schenck Tanner, published in 1842, showing such county names as "Negwegon County," "Okkuddo County," and "Unwattin County," prior to an 1843 legislative action renaming sixteen counties in northern Michigan

Agriculture remained the main economic activity before 1860. During the early 1840s, large deposits of copper and iron ores were discovered on the Upper Peninsula. Michigan became the leading U.S. source of these ores by the end of the century, thanks to the influx of experienced Cornish miners (from England) to supervise operations. Michigan remained a frontier society up until around the time of the Civil War. Michigan pioneers were overwhelmingly of New England origins, including New England transplants from upstate New York. The amount with which the New England Yankee population predominated made Michigan unique among frontier states in the antebellum period. Due to this heritage Michigan was on the forefront of the antislavery crusade and reforms during the 1840s and 1850s. Another result of this cultural influence was the strength of the Republican Party in Michigan. Long considered a "Yankee" party, Michigan would remain heavily Republican from the Civil War until the 1960s. The state's leadership in public education is also directly attributable to the New England influence. Towns such as Vermontville, Bangor, Hartford, Rochester, Utica, and Palmyra Michigan were all named after towns in New England where the founders of those towns were from. The Congregational Church also was very strong in Michigan from most of Michigan's history, due to the New England origins of the state. New Englanders and New England transplants from Upstate New York also filled the overwhelming majority of leadership roles in Michigan's early legislatures.

=== Politics ===
During the Second Party System (1830–1854), Michigan saw highly developed political parties mobilize the great mass of adult men. The Democratic Party dominated politics before the Civil War. It comprised numerous competing factions, including the federal officeholders who tried to control party affairs, local political organizations with their state legislators and postmasters who managed affairs locally; young anti-slavery activists, typically energized by pietistic ministers in the Baptist and Methodist churches—they fueled the Free Soil Party in 1848–52; Jacksonian Democrats who opposed taxes and government spending; Catholics, Episcopalians and liturgical Germans annoyed at the moralistic pietists; and residents in the newer western districts who resented the elitism and power of Detroiters. The outstanding Democratic leader was Lewis Cass (1782–1866), who held numerous high offices and was the Democratic party's losing candidate for president in 1848. Cass was best known for his moderation and support for democracy through popular sovereignty. Nativism flared up briefly when the Democrats proposed to allow recent immigrants to vote before they became citizens, and the Whigs opposed. Fifteen of Michigan's first eighteen governors were of Yankee origins, either being from New England or being born in upstate New York to parents who were from New England.

The minority Whig party relied on conservative merchants, bankers and prosperous farmers, and especially on pietistic, moralistic Protestants from evangelical churches. Nationally, the Whig party collapsed in the 1850s as compromise proved impossible between the anti-slavery Northerners, and the pro-slavery Southerners. For a few years in the mid-1850s, nativist fears of foreign immigrants, especially Catholic Irishmen and Germans, motivated the Know-Nothing movement. It had little success beyond a brief control of city government in Marshall, Pontiac, Battle Creek, Mt. Clemens, Kalamazoo, and Grand Rapids.

The collapse of the old political system led to the realignment of voters and parties in the formation of the Third Party System, which formed in the mid-1850s and lasted until the mid-1890s. Michigan was dominated for 80 years by the new Republican Party, later nicknamed the GOP. First established in Jackson and other cities in 1854, it gathered together anti-slavery elements from the Whig, Know-Nothing and Democratic parties, and was a majority in Michigan by the end of the decade. The Democrats had always used equalitarianism as a way to attack the rich elitist Whigs. Now the Republicans turned the tables by charging that Michigan's Democrats were in bed with the South's "slave power aristocrats." The Republicans encouraged the moralistic spirit of the pietists by turning it against slavery and the liquor traffic.

== 1860 to 1900 ==
=== Civil War ===
Michigan actively participated in the American Civil War sending thousands of volunteers. The First Michigan Infantry Regiment was formed from militia from cities including Adrian, Ann Arbor, Burr Oak, Coldwater, Detroit, Jackson, Manchester, Marshall and Ypsilanti. A study of the cities of Grand Rapids and Niles shows an overwhelming surge of nationalism in 1861, whipping up enthusiasm for the war in all segments of society, and all political, religious, ethnic, and occupational groups. However, by 1862 the casualties were mounting and the war was increasingly focused on freeing the slaves in addition to preserving the Union. Copperhead Democrats called the war a failure, and it became more and more a partisan Republican effort. Michigan voters remained evenly split between the parties in the presidential election of 1864.

=== Gilded Age ===
After the war, the local economy became more varied and began to prosper. During the 1870s, the lumbering, railroads, dairy farming and diversified industry grew rapidly in the state. This led to the rise of several wealthy socialite families such as the Hartwick family. The population doubled between 1870 and 1890.

Toward the end of the century, the state government established a state school system on the German model, with public schools, high schools, normal schools or colleges for training teachers of lower grades, and colleges for classical academic studies and professors. It dedicated more funds to public education than did any other state in the nation. Within a few years, it established four-year curricula at its normal colleges for teachers, and was the first state to establish a full college program for them.

Railroads have been vital in the history of the population and trade of rough and finished goods in the state of Michigan. While some coastal settlements had previously existed supplied by sailing ships and steamers on the Great Lakes, the population, commercial, and industrial growth of the state further bloomed with the establishment of the railroad.

=== Pingree ===
In 1896, Detroit Mayor Hazen Pingree, a Yankee Republican, was elected governor. He was a social reformer who battled corporations and was an early leader of the Progressive Movement. During his four-year term, he promoted the regulation of railroad rates, equal taxation, and municipal ownership of public utilities. He also supported the direct election of U.S. senators; an eight-hour workday; an income tax; primary elections; the referendum, the abolition of child labor, and compulsory arbitration of labor disputes. Opposition from Democrats and business-oriented Republicans blocked most of his proposals. Pingree expressed the Progressive fear of corporate power, saying, "I do not condemn corporations and rich men," he said, "but I would keep them within their proper spheres. It is not safe to entrust the government of the country to the influence of Wall Street."

== 1900 to 1941 ==
Urban Michigan grew rapidly in the early 20th century, pulled along by the automobile industry in Detroit and vicinity. The breakfast cereal industry was based in Battle Creek where two Kelloggs and a Post built on the local Seventh-day Adventist heritage and put the city on the map. Less flamboyantly, thousands of machine shops opened in medium and small cities across the state.

=== Automobiles ===
During the early 20th century, manufacturing industries became the main source of revenue for Michigan – in large part, because of the automobile. In 1897, the Olds Motor Vehicle Company opened a factory in Lansing. In 1903, Ford Motor Company was also founded nearby in Detroit. In 1904 William Durant of the Flint, Michigan Durant Coach Works, a maker of horse carriages, set his sights on Buick Motor Cars which he soon acquired. With the mass production of the Ford Model T, Detroit became the world capital of the auto industry. General Motors was formed a few years later as William Durant along with Alfred Sloan purchased Oldsmobile, Cadillac, Oakland and other car companies. They soon moved their headquarters from Flint, Michigan to Detroit, Michigan. General Motors is based in Detroit, Chrysler is located in Auburn Hills, and Ford is headquartered in nearby Dearborn. Both corporations constructed large industrial complexes in the Detroit metropolitan area, exemplified by the River Rouge Plant, which have made Michigan a national leader in manufacturing since the 1910s. This industrial base produced greatly during World War I, filling a huge demand for military vehicles.

Jackson was home to one of the first car industry developments. Even before Detroit began building cars on assembly lines, Jackson was busy making parts for cars and putting them together in 1901. By 1910, the auto industry became Jackson's main industry. Over twenty different cars were once made in Jackson. Including: Reeves, Jaxon, Jackson, CarterCar, Orlo, Whiting, Butcher and Gage, Buick, Janney, Globe, Steel Swallow, C.V.I., Imperial, Ames-Dean, Cutting, Standard Electric, Duck, Briscoe, Argo, Hollier, Hackett, Marion-Handly, Gem, Earl, Wolverine, and Kaiser-Darrin. Today the auto industry remains one of the largest employers of skilled machine operators in Jackson County.

=== Immigrants ===
With the expansion of industry, hundreds of thousands of migrants from the South and immigrants from eastern and southern Europe were attracted to Detroit. In a short time, it became the fourth largest city in the country – housing shortages persisted for years even as new housing was developed throughout the city. Ethnic immigrant enclaves rapidly developed where churches, groceries, clubs and businesses supported unique communities. The WPA guide to the city in 1939 noted that there were students speaking more than 35 languages in the public schools. Ethnic festivals were a regular part of the city's culture. At the same time, fear of Catholics was strong, and fueled the nativism of the second Ku Klux Klan which recruited widely in the state. The Klan peaked in 1925, but membership fell quickly after its internal scandals were exposed. Reinhold Niebuhr, a German-American Protestant minister trained at Yale Divinity School became nationally famous as a Detroit minister who attacked the KKK, which was strong among white Protestants in the city.

=== Progressivism ===
The cities of Michigan were centers of municipal reform during the Progressive Era. Using Kalamazoo as her base, Caroline Bartlett Crane (1858–1935) became a nationally famous expert on municipal sanitation. She was nonpolitical, but scientific in her methods, and energetic in her approach. She made 60 surveys and studies in 14 states that dealt with housing conditions in tenements, of schools, jails, water and sewer systems. She identified and found solutions for air pollution. Crane had a sharp eye for inefficiency, waste, and mismanagement, and was always ready to point out improvements and explain what the best practices were in the nation.

A representative politician was George E. Ellis, mayor of Grand Rapids (1906–16). He is remembered as the most dynamic and innovative mayor in the city's history, as well as a powerful political boss who built a coalition of working-class ethnic voters, combined with middle-class reform elements. He broadened the base of political participation, and was on the left or liberal side of the political spectrum. Somewhat more conservative, and much better known, was Mayor Hazen Pingree of Detroit (1889–1896), who brought progressivism to the governor's mansion with his election in 1896. Pingree was elected mayor in 1889 by promising to expose and end corruption in city paving contracts, sewer contracts, and the school board. He fought privately owned utility monopolies, and set up competing companies owned by the city. He fought the street railway interest, demanding fares be lowered to three cents. When the depression of 1893 caused large-scale unemployment, Pingree expanded welfare programs, initiated public works programs for the unemployed, built new schools, parks, and public baths, and set aside plots of vacant city land for workers to plant their own vegetable gardens. As the Republican governor, he promoted higher railroad taxes to pay for his reforms. After Pingree left Detroit in 1897, the local Democratic ward leaders rebuilt their machine, using an ethnic base. This changed after 1910 as the old-stock Yankee Protestant business leaders, especially from the automobile industry, led a Progressive Era crusade for efficiency. They elected their own officials to office, typified by automaker James J. Couzens, who was mayor of Detroit 1919–22, and a powerful US Senator, 1922–36. The critical change took place in 1918 when the voters 1918 changed the Common Council from a 42-man body elected on a partisan basis from 21 wards, to a nine-man unit, elected on a non-partisan basis from the city at-large. The ethnics (especially the Germans) and the Democrats lost their political base.

=== Depression ===
The Great Depression caused severe economic hardship in Michigan. Thousands of auto industry workers were dismissed along with other workers from several sectors of the state economy. The financial suffering was aggravated by the fact that remaining copper reserves in the state lay deep underground. With the discovery of copper finds in other states located in less deep rock layers, local mining fell sharply and most miners left the region or resigned themselves to short hours and long unemployment. After decades of GOP dominance, the Democrats came back to power, as the business-oriented Republican economic policies had failed, the Democrats were energized, prohibition was discredited, and Franklin D. Roosevelt offered a New Deal. Washington spent heavily on relief, recovery, and reform, relieved cities of the burden of relief, and buttressed a political realignment that gave the Democratic Coalition parity with the Republican Party in Michigan. By 1936 the realignment was secure, as powerful new industrial labor unions, especially the United Auto Workers turned the factories from Republican bastions to Democratic strongholds, and the ethnic and black population had shifted to the Democrats.

Young men from relief families signed up for six-month tours in one of the state's 50 Civilian Conservation Corps camps in rural areas. They were paid five dollars a month, plus room, board, clothing and medical care, while their families received $25 a month. The Works Progress Administration was the largest federal agency. It hired more than 500,000 unemployed people (80% men) in Michigan alone to construct major public works such as roads, public buildings, and sewer systems—it was a larger labor force that the state's entire auto industry.

=== Unions ===
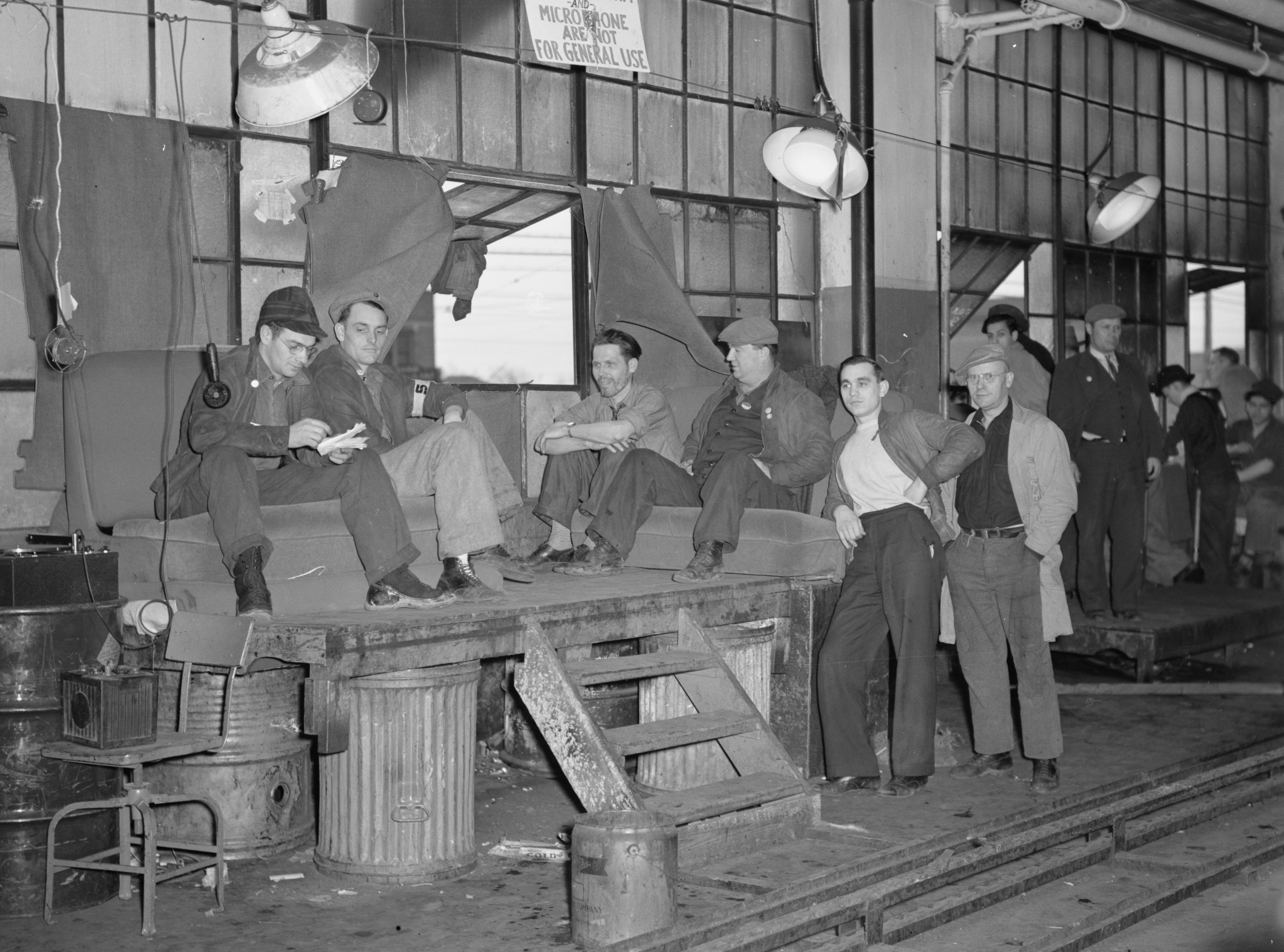
Union members occupying a General Motors body factory during the Flint Sit-Down Strike of 1937 which spurred the organization of militant CIO unions in auto industry

Thanks to new federal laws, labor unions grew rapidly after 1935, and for the first time became a major presence in large factories. The Flint Sit-Down Strike of 1936–1937 was the decisive event in the formation of the United Auto Workers Union (UAW). Strikers occupied several General Motors plants for more than forty days, and repelled (in nonviolent fashion) the efforts of the state courts, local police and National Guard to remove them. GM signed a contract that legitimized the UAW, and its membership in the next year grew from 30,000 to 500,000 members.

During World War II Walter Reuther took control of the UAW, and soon led major strikes in 1946. He ousted the Communists from the positions of power, especially at the Ford local 600. He was one of the most articulate and energetic leaders of the CIO, and of the merged AFL–CIO. Using brilliant negotiating tactics he leveraged high profits for the Big Three automakers into higher wages and superior benefits for UAW members.

== After 1941 ==
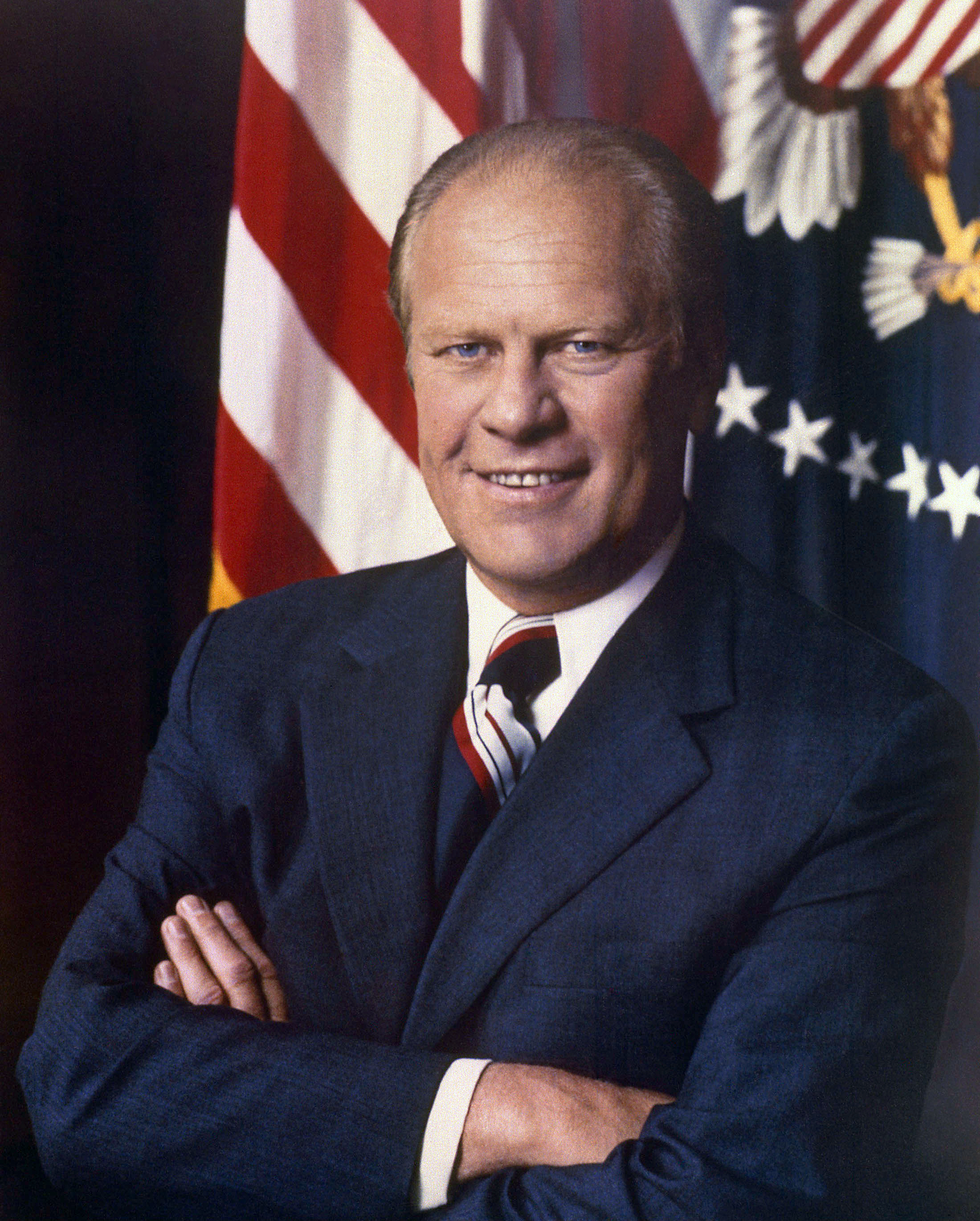
Gerald Ford, a politician from Grand Rapids who was elected to the House of Representatives thirteen times and also served as House Minority Leader and then Vice President, became the 38th President of the United States after the resignation of Richard Nixon.

The entry of the United States into World War II in 1941 the same year ended the economic contraction in Michigan. Wartime required the large-scale production of weapons and military vehicles, leading to a massive number of new jobs being filled. After the end of the war, both the automotive and copper mining industries recovered.

Starting during World War I, the Great Migration fueled the movement of hundreds of thousands of African-Americans from the South to industrial jobs in Michigan especially in Detroit. Migration of white southerners from Appalachia to the city increased the volatility of change. Population increases continued with industrial expansion during World War II and afterward. African Americans contributed to a new vibrant urban culture, with expansion of new music, food and culture.

The postwar years were initially a prosperous time for industrial workers, who achieved middle-class livelihoods, fostered the Baby Boom, and sought better, more spacious housing in safer neighborhoods. These were the years of the creation and popularity of Motown Records. By late mid-century, however, deindustrialization and restructuring cost many jobs. The economy suffered and the city postponed needed changes. Neglect of social problems and urban decline fed racial conflicts. In 1967 there was a major riot in Detroit that burned out the inner city, caused tens of millions of dollars in damages, and resulted in 43 deaths with the U.S. Army being called in to stop it. The violence then spread to several other Michigan cities and was the trigger for a mass migration to the suburbs.

The 1973 Oil Crisis caused economic recession in the United States and greatly affected the Michigan economy. Afterward, automobile companies in the United States faced greater multinational competition, especially from Japan. As a consequence, domestic auto makers enacted cost-cutting measures to remain competitive at home and abroad. Unemployment rates rose dramatically in the state.

Throughout the 1970s, Michigan possessed the highest unemployment rate of any U.S. state. Large spending cuts to education and public health were repeatedly made in an attempt to reduce growing state budget deficits. A strengthening of the auto industry and an increase in tax revenue stabilized government and household finances in the 1980s. Increasing competition by Japanese and South Korean auto companies continues to challenge the state economy, which depends heavily on the automobile industry. Since the late 1980s, the Michigan government has actively sought to attract new industries, thus reducing economic reliance on a single sector.

== Women ==
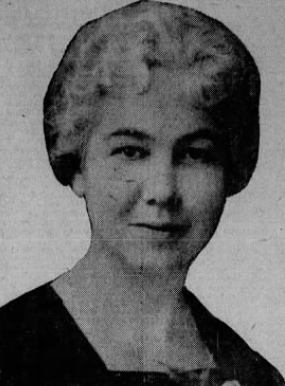
Cora Reynolds Anderson became the first woman elected to the House of Representatives in Michigan in 1925.

In 1844 Michigan passed "An Act to Define and Protect the Rights of Married Women," which allowed women to retain property that brought to a marriage instead of it automatically transferring to their husbands and allowing them to retain anything they received as a gift or inheritance while married.

Most young women took jobs before marriage, then quit. Before the growth of high schools after 1900, most women left school after the 8th grade at about age 15. Ciani (2005) shows that type of work they did reflected their ethnicity and marital status. African American mothers often chose day labor, usually as domestic servants, because of the flexibility it afforded. Most mothers receiving pensions were white and sought work only when necessary.

During the early 1900s and across the state middle class homemakers shaped numerous new and expanded charitable and professional associations, and promoted mothers' pensions, and expanded forms of social welfare. Many of the Protestant homemakers were active in the temperance and suffrage movements as well. The Detroit Federation of Women's Clubs (DFWC) promoted a very wide range of activities for civic minded middle-class women who conformed to traditional gender roles. The Federation argued that safety and health issues were of greatest concern to mothers and could only be solved by improving municipal conditions outside the home. The Federation pressured Detroit officials to upgrade schools, water supplies and sanitation facilities, and to require safe food handling, and traffic safety. However, the membership was divided on going beyond these issues or collaborating with ethnic or groups or labor unions; it refused to stretch traditional gender boundaries, giving it a conservative reputation. It was during this period that women began to make advancements in economic, political and social equality.

Michigan ratified the 19th Amendment on June 10, 1919, becoming one of the first states to do so. It was not long after that they began to serve within the government. Eva McCall Hamilton was elected for the senate in 1920, and Cora Reynolds Anderson, a member of the Chippewa Tribe, was the first elected to the House of Representatives in 1925.

== See also ==
- Timeline of Michigan history
- Historical outline of Michigan
- History of Detroit
- History of Ford Motor Company
- History of General Motors
- History of railroads in Michigan
- List of historical societies in Michigan
- Northwest Ordinance
- List of museums in Michigan

== Other resources ==
- Bureau of Business Research, Wayne State U. Michigan Statistical Abstract (1987).
- Clarke Historical Library, Central Michigan University, Bibliographies for Michigan by region, counties, etc..
- Michigan, State of. Michigan Manual (annual), elaborate detail on state government.
- Michigan Historical Review Central Michigan University (quarterly).
- Public Sector Consultants. Michigan in Brief. An Issues Handbook (annual)
- Larry J. Wagenaar and Izzi Bendall. Michigan History Directory of Historical Societies, Museums, Archives, Historic Sites, Agencies and Commissions (13th Ed. 2011)
