= 1959 in Michigan =

- Decades: 1930s; 1940s; 1950s; 1960s; 1970s
- See also: History of Michigan; Historical outline of Michigan; List of years in Michigan; 1959 in the United States

Events from the year 1959 in Michigan.

== Top stories ==
The Associated Press and Detroit Free Press ranked the top Michigan news stories of 1959 as follows:

- Lansing tax debate (AP-1, 435 points; DFP-1)
- The murder of State Trooper Albert W. Souden near Brighton and the arrest of his accused killer (AP-2, 318 points)
- The September 22 drowning of 12 members of a family when their small boat was swamped (AP-3, 252 points)
- The Michigan Supreme Court's October 21 ruling that the state's four cent sales tax was unconstitutional (AP-4)
- Automobile industry's introduction of new, compact cars (AP-5, 214 points; DFP-2)
- A University of Michigan student who hid in a church belfry for months (AP-6, 165 points)
- The negative impact of the 116-day steel strike of 1959 on the automobile industry (AP-7, 149 points)
- The Detroit Tigers' firing manager Bill Norman and hiring of Jimmy Dykes (AP-8, 109 points)
- The accidental death in November of former General Motors vice president Harry W. Anderson, shot by former General Motors CEO Harlow Curtice while duck hunting on St. Anne Island in the St. Clair River (AP-9, 107 points; DFP-5)
- The Michigan 59ers, a group of Michigander who left the state in March in order to homestead and form a farm community in Alaska called New Michigan (AP-10, 87 points; DFP-3)
- Saint Lawrence Seaway opened, and from June 27 to July 9 Queen Elizabeth II and Prince Philip passed through the seaway aboard on the royal yacht HMY Britannia with stops in Windsor and Sarnia on July 2 and 3 (DFP-4)

== Office holders ==
=== State office holders ===
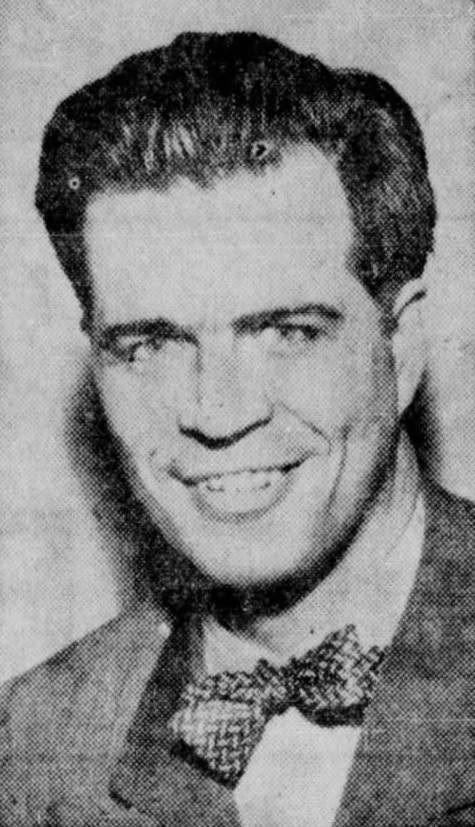
Gov. G. Mennen Williams

- Governor of Michigan: G. Mennen Williams (Democrat)
- Lieutenant Governor of Michigan: John Swainson (Democrat)
- Michigan Attorney General: Paul Adams
- Michigan Secretary of State: James M. Hare (Democrat)
- Speaker of the Michigan House of Representatives: Don R. Pears (Republican)
- Majority Leader of the Michigan Senate: Frank D. Beadle (Republican)
- Chief Justice, Michigan Supreme Court: John R. Dethmers

=== Mayors of major cities ===
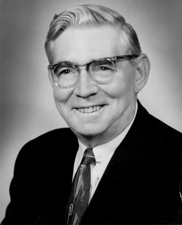
Patrick V. McNamara

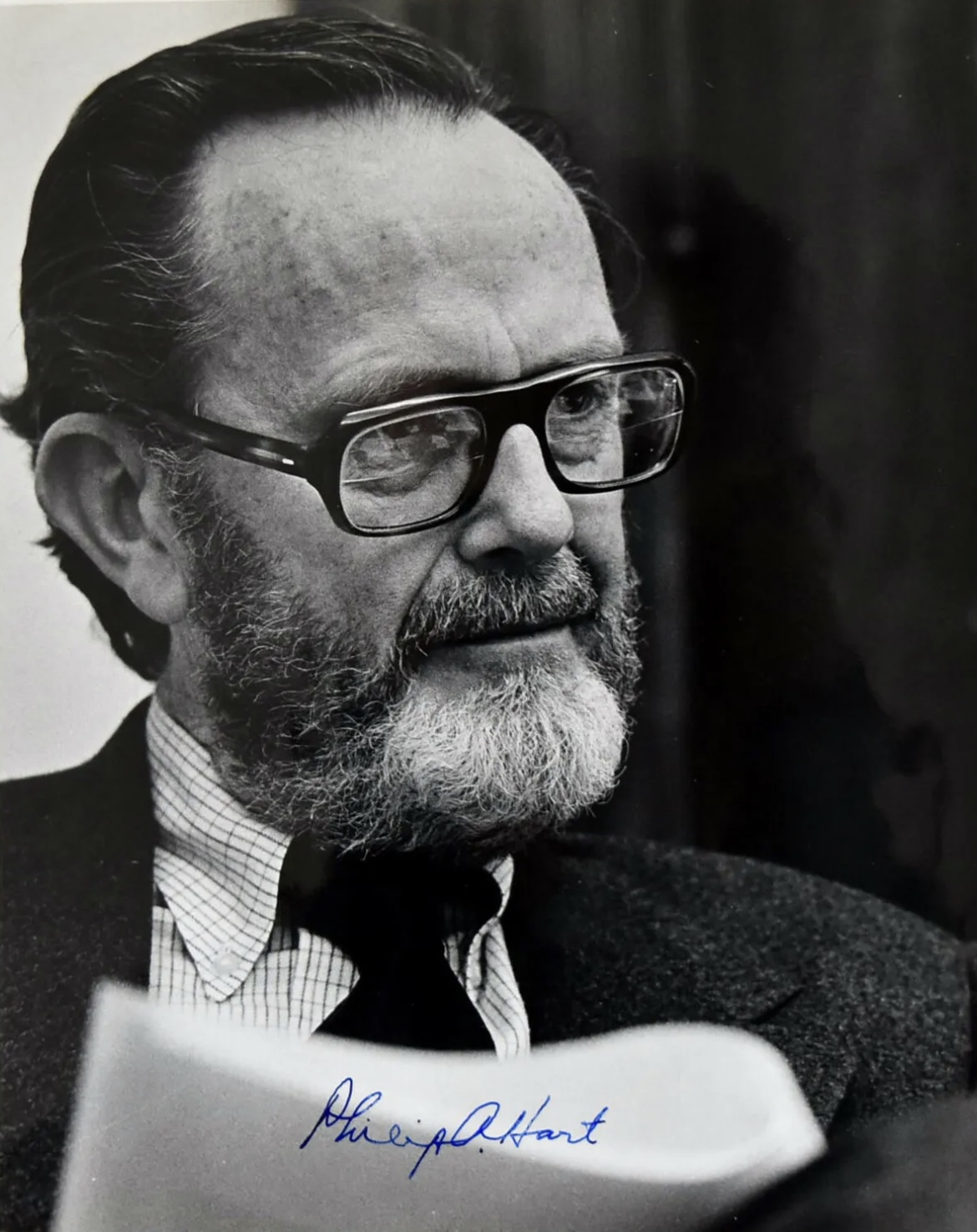
Philip Hart

- Mayor of Detroit: Louis Miriani
- Mayor of Grand Rapids: Stanley J. Davis
- Mayor of Warren, Michigan: Ted Bates
- Mayor of Flint: Robert J. Egan
- Mayor of Saginaw: R. James Harvey/R. Dewey Stearns
- Mayor of Dearborn: Orville L. Hubbard
- Mayor of Lansing: Ralph Crego
- Mayor of Ann Arbor: Samuel J. Eldersveld/Cecil Creal

=== Federal office holders ===
- U.S. Senator from Michigan: Patrick V. McNamara (Democrat)
- U.S. Senator from Michigan: Philip Hart (Democrat)
- House District 1: Thaddeus M. Machrowicz (Democrat)
- House District 2: George Meader (Republican)
- House District 3: August E. Johansen (Republican)
- House District 4: Clare Hoffman (Republican)
- House District 5: Gerald Ford (Republican)
- House District 6: Charles E. Chamberlain (Republican)
- House District 7: James G. O'Hara (Democrat)
- House District 8: Alvin Morell Bentley (Republican)
- House District 9: Robert P. Griffin (Republican)
- House District 10: Elford Albin Cederberg (Republican)
- House District 11: Victor A. Knox (Republican)
- House District 12: John B. Bennett (Republican)
- House District 13: Charles Diggs (Democrat)
- House District 14: Louis C. Rabaut (Democrat)
- House District 15: John Dingell Jr. (Democrat)
- House District 16: John Lesinski Jr. (Democrat)
- House District 17: Martha Griffiths (Democrat)
- House District 18: William Broomfield (Republican)

== Population ==
In the 1950 United States census, Michigan was recorded as having a population of 6,421,000 persons, ranking as the seventh most populous state in the country. By 1960, the state's population had grown 22.8% to 7,823,194 persons.

=== Cities ===
The following is a list of cities in Michigan with a population of at least 40,000 based on 1950 U.S. Census data. Historic census data from 1940 and 1960 is included to reflect trends in population increases or decreases. Cities that are part of the Detroit metropolitan area are shaded in tan.

| 1950 Rank | City | County | 1940 Pop. | 1950 Pop. | 1960 Pop. | Change 1950-60 |
|---|---|---|---|---|---|---|
| 1 | Detroit | Wayne | 1,623,452 | 1,849,568 | 1,670,144 | −9.7% |
| 2 | Grand Rapids | Kent | 164,292 | 176,515 | 177,313 | 0.5% |
| 3 | Flint | Genesee | 151,543 | 163,143 | 196,940 | 20.7% |
| 4 | Dearborn | Wayne | 63,589 | 94,994 | 112,007 | 17.9% |
| 5 | Saginaw | Saginaw | 82,794 | 92,918 | 98,265 | 5.8% |
| 6 | Lansing | Ingham | 78,753 | 92,129 | 107,807 | 17.0% |
| 7 | Pontiac | Oakland | 66,626 | 73,681 | 82,233 | 11.6% |
| 8 | Kalamazoo | Kalamazoo | 54,097 | 57,704 | 82,089 | 42.4% |
| 9 | Bay City | Bay | 47,956 | 52,523 | 53,604 | 2.1% |
| 10 | Jackson | Jackson | 49,656 | 51,088 | 50,720 | −0.7% |
| 11 | Battle Creek | Calhoun | 43,453 | 48,666 | 44,169 | −9.2% |
| 12 | Muskegon | Muskegon | 47,697 | 48,429 | 46,485 | −4.0% |
| 13 | Ann Arbor | Washtenaw | 29,815 | 48,251 | 67,340 | 39.6% |
| 14 | Royal Oak | Oakland | 25,087 | 46,898 | 80,612 | 71.9% |
| 15 | Warren | Macomb | 23,658 | 42,653 | 89,246 | 109.2% |

=== Counties ===
The following is a list of counties in Michigan with populations of at least 100,000 based on 1950 U.S. Census data. Historic census data from 1940 and 1960 are included to reflect trends in population increases or decreases. Counties that are part of the Detroit metropolitan area are shaded in tan.

| 1980 Rank | County | Largest city | 1940 Pop. | 1950 Pop. | 1960 Pop. | Change 1950-60 |
|---|---|---|---|---|---|---|
| 1 | Wayne | Detroit | 2,015,623 | 2,435,235 | 2,666,297 | 9.5% |
| 2 | Oakland | Pontiac | 254,068 | 396,001 | 690,259 | 74.3% |
| 3 | Kent | Grand Rapids | 246,338 | 288,292 | 363,187 | 26.0% |
| 4 | Genesee | Flint | 227,944 | 270,963 | 374,313 | 38.1% |
| 5 | Macomb | Warren | 107,638 | 184,961 | 405,804 | 119.4% |
| 6 | Ingham | Lansing | 130,616 | 172,941 | 211,296 | 22.2% |
| 7 | Saginaw | Saginaw | 130,468 | 153,515 | 190,752 | 24.3% |
| 8 | Washtenaw | Ann Arbor | 80,810 | 134,606 | 172,440 | 28.1% |
| 9 | Kalamazoo | Kalamazoo | 100,085 | 126,707 | 169,712 | 33.9% |
| 10 | Muskegon | Muskegon | 94,501 | 121,545 | 129,943 | 6.9% |
| 11 | Calhoun | Battle Creek | 94,206 | 120,813 | 138,858 | 14.9% |
| 12 | Berrien | Benton Harbor | 89,117 | 115,702 | 149,865 | 29.5% |
| 13 | Jackson | Jackson | 93,108 | 108,168 | 131,994 | 22.0% |

== Sports ==
=== Baseball ===
- 1959 Detroit Tigers season – Under managers Bill Norman and Jimmy Dykes, the Tigers compiled a 75–79 record and finished in fourth place in the American League. The team's statistical leaders included Harvey Kuenn with a .353 batting average, Charlie Maxwell with 31 home runs and 95 RBIs, and Don Mossi with a 3.36 earned run average.
- 1959 Michigan Wolverines baseball team - Under head coach Don Lund, the Wolverines compiled a 10–17–2 record. Jim Dickey was the team captain.

=== American football ===
- 1959 Detroit Lions season – The Lions, under head coach George Wilson, compiled a 3–8–1 record. The team's statistical leaders included Earl Morrall with 1,102 passing yards, Nick Pietrosante and 447 rushing yards, Jim Gibbons with 431 receiving yards, and Howard Cassady with 30 points scored.
- 1959 Michigan State Spartans football team – Under head coach Duffy Daugherty, the Spartans compiled a 5–4 record. The team's statistical leaders included Dean Look with 785 passing yards and Herb Adderly with 419 rushing yards and 265 receiving yards.
- 1959 Michigan Wolverines football team – Under head coach Bump Elliott, the Wolverines compiled a 4-5 record. The team's statistical leaders included Stan Noskin with 747 passing yards, Fred Julian with 289 rushing yards, and Robert Johnson with 264 receiving yards.
- 1959 Central Michigan Chippewas football team – Under head coach Kenneth "Bill" Kelly, the Chippewas compiled a 7–3 record.
- 1959 Western Michigan Broncos football team – Under head coach Merle Schlosser, the Broncos compiled a 4–5 record.
- 1959 Eastern Michigan Hurons football team – Under head coach Fred Trosko, the Hurons compiled a 1–7 record.
- 1959 Detroit Titans football team – The Titans compiled a 6–4 record under head coach Jim Miller.

=== Basketball ===
- 1958–59 Detroit Pistons season – Under head coach Red Rocha, the Pistons compiled a 28–44 record. The team's statistical leaders included Gene Shue with 1,266 points, Walter Dukes with 958 rebounds, and Dick McGuire with 443 assists.
- 1958–59 Michigan State Spartans men's basketball team – Under head coach Forddy Anderson, the Spartans compiled a 19–4 record and advanced to the NCAA tournament where they won Mideast Regional semifinal against Marquette, then lost the Mideast Regional Final to Louisville. Bob Anderegg led the team with an average of 19.6 points per game.
- 1958–59 Michigan Wolverines men's basketball team – Under head coach William Perigo, the Wolverines compiled a 15–7 record. M.C. Burton, Jr. won the Big Ten Conference statistical championships for both scoring (22.6 points per game) and rebounding (249 in 14 conference games for a 17.8 rebound average). Burton was the first player to lead the conference in both scoring and rebounding.
- 1958–59 Detroit Titans men's basketball team – The Titans compiled an 11–14 record under head coach Bob Calihan.
- 1958–59 Western Michigan Broncos men's basketball team – Under head coach Don Boven, the Broncos compiled a 1–11 record.

=== Ice hockey ===
- 1958–59 Detroit Red Wings season – Under head coach Sid Abel, the Red Wings compiled a 25–37–8 record and finished in sixth place in the National Hockey League. Gordie Howe led the team with 32 goals, 46 assists, and 78 points. The team's goaltender was Terry Sawchuk.
- 1958–59 Michigan Wolverines men's ice hockey season – Under head coach Al Renfrew, the Wolverines compiled an 8–13–1 record.
- 1958–59 Michigan Tech Huskies men's ice hockey team – Under head coach John MacInnes, Michigan Tech compiled a 16–10–1 record.
- 1958–59 Michigan State Spartans men's ice hockey team – Under head coach Amo Bessone, the Spartans compiled a 17–6–1 record. and placed second at the 1959 NCAA Division I men's ice hockey tournament, losing to North Dakota in the championship game.

=== Boat racing ===
- Port Huron to Mackinac Boat Race –
- APBA Gold Cup – Bill Stead

=== Golf ===
- Michigan Open – Dave Hill
- Motor City Open - Mike Souchak

== Births ==
- February 5 - Jennifer Granholm, 47th Governor of Michigan, in Vancouver
- June 19 - Mark DeBarge, part of the Motown family group DeBarge and songwriter ("Stay with Me"), in Detroit
- August 14 - Magic Johnson, basketball player for Los Angeles Lakers (1979–1991, 1996), 5x NBA champion, 3x NBA MVP, in Lansing, Michigan
- September 21 - Dave Coulier, actor (Full House) and stand-up comedian, in St. Clair Shores, Michigan
- October 23 - Sam Raimi, film director (Evil Dead series, the original Spider-Man trilogy, and Darkman) and screenwriter, in Royal Oak, Michigan
- no date - Bill Morrison, comic book artist and writer, co-founder and creative director of Bongo Comics (1993-2012), in Lincoln Park, Michigan

=== Gallery of 1959 births ===
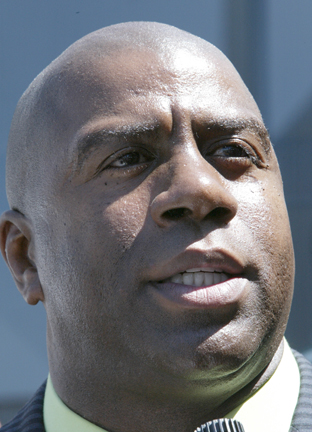
Magic Johnson

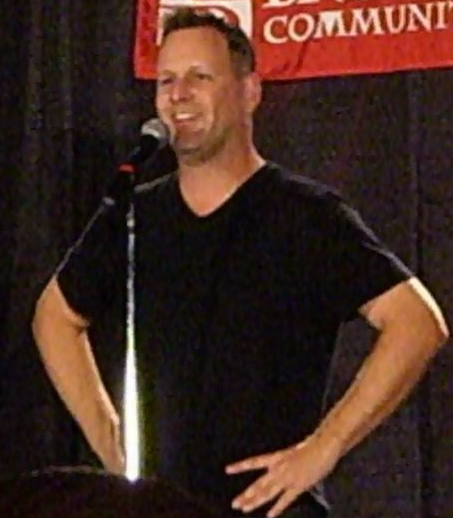
Dave Coulier

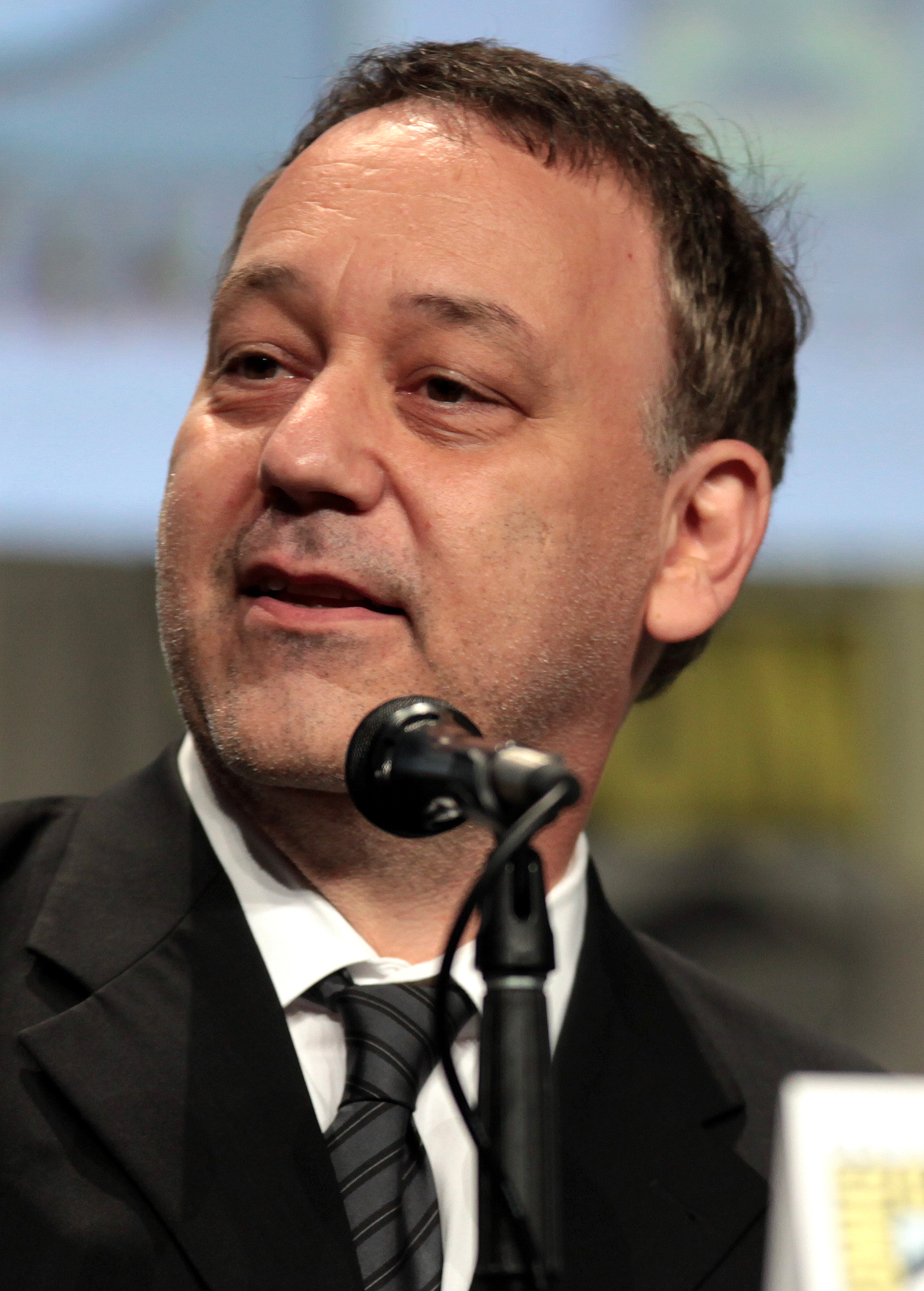
Sam Raimi

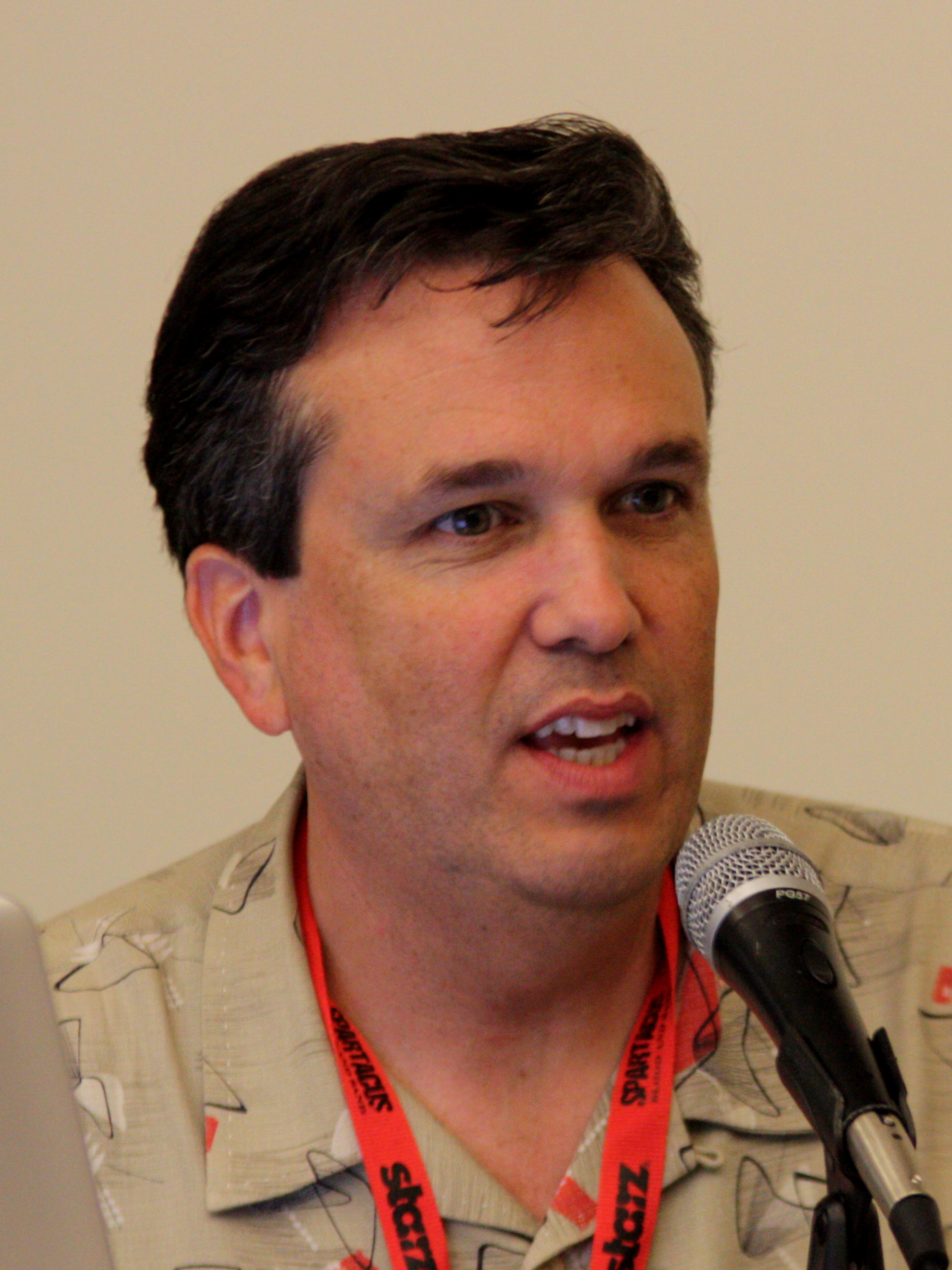
Bill Morrison

== Deaths ==
- March 17 - Howard Ehmke, pitcher for Detroit Tigers (1916–1922), at age 64 in Philadelphia
- April 9 - John Herrmann, writer who lived in Paris in the 1920s as part of its famous expatriate American writers' circle, at age 58 in Mexico
- May 15 - Clarence J. McLeod, Congressman from Michigan (1920–1941), at age 63 in Detroit
- August 5 - Edgar Guest, poet who became known as the "People's Poet", at age 77 in Detroit
- September 7 - Charline White, first African-American woman to be elected to the Michigan Legislature, at age 39 in Detroit
- December 2 - Albert J. Engel, Congressman from Michigan (1935–1951), at age 71 in Grand Rapids

=== Gallery of 1959 deaths ===
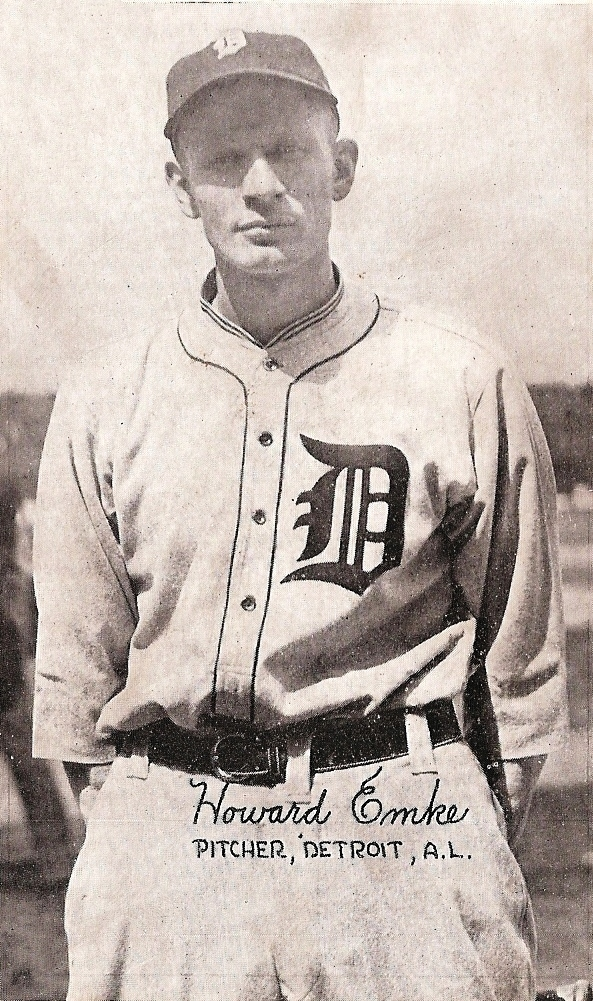
Howard Ehmke

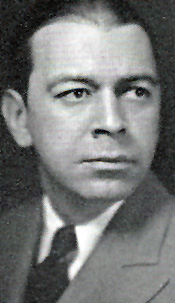
Clarence J. McLeod

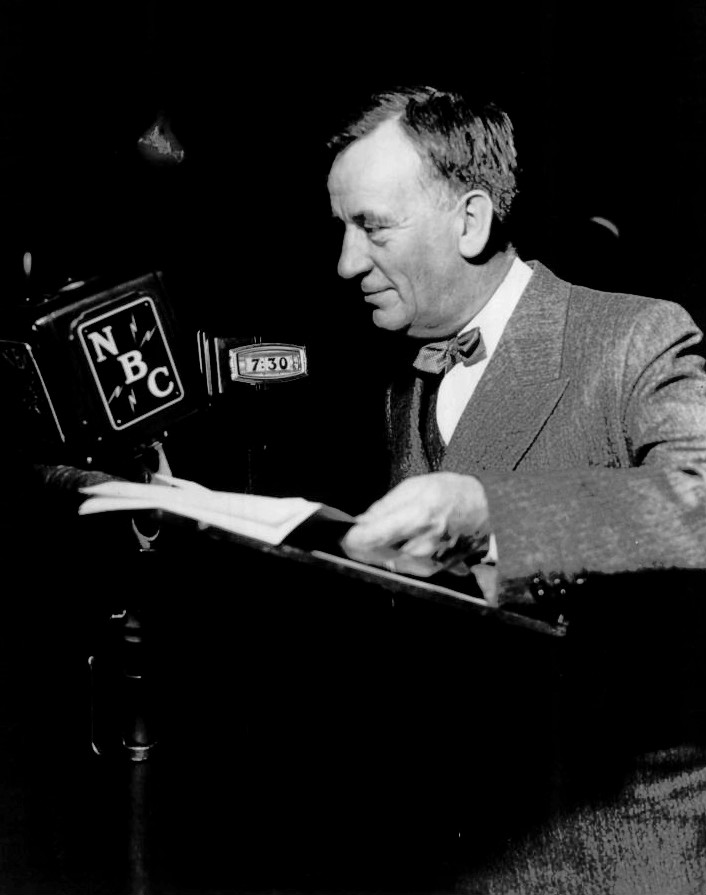
Edgar Guest

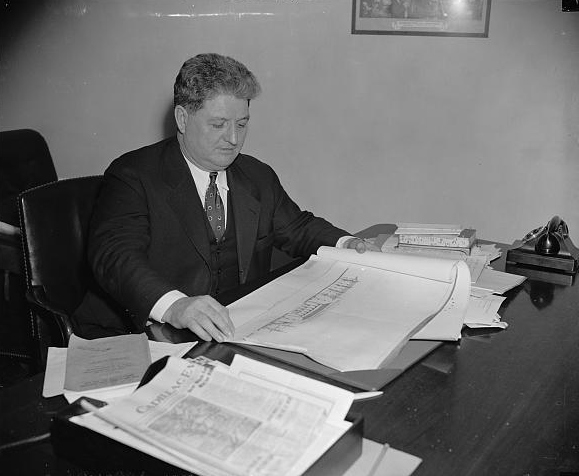
Albert J. Engel

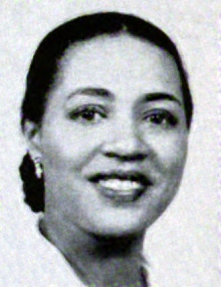
Charline White

== See also ==
- History of Michigan
- History of Detroit
