= 1958 in Michigan =

- Decades: 1930s; 1940s; 1950s; 1960s; 1970s
- See also: History of Michigan; Historical outline of Michigan; List of years in Michigan; 1958 in the United States

Events from the year 1958 in Michigan.

== Top stories ==
The Associated Press ranked the top Michigan news stories of 1958 as follows:

- The November 18 sinking of the SS Carl D. Bradley in a Lake Michigan storm, resulting in the death of 33 of 35 crew members (AP-1, 350 points)
- The April 6 crash of Capital Airlines Flight 67 into Saginaw Bay on final approach to Freeland, Michigan, resulting in the deaths of all 47 persons on board (AP-2, 285 points)
- The Democratic Party's sweep of the November election (AP-3, 240 points))
- The case of Frank Kierdorf, business agent for Teamsters Local 332 in Flint, who was taken at gunpoint to a wooded area in Oakland County, set on fire, and then dropped off at St. Joseph Mercy Hospital in Pontiac (AP-4, 239 points)
- Dedication of the Mackinac Bridge (AP-5, 191 points)
- Negotiations and strikes between the UAW and Big Three automobile manufacturers (AP-6, 180 points)
- Proposal to create a state income tax (AP-7)
- Record unemployment (AP-8)
- Slump in the automobile industry (AP-9)
- 1958 Detroit Tigers season, including the June 9 firing of manager Jack Tighe, the drop to fifth place, and the trade of Billy Martin to Cleveland (AP-10)

The United Press International ranked the state's top sports stories of 1958 as follows:

- The 1958 Michigan State Spartans football team, picked before the season to win the Big Ten championship, disappointed with a 3–5–1 record (0–5–1 Big Ten) (UPI-1)
- Pitcher Frank Lary, who came into the 1958 season with a 9-4 record against the New York Yankees, won seven games against the Yankees (UPI-2)
- The 1958 Michigan Wolverines football team's loss to Northwestern by a 55-24 score, the worst beating in program history (UPI-3)
- Pitcher Jim Bunning's July 20 no-hitter against the Boston Red Sox (UPI-4)
- The Detroit Tigers' June 9 firing of manager Jack Tighe (UPI-5)

== Office holders ==
=== State office holders ===
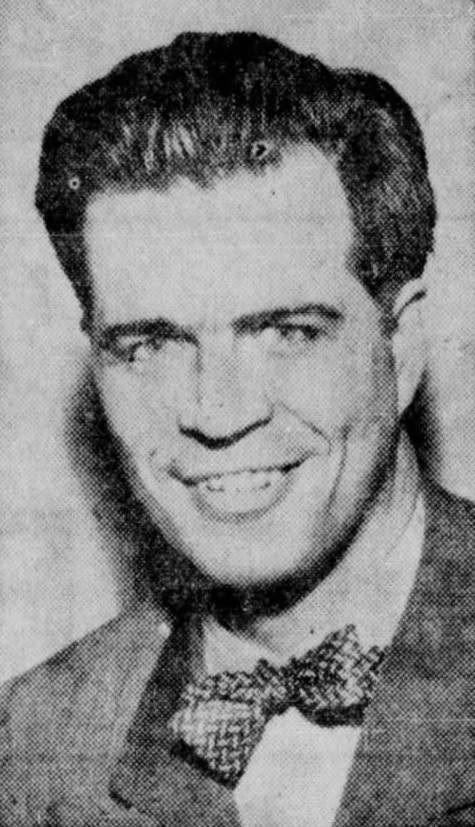
Gov. G. Mennen Williams

- Governor of Michigan: G. Mennen Williams (Democrat)
- Lieutenant Governor of Michigan: Philip Hart (Democrat)
- Michigan Attorney General: Paul Adams
- Michigan Secretary of State: James M. Hare (Democrat)
- Speaker of the Michigan House of Representatives: George Van Peursem (Republican)
- Chief Justice, Michigan Supreme Court: John R. Dethmers

=== Mayors of major cities ===
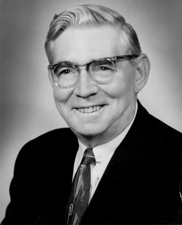
Patrick V. McNamara

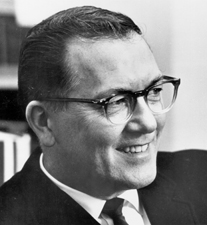
Robert P. Griffin

- Mayor of Detroit: Louis Miriani
- Mayor of Grand Rapids: Paul G. Goebel/Stanley J. Davis
- Mayor of Warren, Michigan: Ted Bates
- Mayor of Flint: George M. Algoe/Robert J. Egan
- Mayor of Saginaw: R. James Harvey
- Mayor of Dearborn: Orville L. Hubbard
- Mayor of Lansing: Ralph Crego
- Mayor of Ann Arbor: Samuel J. Eldersveld

=== Federal office holders ===
- U.S. Senator from Michigan: Patrick V. McNamara (Democrat)
- U.S. Senator from Michigan: Charles E. Potter (Republican)
- House District 1: Thaddeus M. Machrowicz (Democrat)
- House District 2: George Meader (Republican)
- House District 3: August E. Johansen (Republican)
- House District 4: Clare Hoffman (Republican)
- House District 5: Gerald Ford (Republican)
- House District 6: Charles E. Chamberlain (Republican)
- House District 7: Robert J. McIntosh (Republican)
- House District 8: Alvin Morell Bentley (Republican)
- House District 9: Robert P. Griffin (Republican)
- House District 10: Elford Albin Cederberg (Republican)
- House District 11: Victor A. Knox (Republican)
- House District 12: John B. Bennett (Republican)
- House District 13: Charles Diggs (Democrat)
- House District 14: Louis C. Rabaut (Democrat)
- House District 15: John Dingell Jr. (Democrat)
- House District 16: John Lesinski Jr. (Democrat)
- House District 17: Martha Griffiths (Democrat)
- House District 18: William Broomfield (Republican)

== Population ==
In the 1950 United States census, Michigan was recorded as having a population of 6,421,000 persons, ranking as the seventh most populous state in the country. By 1960, the state's population had grown 22.8% to 7,823,194 persons.

=== Cities ===
The following is a list of cities in Michigan with a population of at least 40,000 based on 1950 U.S. Census data. Historic census data from 1940 and 1960 is included to reflect trends in population increases or decreases. Cities that are part of the Detroit metropolitan area are shaded in tan.

1950 Rank	City	County	1940 Pop.	1950 Pop.	1960 Pop.	Change 1950-60
1	Detroit	Wayne	1,623,452	1,849,568	1,670,144	−9.7%
2	Grand Rapids	Kent	164,292	176,515	177,313	0.5%
3	Flint	Genesee	151,543	163,143	196,940	20.7%
4	Dearborn	Wayne	63,589	94,994	112,007	17.9%
5	Saginaw	Saginaw	82,794	92,918	98,265	5.8%
6	Lansing	Ingham	78,753	92,129	107,807	17.0%
7	Pontiac	Oakland	66,626	73,681	82,233	11.6%
8	Kalamazoo	Kalamazoo	54,097	57,704	82,089	42.4%
9	Bay City	Bay	47,956	52,523	53,604	2.1%
10	Jackson	Jackson	49,656	51,088	50,720	−0.7%
11	Battle Creek	Calhoun	43,453	48,666	44,169	−9.2%
12	Muskegon	Muskegon	47,697	48,429	46,485	−4.0%
13	Ann Arbor	Washtenaw	29,815	48,251	67,340	39.6%
14	Royal Oak	Oakland	25,087	46,898	80,612	71.9%
15	Warren	Macomb	23,658	42,653	89,246	109.2%

=== Counties ===
The following is a list of counties in Michigan with populations of at least 100,000 based on 1950 U.S. Census data. Historic census data from 1940 and 1960 are included to reflect trends in population increases or decreases. Counties that are part of the Detroit metropolitan area are shaded in tan.

1980 Rank	County	Largest city	1940 Pop.	1950 Pop.	1960 Pop.	Change 1950-60
1	Wayne	Detroit	2,015,623	2,435,235	2,666,297	9.5%
2	Oakland	Pontiac	254,068	396,001	690,259	74.3%
3	Kent	Grand Rapids	246,338	288,292	363,187	26.0%
4	Genesee	Flint	227,944	270,963	374,313	38.1%
5	Macomb	Warren	107,638	184,961	405,804	119.4%
6	Ingham	Lansing	130,616	172,941	211,296	22.2%
7	Saginaw	Saginaw	130,468	153,515	190,752	24.3%
8	Washtenaw	Ann Arbor	80,810	134,606	172,440	28.1%
9	Kalamazoo	Kalamazoo	100,085	126,707	169,712	33.9%
10	Muskegon	Muskegon	94,501	121,545	129,943	6.9%
11	Calhoun	Battle Creek	94,206	120,813	138,858	14.9%
12	Berrien	Benton Harbor	89,117	115,702	149,865	29.5%
13	Jackson	Jackson	93,108	108,168	131,994	22.0%

== Sports ==
=== Baseball ===
- 1958 Detroit Tigers season – Under managers Jack Tighe and Bill Norman, the Tigers compiled a 77–77 record and finished in fifth place in the American League. The team's statistical leaders included Harvey Kuenn with a .319 batting average, Gail Harris with 20 home runs, Al Kaline with 85 RBIs, and Frank Lary with 16 wins and a 2.90 earned run average.
- 1958 Michigan Wolverines baseball team - Under head coach Ray Fisher, the Wolverines compiled an 18–12 record.

=== American football ===
- 1958 Detroit Lions season – The Lions, under head coach George Wilson, compiled a 4–7–1 record. The team's statistical leaders included Tobin Rote with 1,678 passing yards and 351 rushing yards, Dave Middleton with 506 receiving yards, and Jim Martin with 49 points scored.
- 1958 Michigan State Spartans football team – Under head coach Duffy Daugherty, the Spartans compiled a 3–5–1 record. The team's statistical leaders included Mike Panitch with 250 passing yards, Dean Look with 328 rushing yards, and Sam Williams with 242 receiving yards.
- 1958 Michigan Wolverines football team – Under head coach Bennie Oosterbaan, the Wolverines compiled a 2-6-1 record. The team's statistical leaders included Bob Ptacek with 763 passing yards, Darrell Harper with 309 rushing yards and 54 points scored, and Gary Prahst with 313 receiving yards.
- 1958 Eastern Michigan Hurons football team – Under head coach Fred Trosko, the Hurons compiled a 4–5 record.
- 1958 Central Michigan Chippewas football team – Under head coach Kenneth "Bill" Kelly, the Chippewas compiled a 7–3 record.
- 1958 Western Michigan Broncos football team – Under head coach Merle Schlosser, the Broncos compiled a 4–5 record.
- 1958 Detroit Titans football team – The Titans compiled a 4–4–1 record under head coach Wally Fromhart.

=== Basketball ===
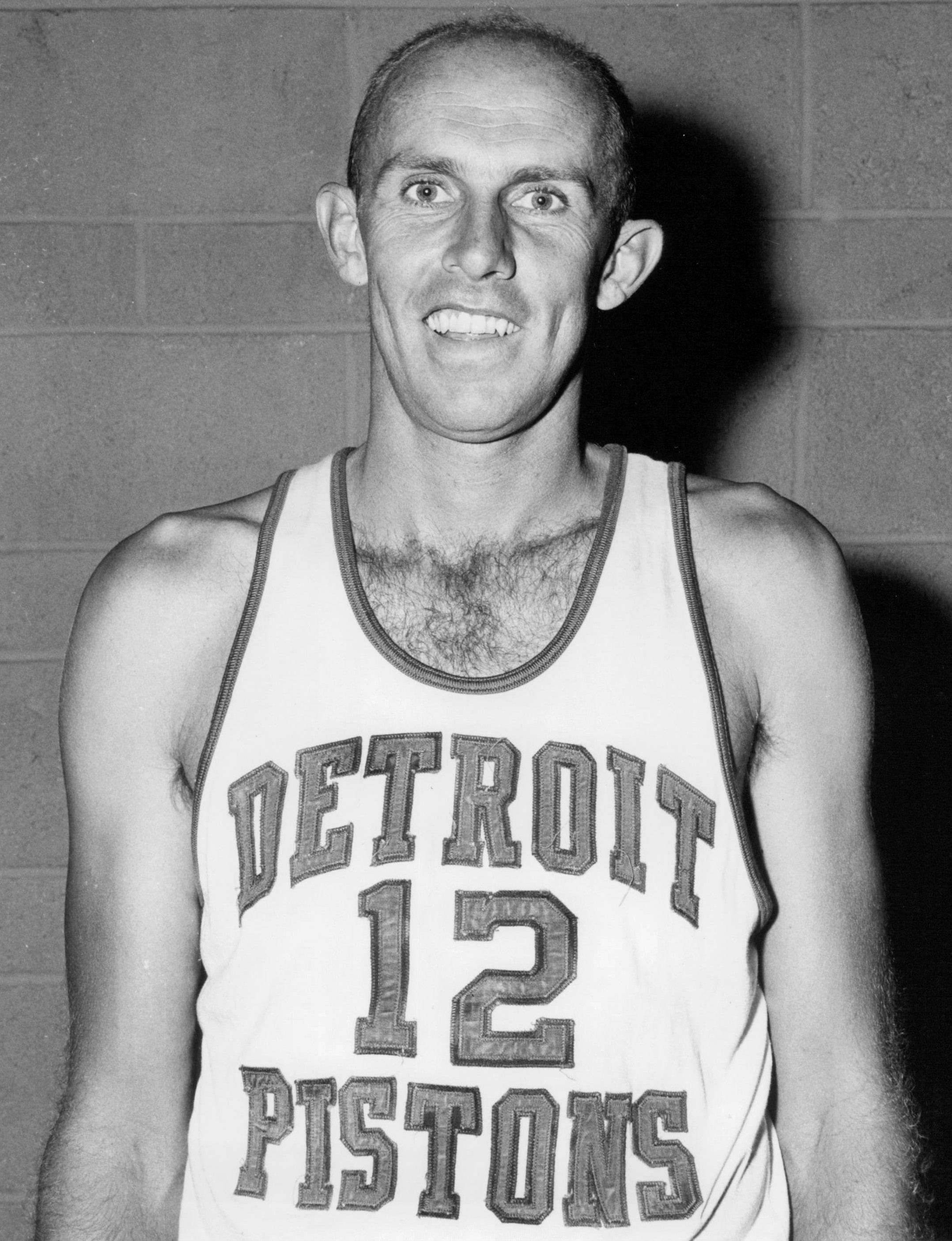
George Yardley

- 1957–58 Detroit Pistons season – In their first season in Detroit, under head coaches Charles Eckman and Red Rocha, the Pistons compiled a 33–39 record and finished in second place in the NBA's Western Division. The team's statistical leaders included George Yardley with 2,001 points, Walter Dukes with 954 rebounds, and Dick McGuire with 454 assists.
- 1957–58 Michigan State Spartans men's basketball team – Under head coach Forddy Anderson, the Spartans compiled a 16–6 record. John Green led the team with an average of 18.0 points per game.
- 1957–58 Michigan Wolverines men's basketball team – Under head coach William Perigo, the Wolverines compiled an 11–11 record. Pete Tillotson was the team's leading scorer with 415 points in 22 games for an average of 18.8 points per game.
- 1957–58 Western Michigan Broncos men's basketball team – Under head coach Joseph Hoy, the Broncos compiled a 5–19 record.
- 1957–58 Detroit Titans men's basketball team – The Titans compiled a 13–12 record under head coach Bob Calihan.

=== Ice hockey ===
- 1957–58 Detroit Red Wings season – Under head coaches Jimmy Skinner and Sid Abel, the Red Wings compiled a 29–29–12 record, finished in third place in the National Hockey League, and lost to the Montreal Canadiens in the first round of the playoffs. Gordie Howe led the team with 33 goals, 44 assists, and 77 points. The team's goaltender was Terry Sawchuk.
- 1957–58 Michigan Wolverines men's ice hockey season – Under head coach Al Renfrew, the Wolverines compiled an 8–13 record.
- 1957–58 Michigan Tech Huskies men's ice hockey team – Under head coach John MacInnes, Michigan Tech compiled an 11–16–1 record.
- 1957–58 Michigan State Spartans men's ice hockey team – Under head coach Amo Bessone, the Spartans compiled a 12–11 record.

=== Boat racing ===
- Port Huron to Mackinac Boat Race –
- APBA Gold Cup – Jack Regas

=== Golf ===
- Michigan Open – John Barnum
- Motor City Open -

== Births ==
- January 8 - Betsy DeVos, businesswoman and current Secretary of Education, in Holland, Michigan
- March 10 - Steve Howe, Major League Baseball pitcher (1980–1996), in Pontiac, Michigan
- March 31 - Danny Bass, Canadian Football League player (1980-1991), in Lansing, Michigan
- June 22 - Bruce Campbell, actor (Evil Dead franchise, The Adventures of Brisco County, Jr., Burn Notice), in Royal Oak, Michigan
- July 15 - Mike Duggan, Mayor of Detroit since 2014, in Detroit
- August 11 - Dan Kildee, U.S. Congressman since 2013, in Flint, Michigan
- August 16 - Madonna, singer and entertainer, in Bay City, Michigan
- August 19 - Rick Snyder, Governor of Michigan (2011–2019), in Battle Creek, Michigan
- August 21 - Gary Hogeboom, NFL quarterback (1980–1990), in Grand Rapids, Michigan
- October 23 - Michael Eric Dyson, sociology professor, author, and radio host, in Detroit
- December 1 - Gary Peters, U.S. Congress (2009-2015), U.S. Senate (2015-present), in Pontiac, Michigan
- December 24 - Gene Sperling, economist who was Director of the National Economic Council and Assistant to the President for Economic Policy under Presidents Bill Clinton and Barack Obama, in Ann Arbor, Michigan

=== Gallery of 1958 births ===
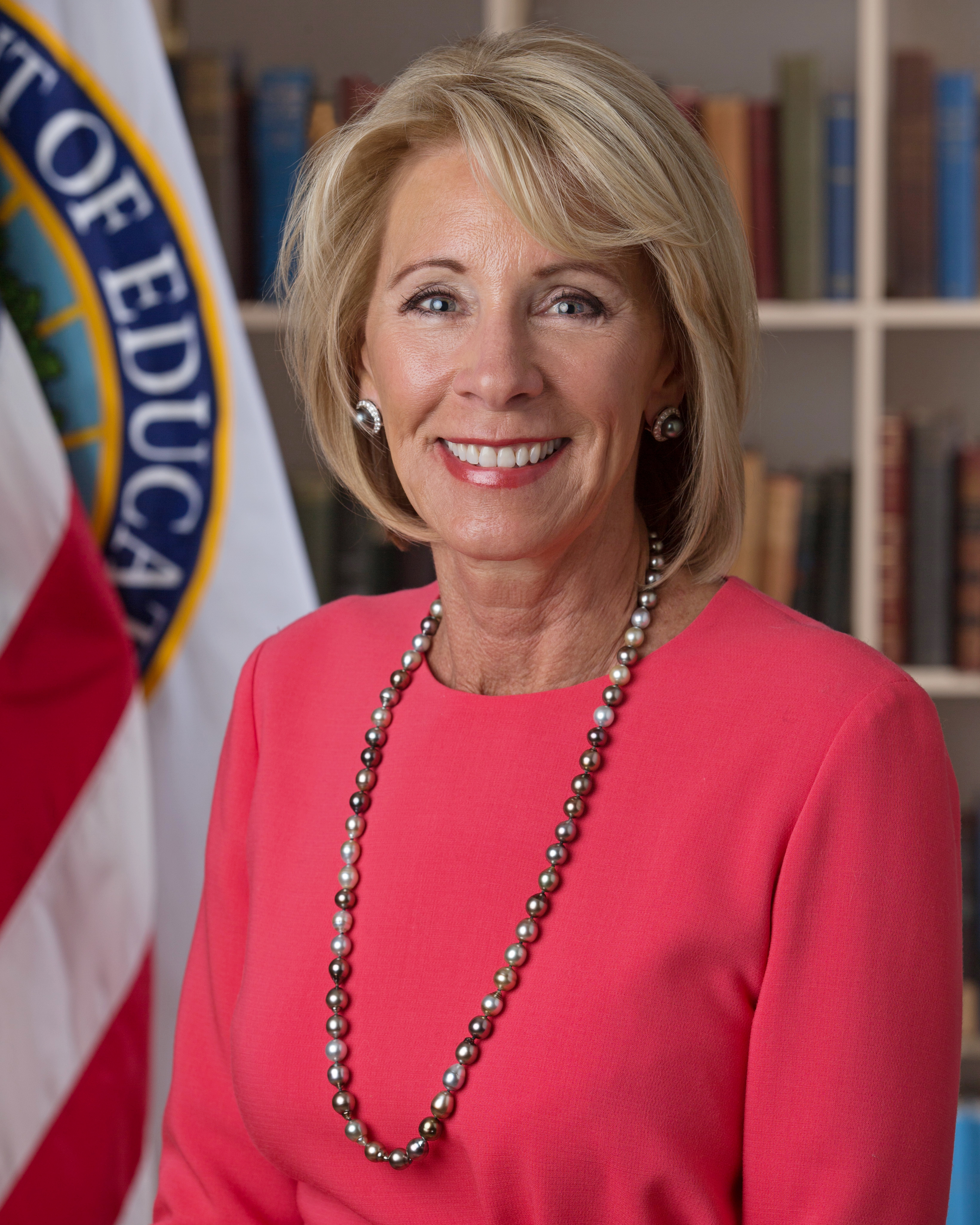
Betsy DeVos

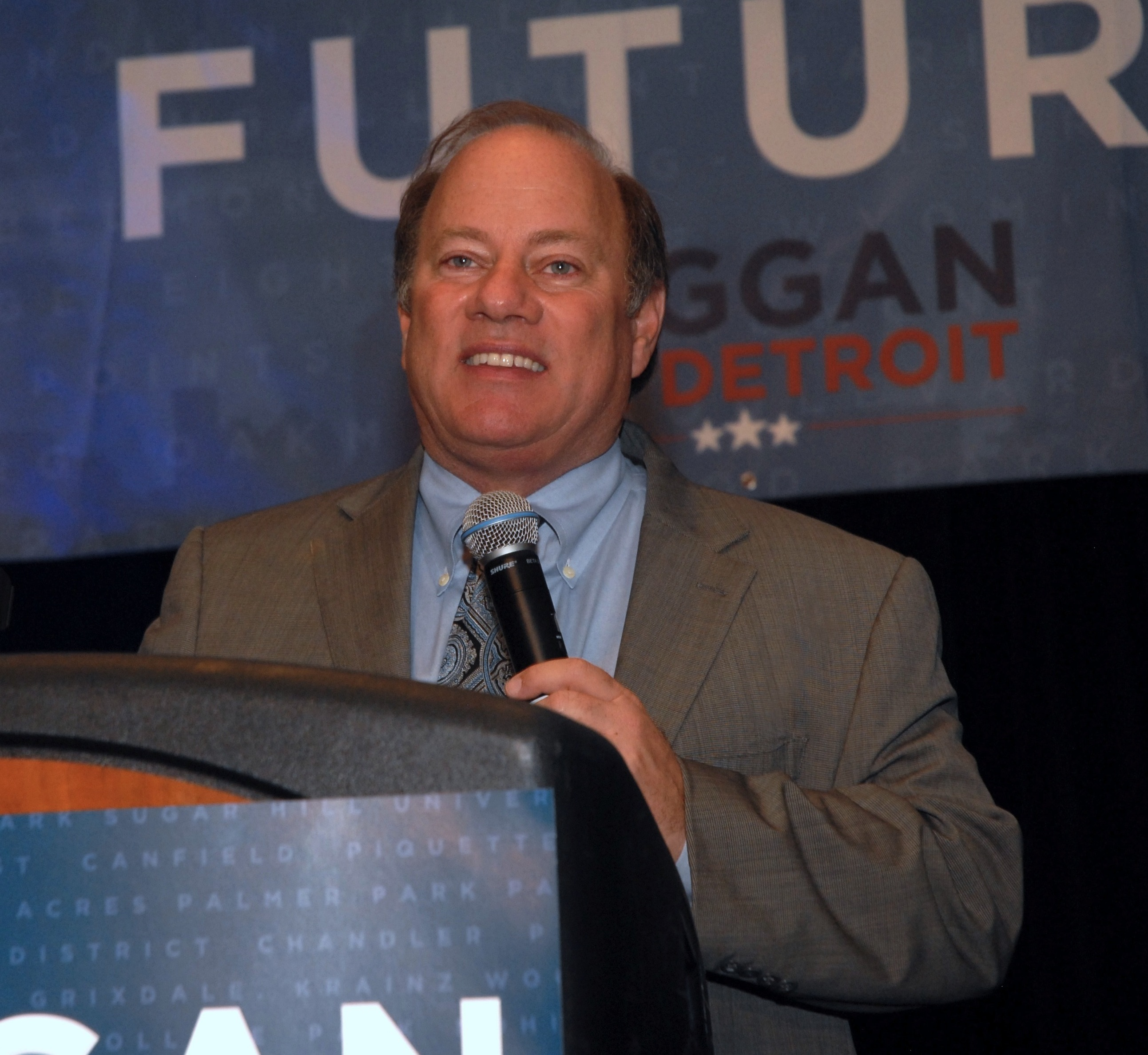
Mike Duggan

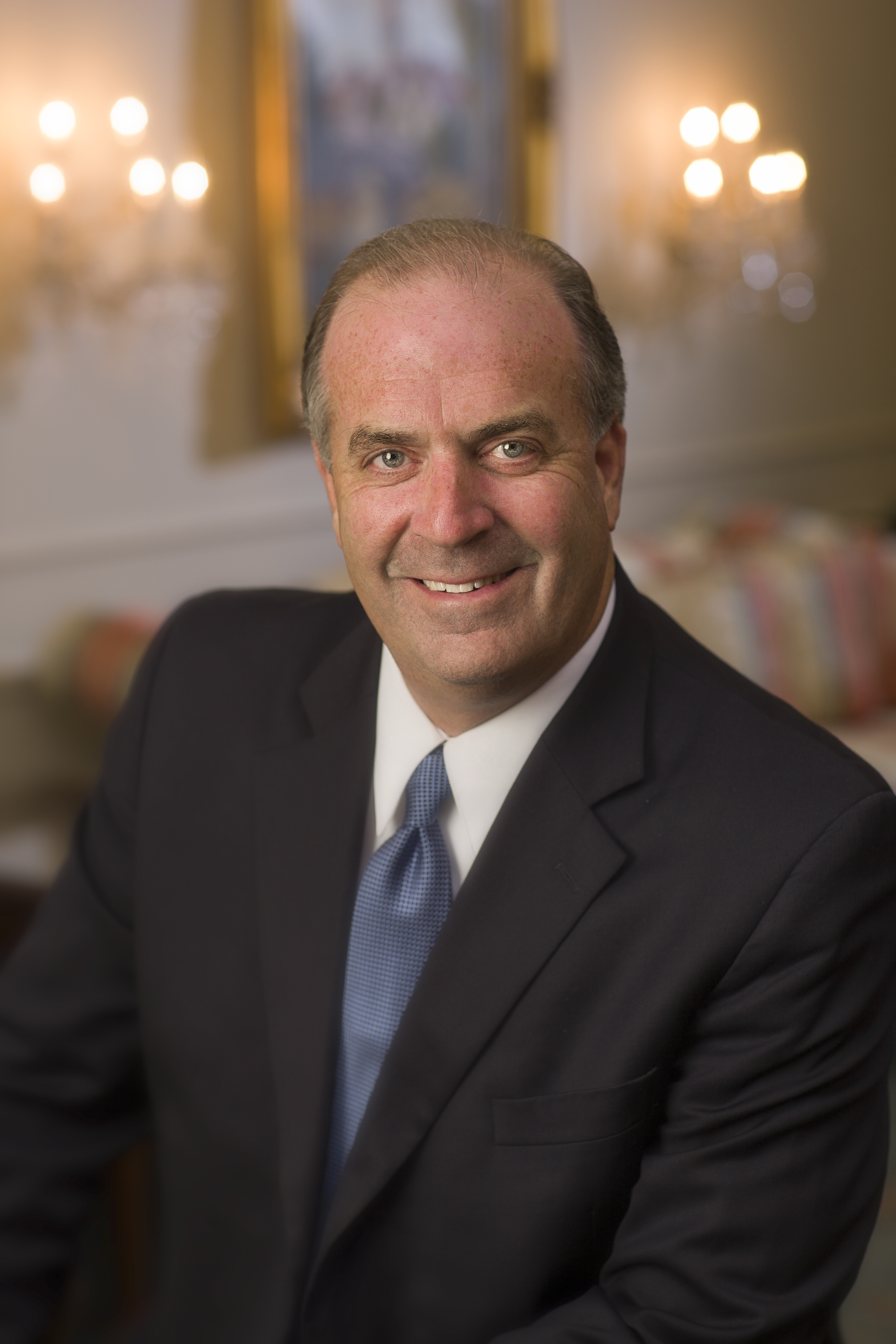
Dan Kildee

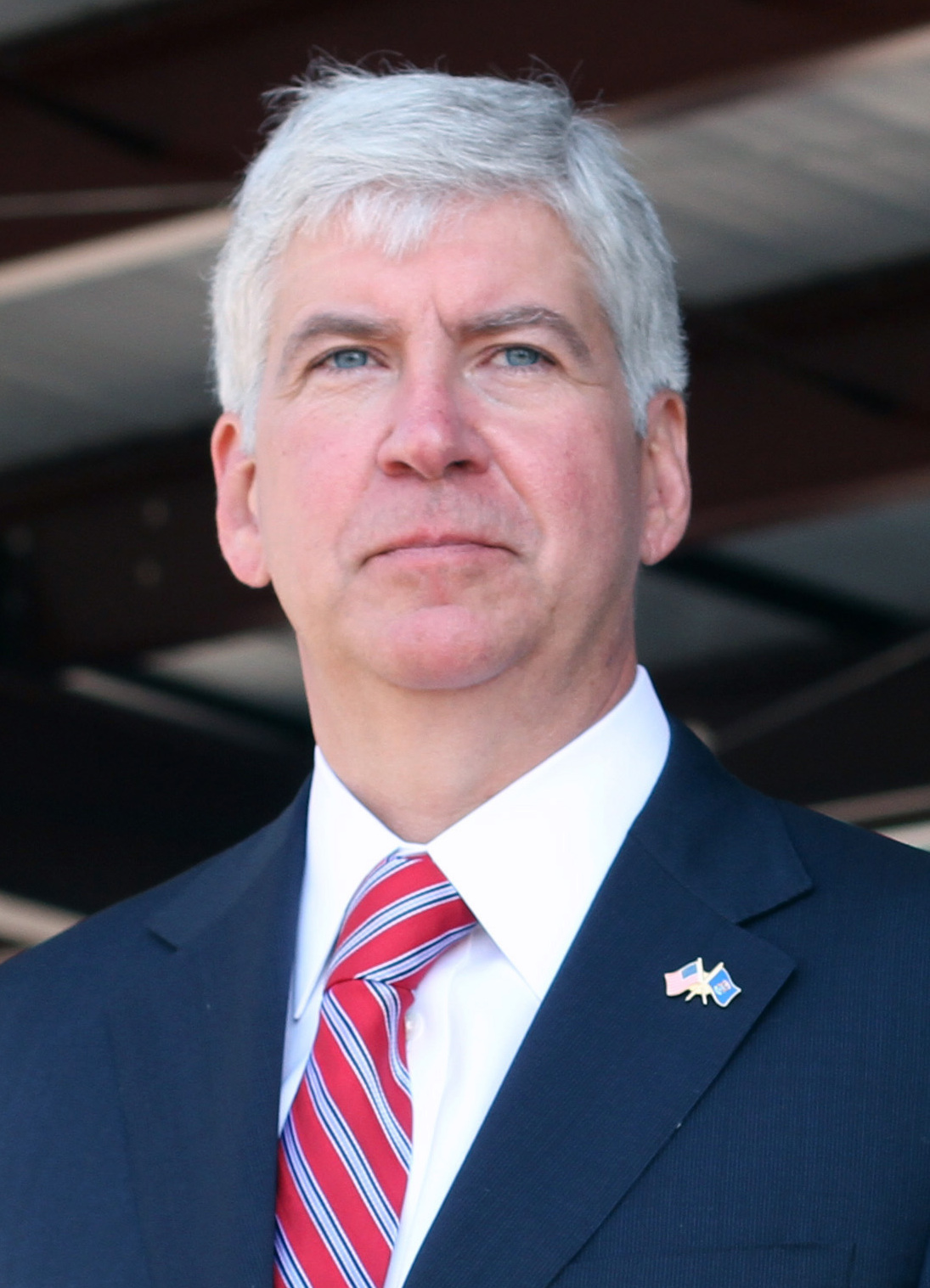
Rick Snyder

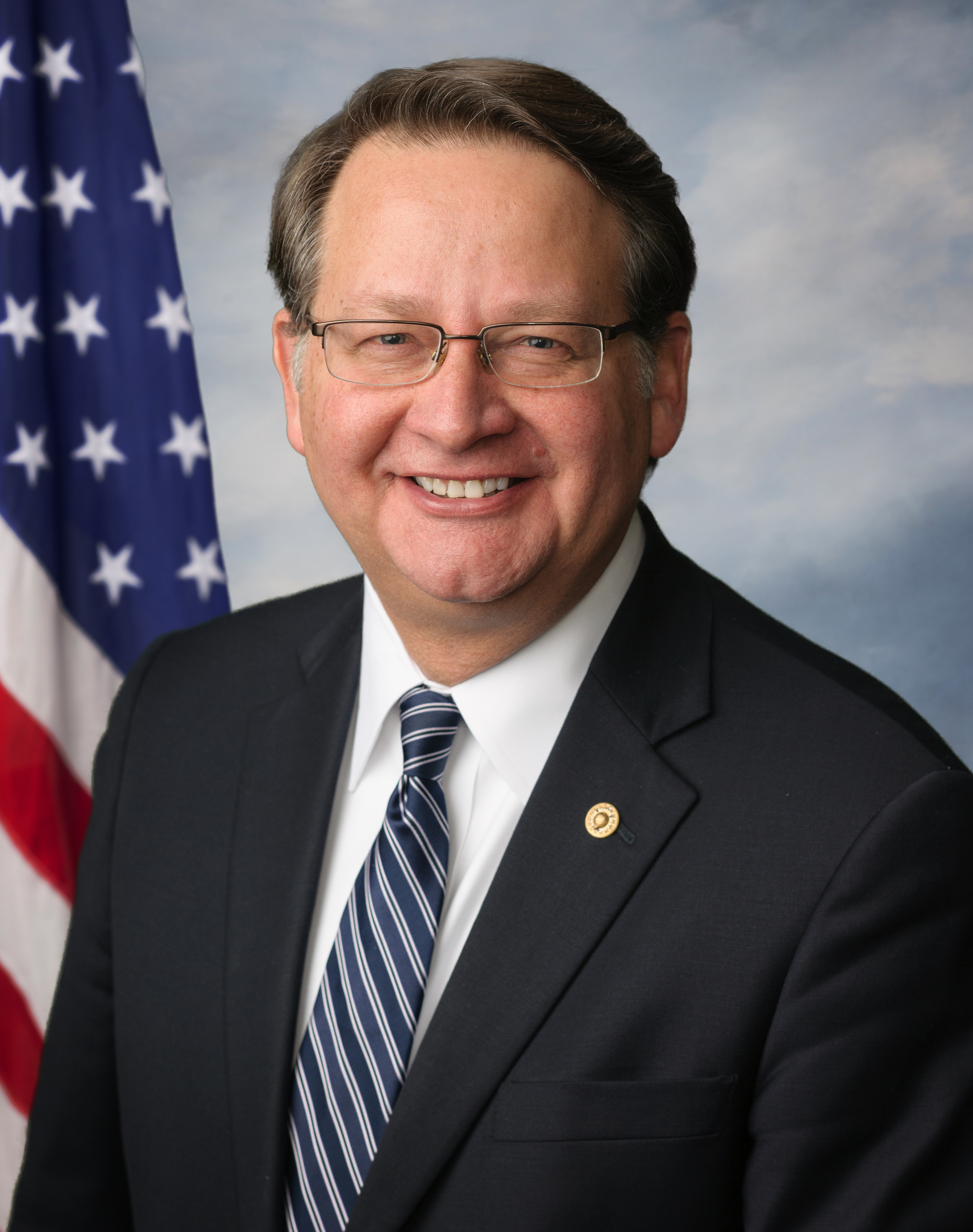
Gary Peters

== Deaths ==
- October 25 - Edward Aloysius Mooney, Roman Catholic Cardinal and Archbishop of Detroit (1937-1958), at age 76 in Rome, Italy
- November - H. G. Salsinger, sports editor of The Detroit News for 49 years, at age 73 in Detroit

=== Gallery of 1958 deaths ===
Edward Aloysius Mooney

== See also ==
- History of Michigan
- History of Detroit
