= 1960 in Michigan =

- Decades: 1940s; 1950s; 1960s; 1970s; 1980s
- See also: History of Michigan; Historical outline of Michigan; List of years in Michigan; 1960 in the United States

Events from the year 1960 in Michigan.

The top stories of the year in Michigan included: (1) the nomination and election of John Swainson, a 35-year-old double amputee, as Governor of Michigan; (2) the decision of G. Mennen Williams not to run for a seventh term as governor; (3) the selection of Michigan's Nancy Fleming as Miss America; (4) John F. Kennedy's taking Michigan's electoral votes over Richard M. Nixon; (5) the selection of Robert McNamara as President of Ford Motor Company and then as Secretary of Defense; and (6) the Detroit Tigers' trade of batting champion Harvey Kuenn to the Cleveland Indians in exchange for Rocky Colavito.

== Office holders ==
=== State office holders ===
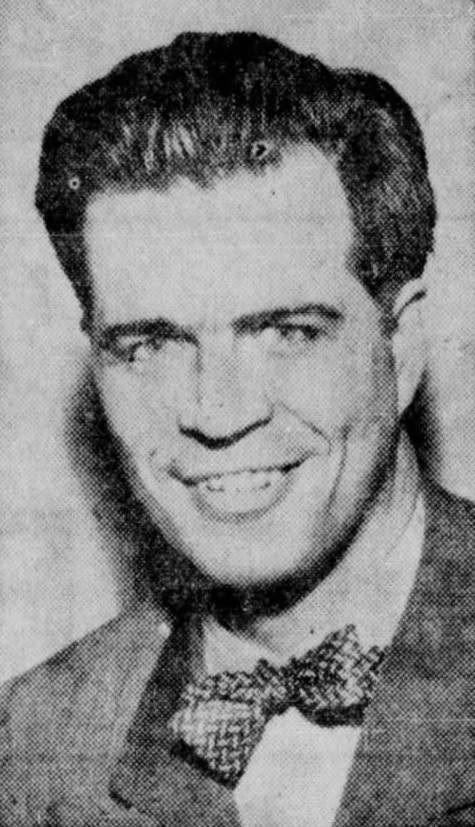
Gov. Williams

- Governor of Michigan: G. Mennen Williams (Democrat)
- Lieutenant Governor of Michigan: John Swainson (Democrat)
- Michigan Attorney General: Paul Adams
- Michigan Secretary of State: James M. Hare (Democrat)
- Speaker of the Michigan House of Representatives: Don R. Pears (Republican)
- Majority Leader of the Michigan Senate: Frank D. Beadle (Republican)
- Chief Justice, Michigan Supreme Court: John R. Dethmers

=== Mayors of major cities ===
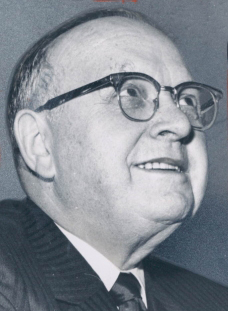
Mayor Miriani

- Mayor of Detroit: Louis Miriani
- Mayor of Grand Rapids: Stanley J. Davis
- Mayor of Warren, Michigan: Ted Bates
- Mayor of Flint: Robert J. Egan/Charles A. Mobley
- Mayor of Saginaw: R. Dewey Stearns
- Mayor of Dearborn: Orville L. Hubbard
- Mayor of Lansing: Ralph Crego
- Mayor of Ann Arbor: Cecil Creal

=== Federal office holders ===
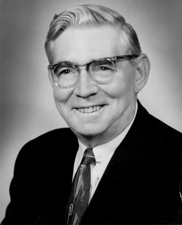
Sen. McNamara

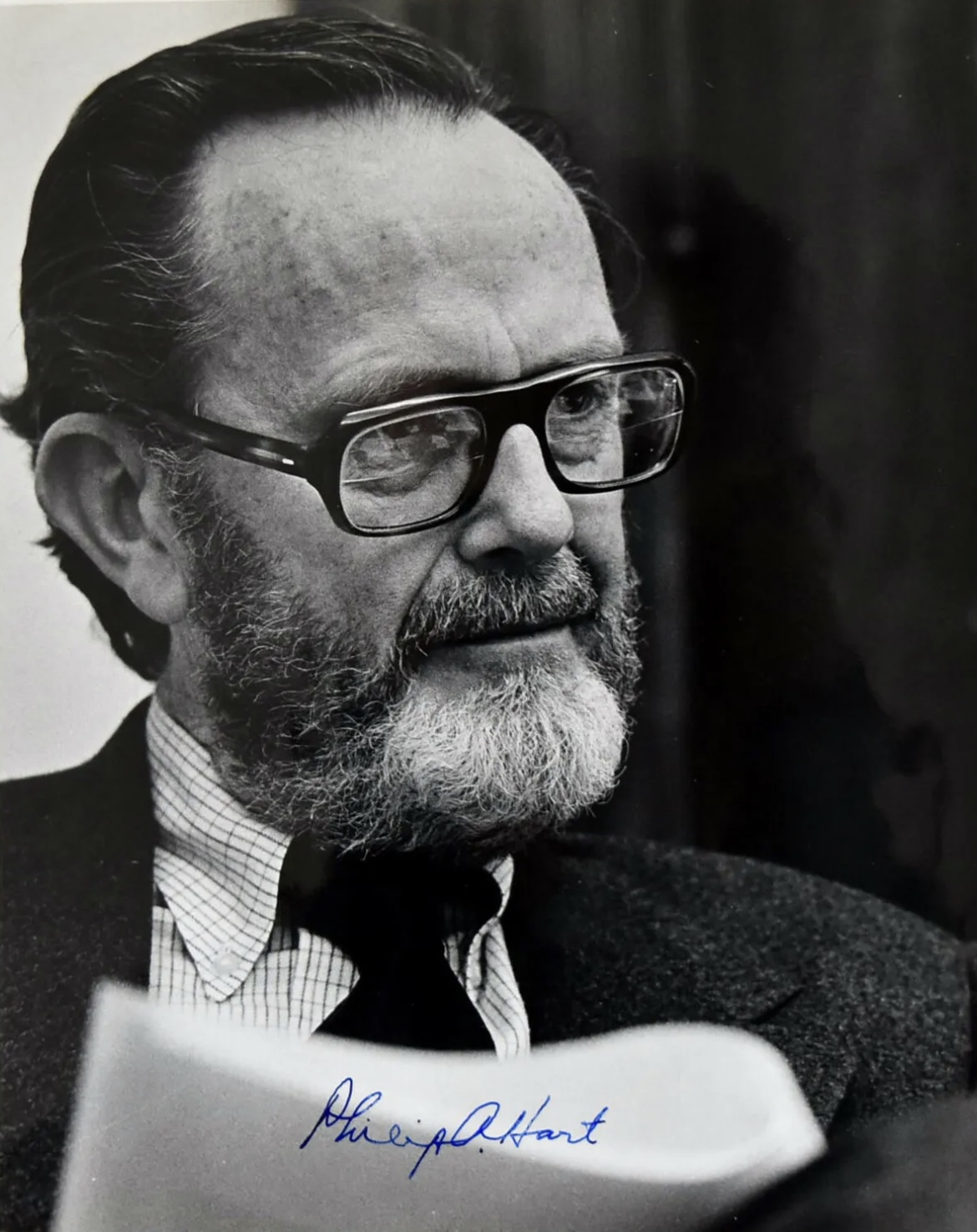
Sen. Hart

- U.S. Senator from Michigan: Patrick V. McNamara (Democrat)
- U.S. Senator from Michigan: Philip Hart (Democrat)
- House District 1: Thaddeus M. Machrowicz (Democrat)
- House District 2: George Meader (Republican)
- House District 3: August E. Johansen (Republican)
- House District 4: Clare Hoffman (Republican)
- House District 5: Gerald Ford (Republican)
- House District 6: Charles E. Chamberlain (Republican)
- House District 7: James G. O'Hara (Democrat)
- House District 8: Alvin Morell Bentley (Republican)
- House District 9: Robert P. Griffin (Republican)
- House District 10: Elford Albin Cederberg (Republican)
- House District 11: Victor A. Knox (Republican)
- House District 12: John B. Bennett (Republican)
- House District 13: Charles Diggs (Democrat)
- House District 14: Louis C. Rabaut (Democrat)
- House District 15: John Dingell Jr. (Democrat)
- House District 16: John Lesinski Jr. (Democrat)
- House District 17: Martha Griffiths (Democrat)
- House District 18: William Broomfield (Republican)

== Population ==
In the 1960 United States census, Michigan was recorded as having a population of 7,823,194 persons, ranking as the seventh most populous state in the country. By 1970, the state's population had grown 13.4% to 8,875,083 persons.

=== Cities ===
The following is a list of cities in Michigan with a population of at least 60,000 based on 1960 U.S. Census data. Historic census data from 1950 and 1970 is included to reflect trends in population increases or decreases. Cities that are part of the Detroit metropolitan area are shaded in tan.

1960 Rank	City	County	1950 Pop.	1960 Pop.	1970 Pop.	Change 1960-70
1	Detroit	Wayne	1,849,568	1,670,144	1,514,063	−9.3% ▼
2	Flint	Genesee	163,143	196,940	193,317	−1.8% ▼
3	Grand Rapids	Kent	176,515	177,313	197,649	11.5% ▲
4	Dearborn	Wayne	94,994	112,007	104,199	−7.0% ▼
5	Lansing	Ingham	92,129	107,807	131,403	21.9% ▲
6	Saginaw	Saginaw	92,918	98,265	91,849	−6.5% ▼
7	Warren	Macomb	42,653	89,246	179,260	100.2% ▲
8	Pontiac	Oakland	73,681	82,233	85,279	3.7% ▲
9	Kalamazoo	Kalamazoo	57,704	82,089	85,555	4.1% ▲
10	Royal Oak	Oakland	46,898	80,612	86,238	7.0% ▲
11	St. Clair Shores	Macomb	19,823	76,657	88,093	14.9% ▲
12	Ann Arbor	Washtenaw	48,251	67,340	100,035	48.6% ▲
13	Livonia	Wayne	17,634	66,702	110,109	65.1% ▲
14	Dearborn Heights	Wayne	20,235	61,118	80,069	31.0% ▲
15	Westland	Wayne	30,407	60,743	86,749	42.8% ▲

=== Counties ===
The following is a list of counties in Michigan with populations of at least 100,000 based on 1960 U.S. Census data. Historic census data from 1950 and 1970 are included to reflect trends in population increases or decreases. Counties that are part of the Detroit metropolitan area are shaded in tan.

1960 Rank	County	Largest city	1950 Pop.	1960 Pop.	1970 Pop.	Change 1960-70
1	Wayne	Detroit	2,435,235	2,666,297	2,666,751	0.0% ▲
2	Oakland	Pontiac	396,001	690,259	907,871	31.5% ▲
3	Macomb	Warren	184,961	405,804	625,309	54.1% ▲
4	Genesee	Flint	270,963	374,313	444,341	18.7% ▲
5	Kent	Grand Rapids	288,292	363,187	411,044	13.2% ▲
6	Ingham	Lansing	172,941	211,296	261,039	23.5% ▲
7	Saginaw	Saginaw	153,515	190,752	219,743	15.2% ▲
8	Washtenaw	Ann Arbor	134,606	172,440	234,103	35.8% ▲
9	Kalamazoo	Kalamazoo	126,707	169,712	201,550	18.8% ▲
10	Berrien	Benton Harbor	115,702	149,865	163,875	9.3% ▲
11	Calhoun	Battle Creek	120,813	138,858	141,963	2.2% ▲
12	Jackson	Jackson	108,168	131,994	143,274	8.5% ▲
13	Muskegon	Muskegon	121,545	129,943	157,426	21.2% ▲
14	St. Clair	Port Huron	91,599	107,201	120,175	12.1% ▲
15	Bay	Bay City	88,461	107,042	117,339	9.6% ▲
16	Monroe	Monroe	75,666	101,120	118,479	17.2% ▲

== Sports ==
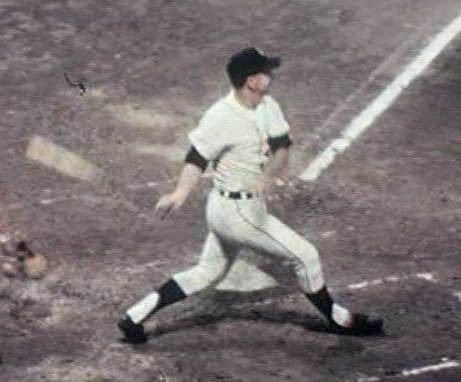
Norm Cash

=== Baseball ===
- 1960 Detroit Tigers season – Under managers Jimmy Dykes and Joe Gordon (the subject of the first managerial trade in major league history on August 3), the Tigers compiled a 71–83 record and finished in sixth place in the American League. The team's statistical leaders included Norm Cash with a .286 batting average, Rocky Colavito with 35 home runs and 87 RBIs (as well as 80 strikeouts), Frank Lary with 15 wins, and Dave Sisler a 2.48 earned run average.
- 1960 Michigan Wolverines baseball team - Under head coach Don Lund, the Wolverines compiled a 19–12–1 record. Bill Roman was the team captain.

=== American football ===
- 1960 Detroit Lions season – The Lions, under head coach George Wilson, compiled a 7–5 record and finished in second place in the NFL's West Division. The team's statistical leaders included Jim Ninowski with 1,599 passing yards, Nick Pietrosante with 872 rushing yards, Gail Cogdill with 642 receiving yards, and Jim Martin with 65 points scored.
- 1960 Michigan State Spartans football team – Under head coach Duffy Daugherty, the Spartans compiled a 6–2–1 record and were ranked No. 15 in the final AP Poll. The team's statistical leaders included Tom Wilson with 761 passing yards, Ron Hatcher with 361 rushing yards, and Herb Adderly with 154 receiving yards.
- 1960 Michigan Wolverines football team – Under head coach Bump Elliott, the Wolverines compiled a 5–4 record. The team's statistical leaders included Dave Glinka with 755 passing yards, Bennie McRae with 342 rushing yards, and Robert Johnson with 230 receiving yards.
- 1960 Detroit Titans football team – Under head coach Jim Miller, the Titans compiled a 7–2 record. Jerry Gross led the team in both passing yards (886) and rushing yards (343).
- 1960 Western Michigan Broncos football team – Under head coach Merle Schlosser, the Broncos compiled a 4–4–1 record.
- 1960 Wayne State Tartars football team – Under head coach Harold D. Willard, the Tartars compiled a 4–3 record.
- 1960 Central Michigan Chippewas football team – Under head coach Kenneth "Bill" Kelly, the Chippewas compiled a 3–5 record.
- 1960 Eastern Michigan Hurons football team – Under head coach Fred Trosko, the Hurons compiled an 0–8–1 record.

=== Basketball ===
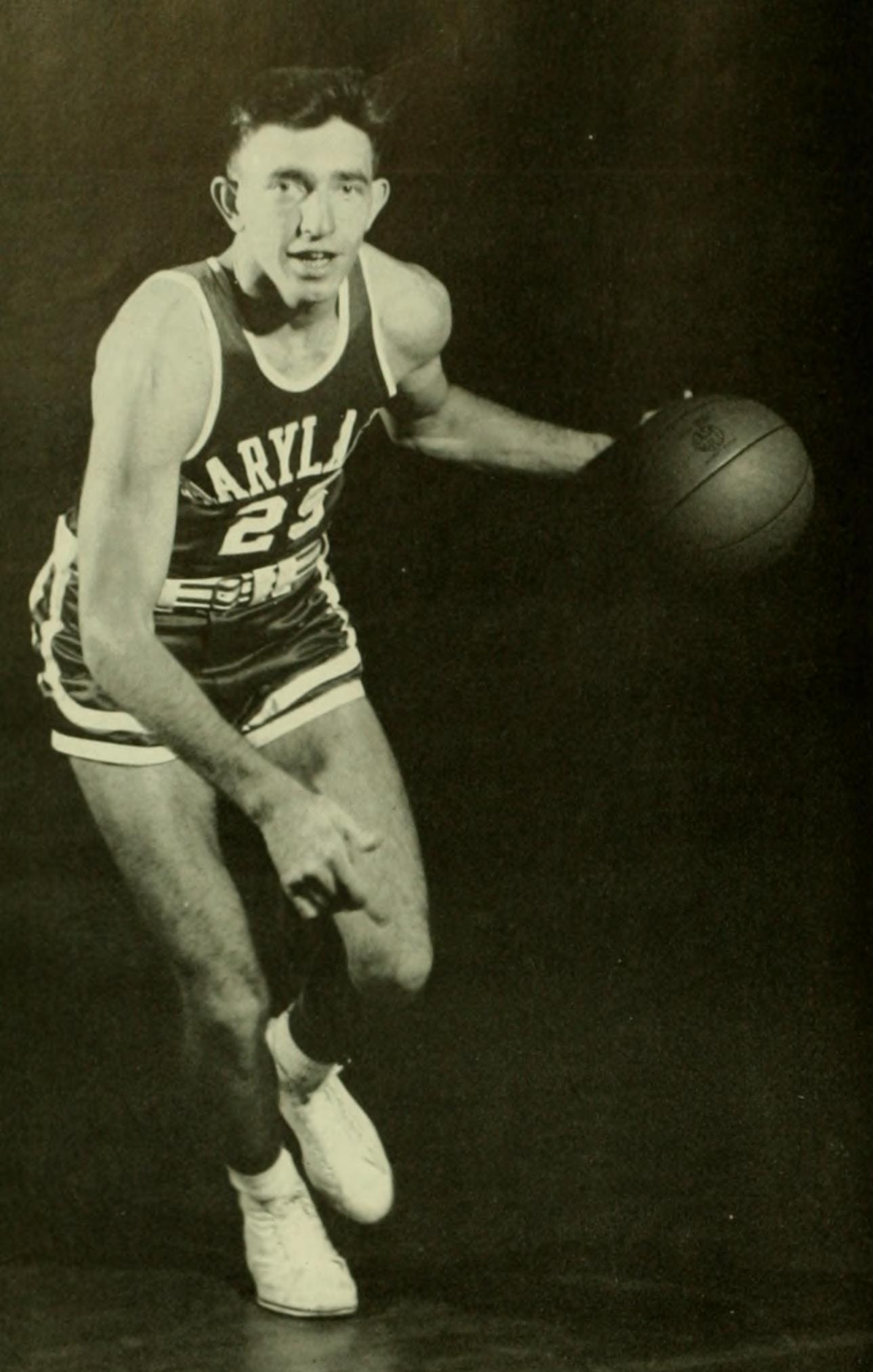
Gene Shue

- 1959–60 Detroit Pistons season – Under head coaches Red Rocha and Dick McGuire, the Pistons compiled a 30–45 record. The team's statistical leaders included Gene Shue with 1,712 points, Walter Dukes with 883 rebounds, and Dick McGuire with 358 assists.
- 1959–60 Detroit Titans men's basketball team – The Titans compiled a 20–7 record under head coach Bob Calihan. Dave DeBusschere led the team with an average of 25.6 points per game.
- 1959–60 Michigan State Spartans men's basketball team – Under head coach Forddy Anderson, the Spartans compiled a 10–11 record. Horace Walker led the team with an average of 22.5 points per game.
- 1959–60 Michigan Wolverines men's basketball team – Under head coach William Perigo, the Wolverines compiled a 4–20 record. John Tidwell led the team with an average of 21.7 points per game.
- 1959–60 Western Michigan Broncos men's basketball team – Under head coach Don Boven, the Broncos compiled a 13–11 record.

=== Ice hockey ===
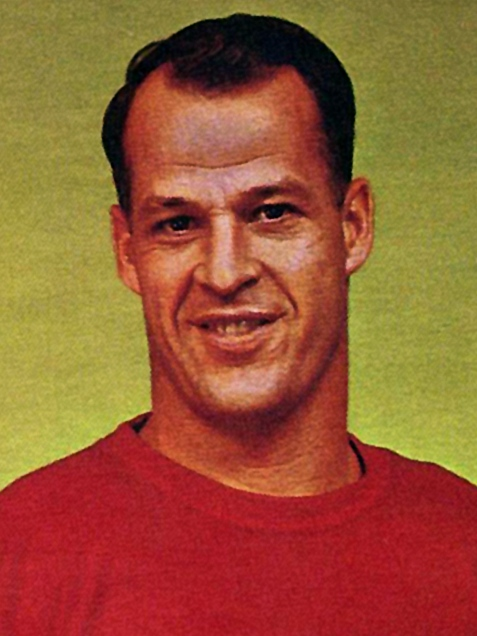
Gordie Howe

- 1959–60 Detroit Red Wings season – Under head coach Sid Abel, the Red Wings compiled a 29–29–15 record and lost to the Toronto Blue Jays in the semi-final round of the playoffs. Gordie Howe led the team with 28 goals, 45 assists, and 73 points. The team's regular goaltender was Terry Sawchuk.
- 1959–60 Michigan Tech Huskies men's ice hockey team – Under head coach John MacInnes, Michigan Tech compiled a 21–10–1 record and placed second at the 1960 NCAA Division I Men's Ice Hockey Tournament, losing to Denver in the championship game.
- 1959–60 Michigan Wolverines men's ice hockey season – Under head coach Al Renfrew, the Wolverines compiled a 12–12 record.
- 1959–60 Michigan State Spartans men's ice hockey team – Under head coach Amo Bessone, the Spartans compiled a 4–18–2 record.

=== 1960 Olympics ===
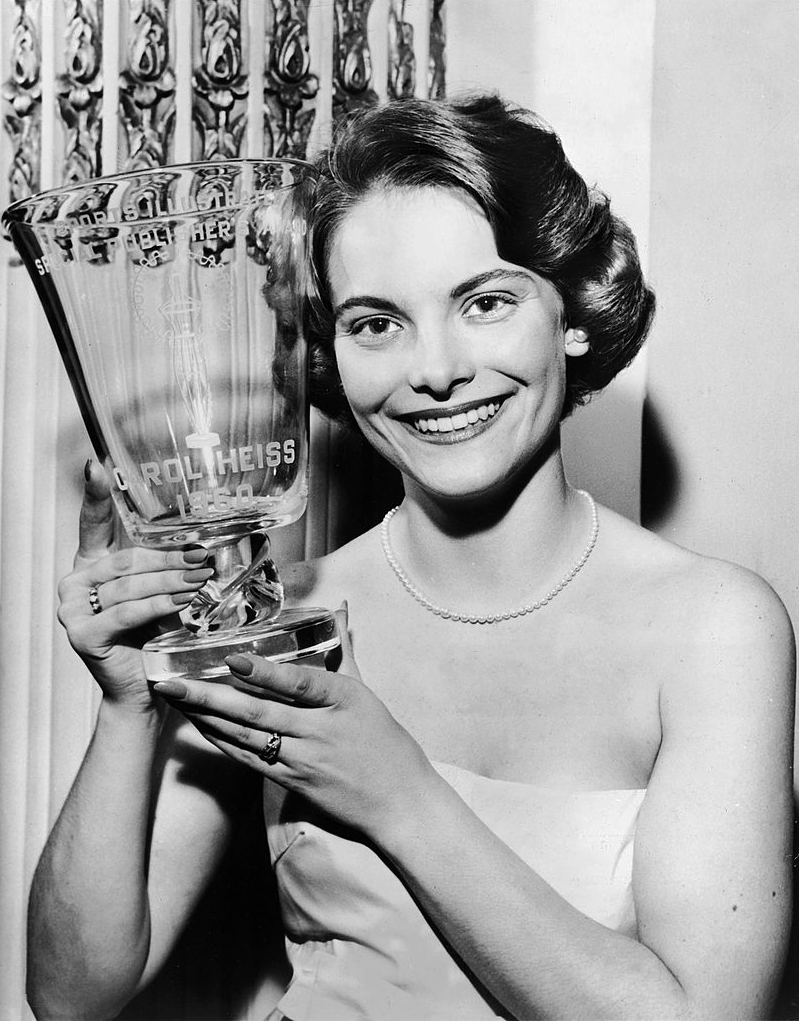
Carol Heiss

The following athletes with ties to Michigan won medals in the 1960 Winter Olympics in Squaw Valley or the 1960 Summer Olympics in Rome:

- Carol Heiss, who trained for four years leading up to the Olympics at Michigan State University, won the gold medal in women's singles figure skating at Squaw Valley in February 1960.
- Betsy Snite, a native of Grand Rapids, won the silver medal in the women's slalom skiing event.
- Eddie Crook Jr. of Detroit won the gold medal in boxing's middleweight class.
- Gary Tobian, a Detroit native, won the gold medal in the men's 3 metre springboard diving event.
- Bob Webster of the University of Michigan won the gold medal in the men's 10 metre platform diving competition.
- Jeff Farrell, a Detroit native, won two gold medals in men's swimming in the 4 × 100 metre medley relay and the 4 × 200 metre freestyle relay.
- Joan Spillane of the University of Michigan won a gold medal in swimming in the 4 × 100 metre freestyle relay.
- Norbert Schemansky of Detroit won the bronze medal in the +90 kg class for weightlifting.
- Dave Gillanders of the University of Michigan won the bronze medal in the men's 200 metre butterfly swimming event.
- Eeles Landström of the University of Michigan won bronze medal in the pole vault.

=== Other ===
- Port Huron to Mackinac Boat Race – The X-Touche owned by Moon Baker and Jerry Clements of Detroit was the overall winner, finishing the race on July 18 in 53 hours, 8 minutes, and 51 seconds and a corrected time of 39 hours, 19 minutes, and 39 seconds.
- Michigan Open – John Barnum of Grand Rapids won the tournament on August 28 at the Lakepointe Country Club in Detroit. It was his third Michigan Open championship.

== Chronology of events ==
=== January ===
- January 10 - McMorran Auditorium was dedicated in Port Huron, Michigan. At the ceremony, architect Alden Dow presented the keys to Wilbur S. Davidson. The auditorium, named after Henry McMorran, was built at a cost of $1.35 million (equivalent to $14,561,815 in 2024). Plans were also announced to build a sports arena just west of the auditorium. Opening night on January 11 featured "An Evening with Victor Borge", comedian-pianist.

=== March ===
- March 3 - G. Mennen Williams announced that he would not run for a seventh term as Governor of Michigan.

=== April ===
- April 12 - The Michigan Legislature passed a bill authorizing the creation of Grand Valley College in Grand Rapids, Michigan.

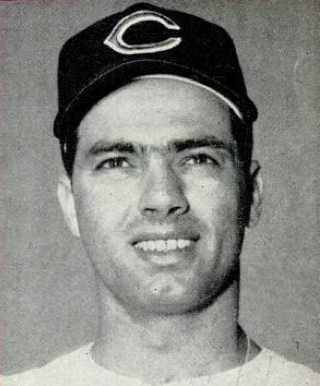
Rocky Colavito

- April 17 - The Detroit Tigers traded Harvey Kuenn, the 1959 American League batting champion, to the Cleveland Indians for Rocky Colavito, who tied for the American League lead with 42 home runs.
- April 28 - William C. Newberg was named President of Chrysler Corporation. Lester L. (Tex) Colbert was promoted to board chairman. Newberg was forced out two months later on June 30 after it was revealed that he had substantial ownership interests in two companies that had supplied parts to Chrysler.

=== May ===
- May 20 - The freighters Standard Portland Cement and the Andrew Ziesing collided in the ship channel in lower Lake Huron two miles north of the Blue Water Bridge. The Standard Portland Cement, loaded with 8,000 tons of taconite, sank in 22 feet of water; all crew members survived.

=== June ===
- June 20 - Residents of Dearborn Heights voted to incorporate as a city.

=== August ===
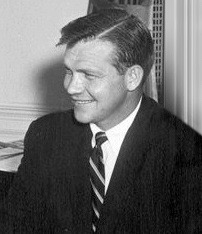
John Swainson

- August 2 - Lt. Gov. John Swainson defeated Attorney General James M. Hare in an upset victory in the primary for the Democratic Party's nomination for governor. Paul D. Bagwell was unopposed for the Republican Party's nomination.
- August 3 - After swapping batting stars in April, the Detroit Tigers and Cleveland Indians swapped managers, Joe Gordon coming to Detroit and Jimmy Dykes going to Cleveland. The deal was the first trade of managers in major league history.

=== September ===
- September 11 - Nancy Fleming of Montague, Michigan, was named Miss America for 1961 in Atlantic City, New Jersey.

=== October ===
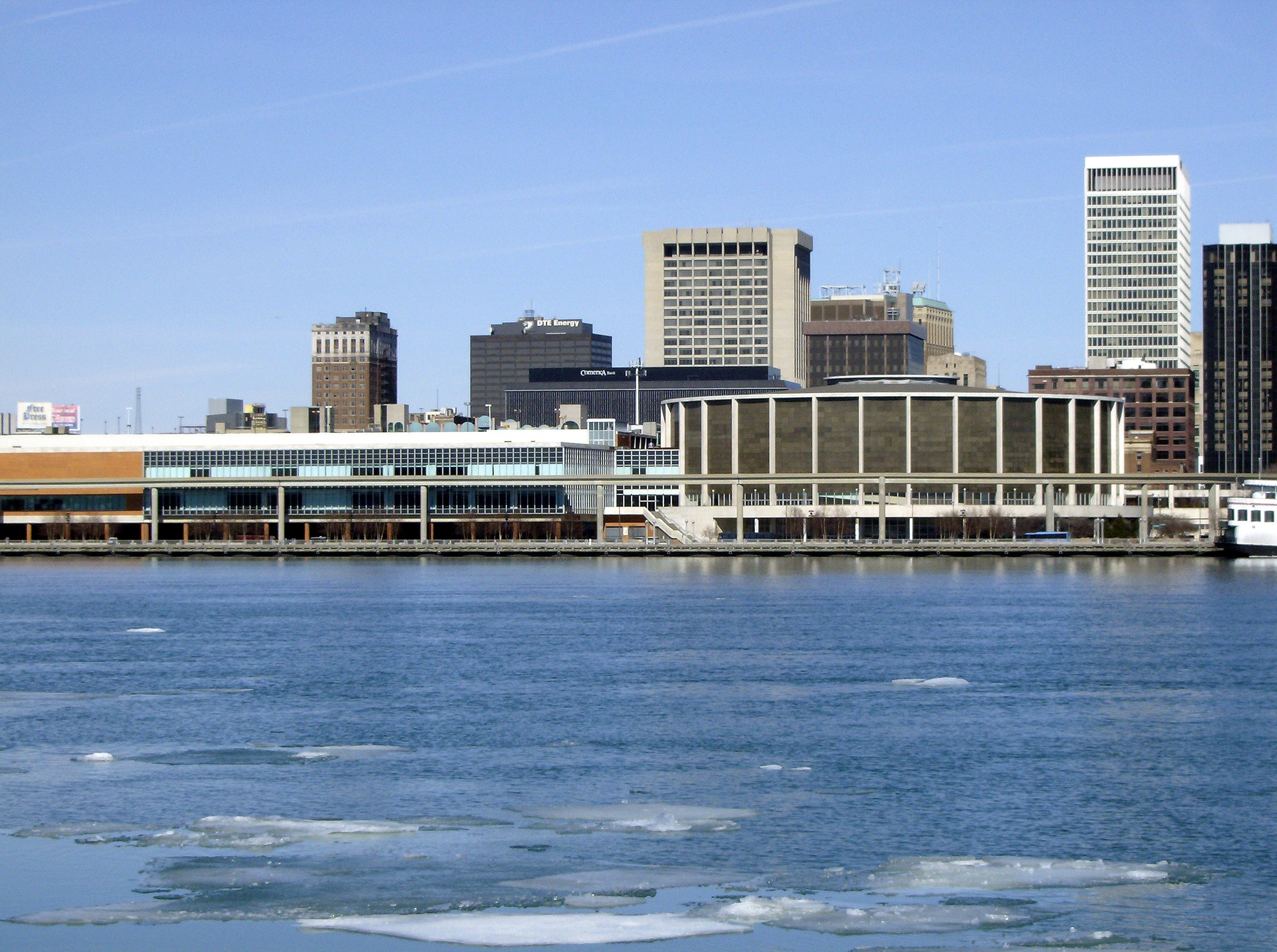
Cobo Hall

- October 11 - John Fetzer bought out five other owners of the Detroit Tigers to become the club's controlling owner.
- October 13 - Cobo Hall, a convention center built at a cost of $54 million (equivalent to $582,472,603 in 2024) on the riverfront in Detroit, was dedicated before a crowd of 3,000 persons. The Detroit Free Press called it "a huge triumph of civic purpose."
- October 15–23 - The National Auto Show was held at Cobo Hall, the first time it was held in Detroit.
- October 21 - L. C. Walker Arena opened in Muskegon, Michigan. Opening night featured a hockey game in which the Muskegon Zephyrs lost to Toledo; attendance was approximately 2,000, far below the capacity of 6,000 persons. Vice President Richard M. Nixon appeared at the dedication ceremony on October 24.

=== November ===
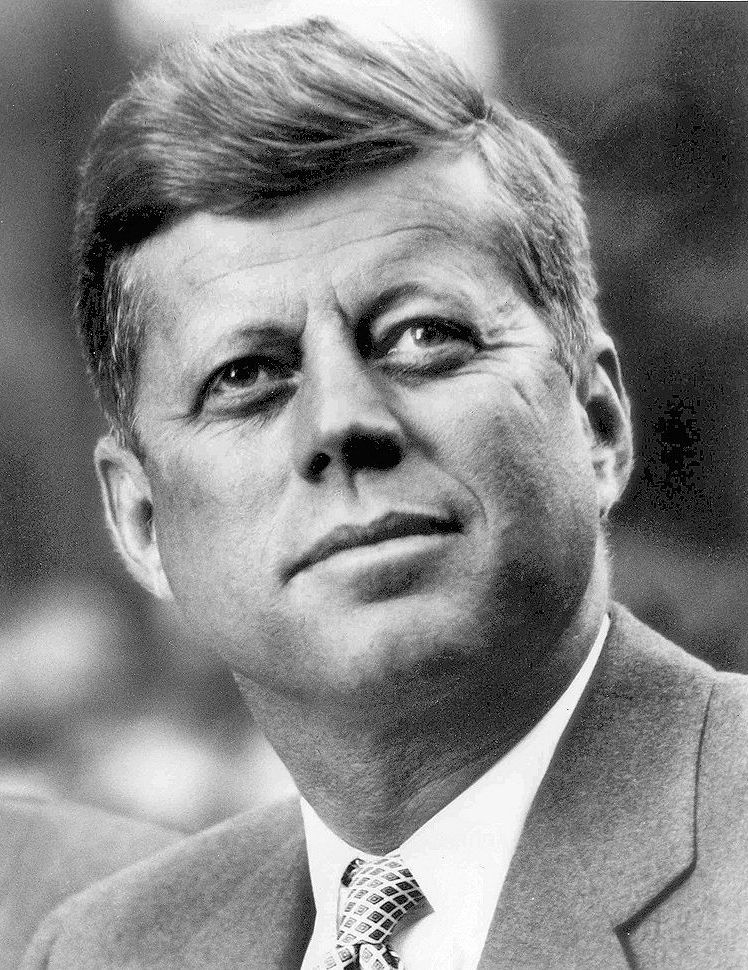
John F. Kennedy

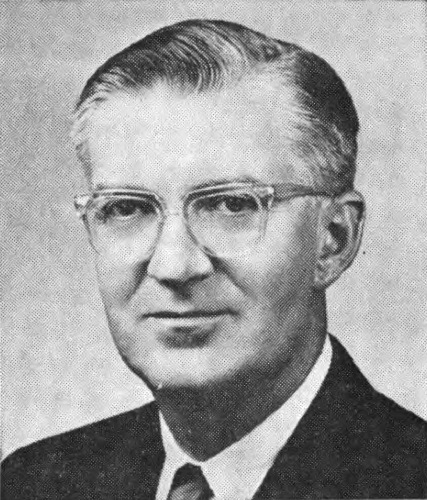
R. James Harvey

- November 6 - The Detroit Times published its final issue after 60 years.
- November 8

- In the United States presidential election in Michigan, Democrat John F. Kennedy won the state's 20 electoral votes with 1,687,269 votes (50.85%) to 1,620,428 (48.84%) for Richard M. Nixon.
- In the U.S. Senate election, incumbent Democrat Patrick V. McNamara defeated Republican challenger Alvin Morell Bentley by a margin of 1,662,255 to 1,543,899.
- In the Michigan gubernatorial election, Democrat John Swainson, a 35-year-old veteran who lost both legs in World War II, defeated Republican Paul D. Bagwell by a margin of 40,000 votes out of 3.2 million ballots cast.
- In other statewide contests, T. John Lesinski defeated Clarence A. Reid for Lieutenant Governor, James M. Hare defeated William E. Kreger for Michigan Secretary of State, and Paul L. Adams defeated Wendell Alverson Miles for Michigan Attorney General.
- In U.S. House of Representatives elections, incumbents were re-elected in 17 of 18 districts. In District 8, Republican R. James Harvey was elected, replacing Alvin Morell Bentley who left the seat to run for the U.S. Senate.
- Michigan voters also approved ballot measures calling for a Constitutional Convention and raising the state sales tax to four percent. The latter proposal passed by a margin of 25,000 votes (0.1%) out of nearly 2.5 million votes cast.

- November 9 - Robert McNamara, at age 44, was named President of Ford Motor Company.
- November 30 - The Francisco Morazan, a Liberian freighter, ran aground off South Manitou Island in Lake Michigan. The ship was caught in a storm with 52-mile-per-hour winds and high swells. The pregnant wife of the captain was evacuated from the ship on December 1. The 14 remaining crew members were taken from the ship on December 5 as weather worsened and the ship's hull ruptured.

=== December ===
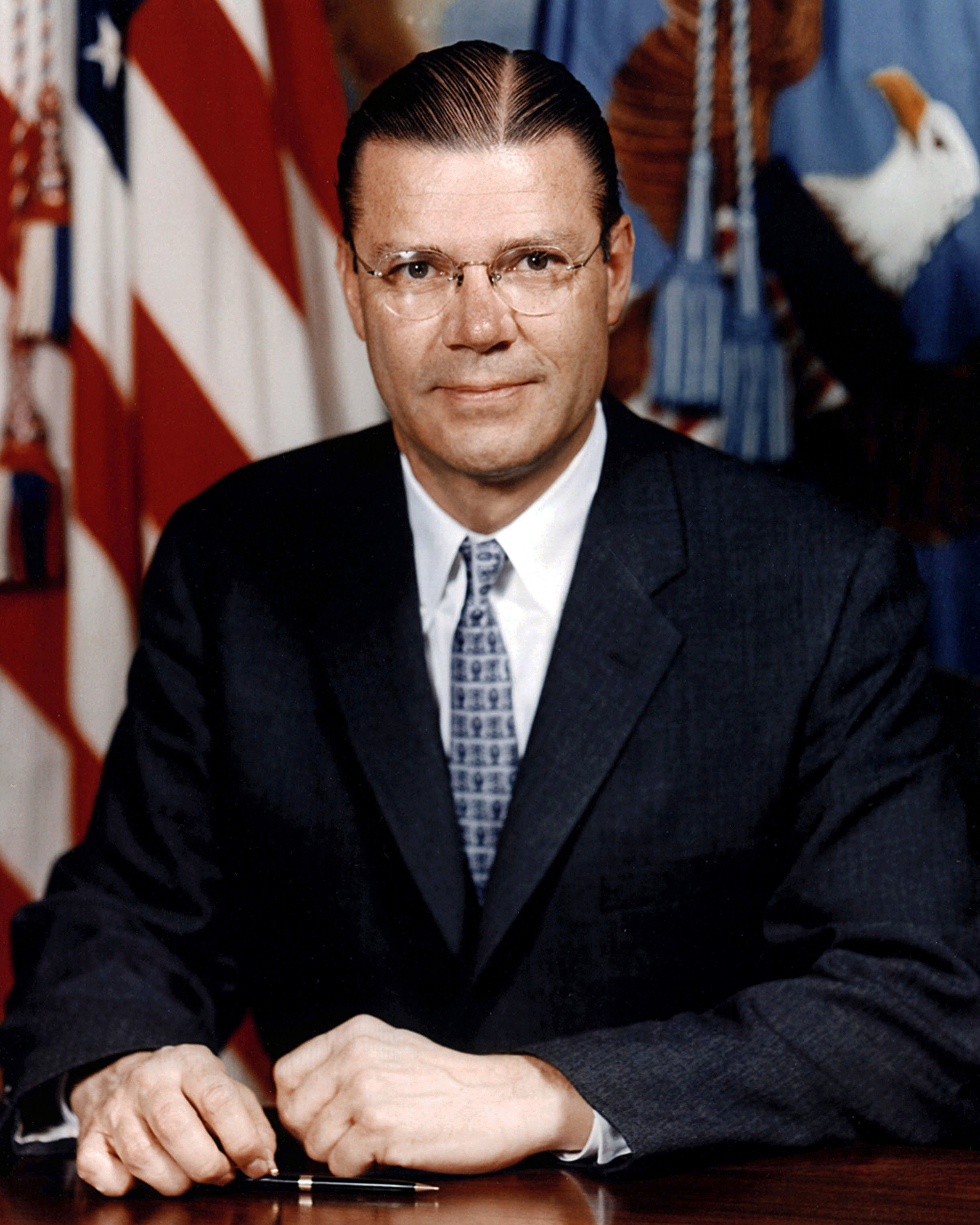
Robert McNamara

- December 1 - President Elect John F. Kennedy nominated G. Mennen Williams as Assistant Secretary of State for African Affairs.
- December 13 - President Elect Kennedy nominated Robert McNamara as United States Secretary of Defense. McNamara had been named President of Ford Motor Company one month earlier.

== Births ==
- January 13 - Eric Betzig, physicist who won Nobel Prize for the development of super-resolved fluorescence microscopy, in Ann Arbor, Michigan
- January 26 - Carol Yager, the heaviest woman ever recorded (peak weight estimated at 1,600 pounds), in Flint, Michigan
- March 8 - Jeffrey Eugenides, Pulitzer Prize-winning novelist (The Virgin Suicides, Middlesex) and short story writer, in Detroit
- April 16 - Curt Young, Major League Baseball pitcher (1983–1993), in Saginaw, Michigan
- May 24 - Pete Metzelaars, NFL tight end (1982–1997), in Three Rivers, Michigan
- June 7 - Jim Paciorek, professional baseball player, mostly in Japan (1987–1993), in Detroit
- June 7 - Bill Prady, television and producer (co-creator of The Big Bang Theory and The Muppets), in Detroit
- October 10 - Charles R. Perricone, 67th speaker of the Michigan House of Representatives (1999-2000)
- October 16 - Dave Trott, U.S. Congressman starting in 2015, in Birmingham, Michigan
- November 3 - Karch Kiraly, volleyball player and 3x Olympic gold medalist, in Jackson, Michigan
- November 7 - Penny Neer, collegiate and Olympic athlete in discus throwing, basketball and softball, in Hillsdale, Michigan
- November 25 - Ray Bentley, USFL/NFL linebacker (1983–1992), in Grand Rapids, Michigan
- December 10 - Paul Assenmacher, Major League Baseball pitcher (1986–1999), in Detroit

=== Gallery of 1960 births ===
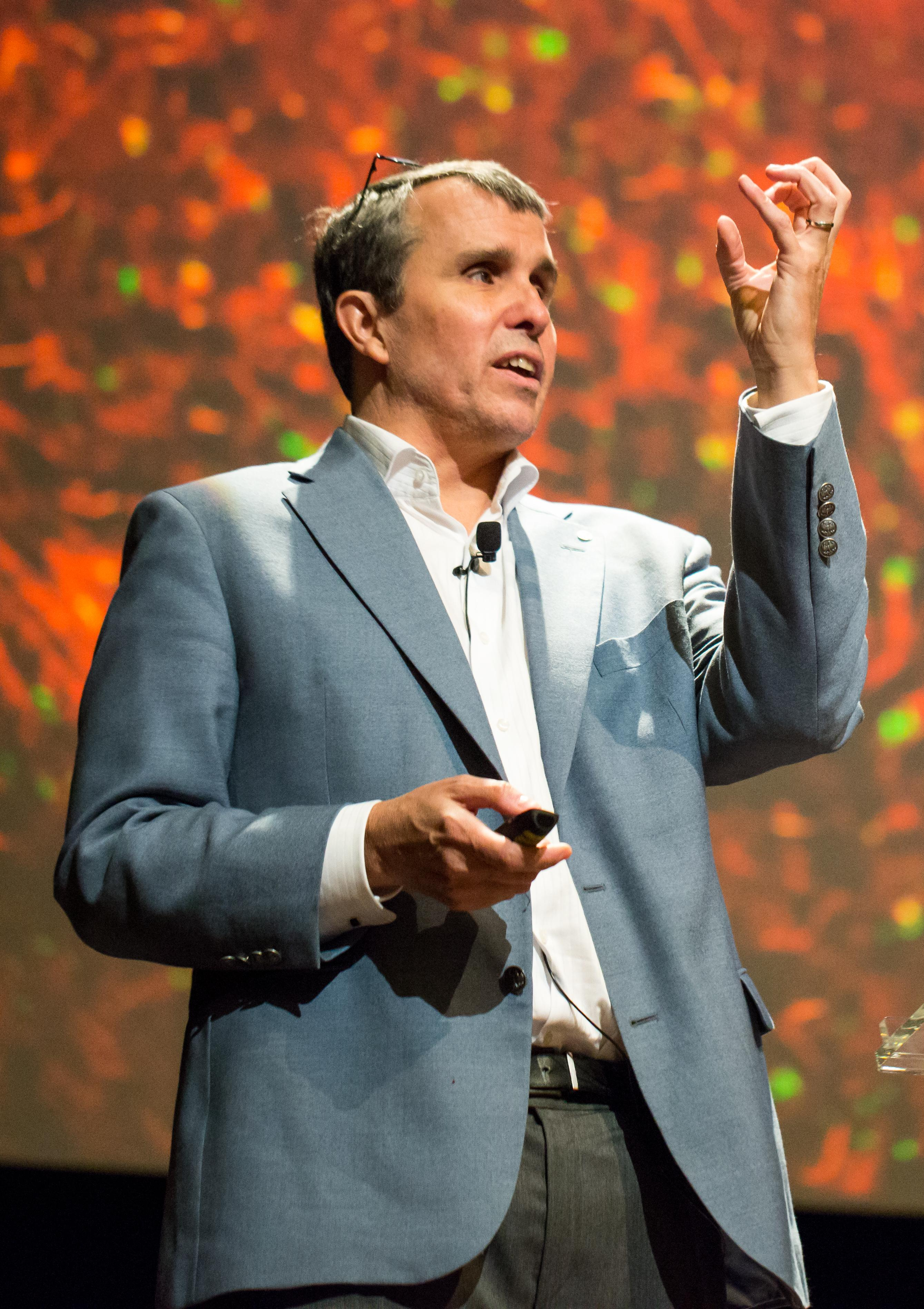
Eric Betzig

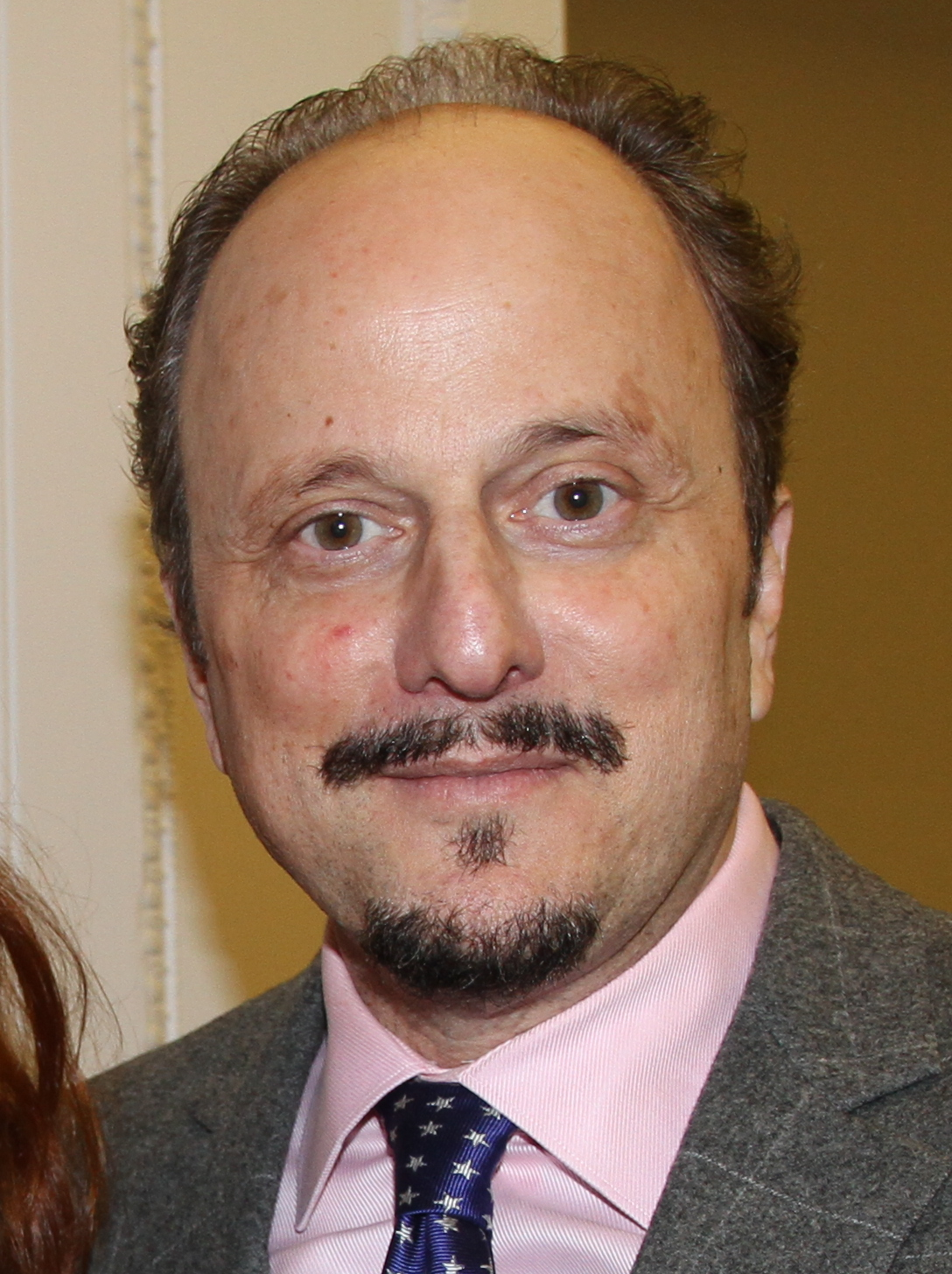
Jeffrey Eugenides

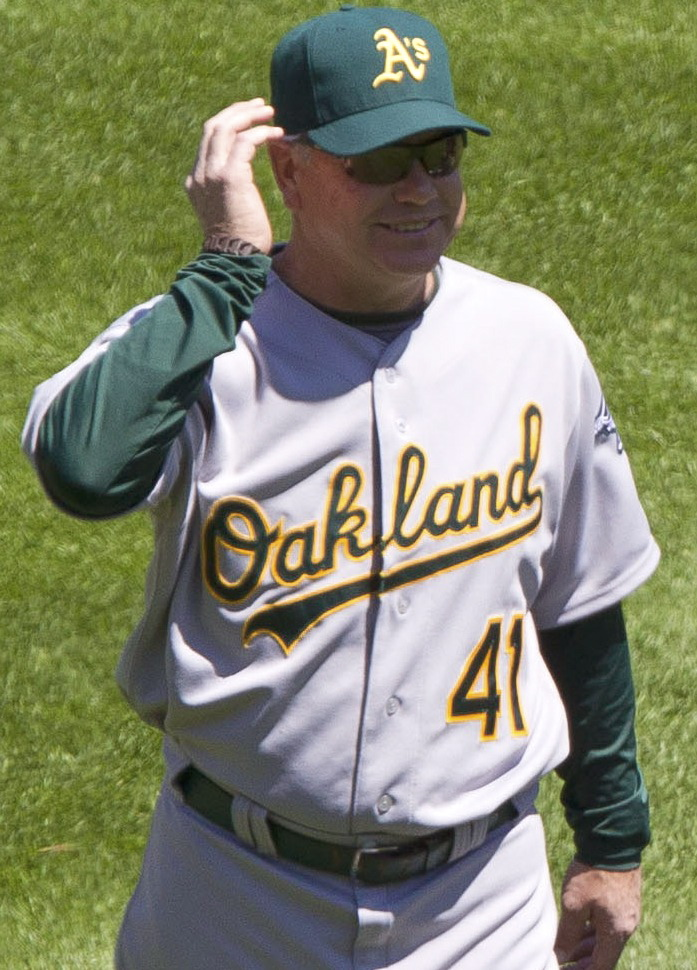
Curt Young

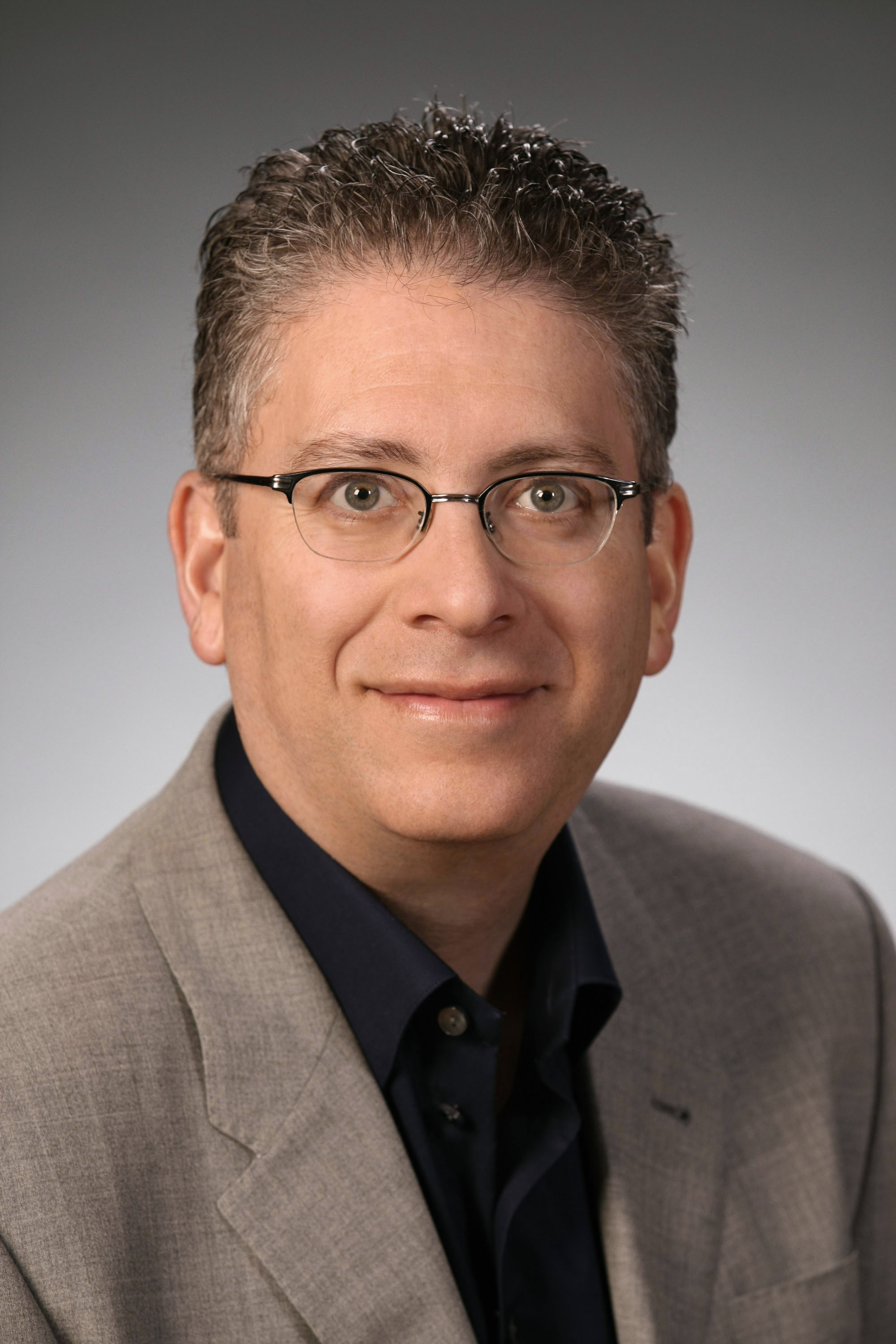
Bill Prady

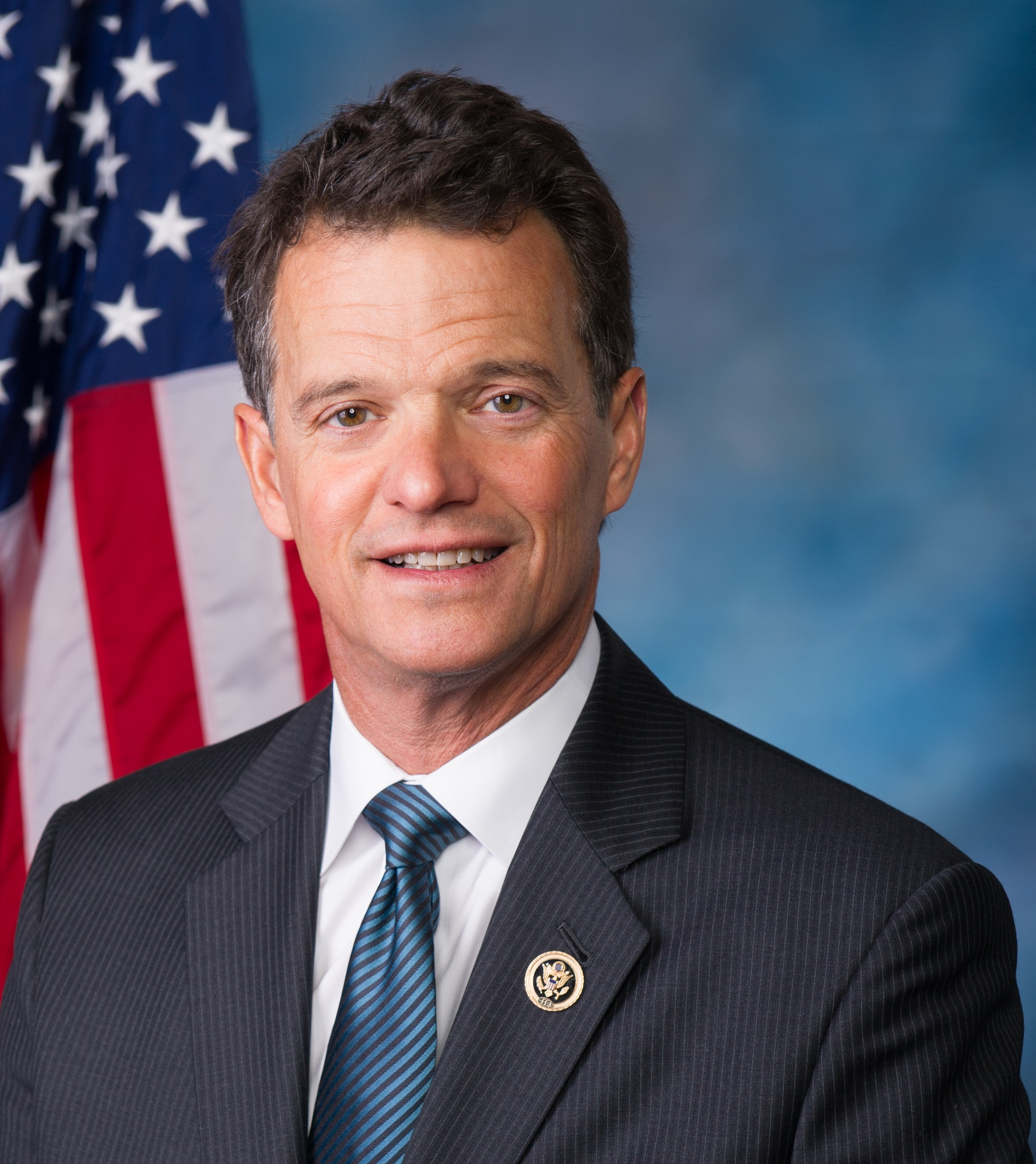
Dave Trott

== Deaths ==
- January 7 - Frank E. Gorman, Michigan State Treasurer (1919–1924), at age 85 in Lansing, Michigan
- May 2 - Caryl Chessman, convicted robber, kidnapper, and rapist, and native of St. Joseph, Michigan, at age 38 in the gas chamber at San Quentin, California
- June 9 - Harry S. Hammond, one of the leading scorers on Michigan's 1904 and 1905 "Point-a-Minute" football teams, at age 75 in Westport, Connecticut
- August 9 - Adam Brown, left wing for Detroit Red Wings (1941-1947), at age 40 at Hamilton, Ontario
- September 13 - Paul Weatherwax, Academy Award-winning film editor (The Naked City, Around the World in 80 Days) and native of Sturgis, Michigan, at age 60 in West Hollywood, California
- November 5 - Miller Pontius, All-American football player at Michigan in 1913, at age 69 in New York City
- December 26 - Fred Knorr, radio executive and part owner of the Detroit Tigers since 1956, at age 47 as a result of burns suffered on December 9 in Fort Lauderdale, Florida
- December 31 - Roy A. Young, chairman of the Federal Reserve Board (1927-1930) and native of Marquette, Michigan, at age 78 in Chestnut Hill, Massachusetts

=== Gallery of 1960 deaths ===
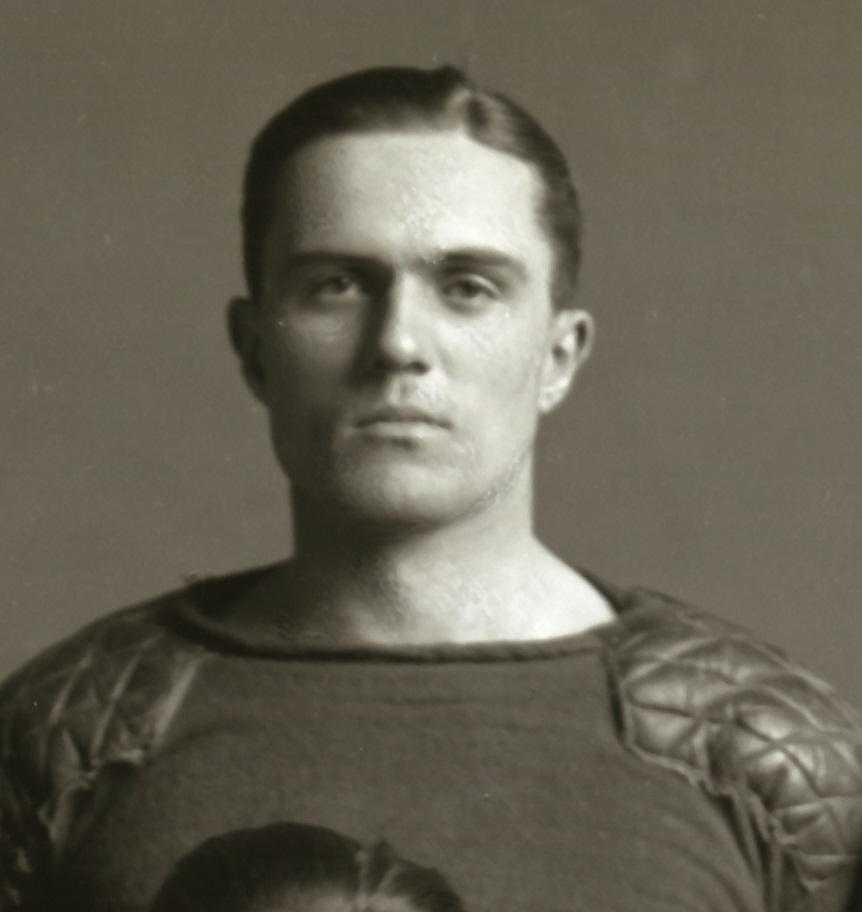
Miller Pontius

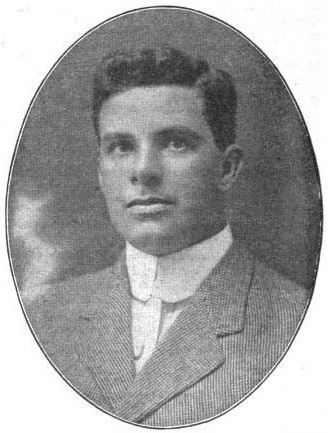
Roy A. Young

== See also ==
- History of Michigan
- History of Detroit
