= Louis Miriani =

American politician

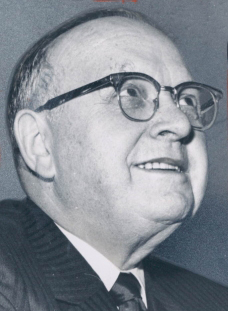

63rd Mayor of Detroit
- In office September 12, 1957 – January 2, 1962
- Preceded by: Albert E. Cobo
- Succeeded by: Jerome Cavanagh

Personal details
- Born: January 1, 1897 Detroit, Michigan, U.S.
- Died: October 18, 1987 (aged 90) Pontiac, Michigan, U.S.
- Party: Republican
- Spouse: Vera M. Miriani
- Children: 2
- Education: University of Detroit
- Profession: Lawyer, Politician

Louis C. Miriani (January 1, 1897 – October 18, 1987) was an American politician who served as the mayor of Detroit, Michigan, from 1957 to 1962. To date, he remains the most recent Republican to serve as Detroit's mayor.

== Biography ==
Miriani graduated from the University of Detroit Law School. He was chief counsel and later director of the Detroit Legal Aid Bureau. He was elected to the Detroit City Council in 1947, and was council president from 1949 to 1957. He became Mayor in 1957 after the death of Albert Cobo, and was elected in his own right shortly afterward by a 6:1 margin over his opponent. Miriani was best known for completing many of the large-scale urban renewal projects initiated by the Cobo administration, and largely financed by federal money. Miriani also took strong measures to overcome the growing crime rate in Detroit. The United Automobile Workers (UAW), then at the height of its size and power, officially endorsed Miriani for reelection, stressing his conservative "law and order" position. However, many African-Americans disagreed with the UAW about Miriani and generally opposed him.

He served until he was defeated for reelection in 1961 by Jerome Cavanagh, in an upset fueled largely by African-American support for Cavanagh. Under Miriani's administration, Detroit's Cobo Hall and other parts of the Civic Center were completed, and the city's infrastructure was expanded. He was again elected to the City Council in 1965.

In 1969, Miriani was convicted of federal tax evasion of $261,000 and served 294 days in prison. He retired from politics after his conviction.

Miriani died after a long illness on October 18, 1987, in Pontiac, Michigan.

Political offices
| Preceded by Albert E. Cobo | Mayor of Detroit; September 12, 1957 – January 2, 1962 | Succeeded by Jerome Cavanagh |
