= Stanley J. Davis =

American politician (1908–2003)

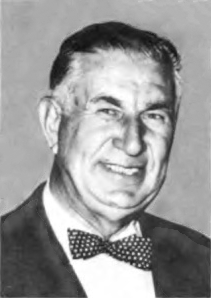

Member of the Michigan House of Representatives from the 92nd district
- In office January 1, 1965 – 1972
- Preceded by: District established
- Succeeded by: Richard D. Buth

Mayor of Grand Rapids, Michigan
- In office 1949–1950
- Preceded by: George W. Welsh
- Succeeded by: Paul G. Goebel
- In office 1958–1963
- Preceded by: Paul G. Goebel
- Succeeded by: C. H. Sonneveldt

Personal details
- Born: May 8, 1908 Poland
- Died: January 23, 2003 (aged 94)
- Party: Democratic
- Spouse: Gladys M. Werkema
- Children: 3

Stanley J. Davis (May 8, 1908 – January 23, 2003) was a Michigan politician.

== Early life ==
Davis was born in Poland on May 8, 1908. Davis graduated from Grand Rapids Union High School and took extension courses at the University of Michigan.

== Career ==
Davis was a florist, owning and operating Flowers by Stan Davis at 1330 Leonard St NW, Grand Rapids, Michigan. Davis previously worked in Shoe Repair. Davis served as mayor of Grand Rapids, Michigan, from 1949 to 1950. In 1950, was the unsuccessful Democratic candidate for the Michigan Senate seat representing the 17th district. Davis once again served as the mayor of Grand Rapids from 1958 to 1963 after unsuccessfully running for the position in 1956. In 1961, Davis was an unsuccessful candidate for the position of delegate to Michigan state constitutional convention from Kent County 1st District. On November 4, 1964, Davis was elected to the Michigan House of Representatives where he represented the 92nd district from January 13, 1965, to 1972. Davis was not re-elected to this position in 1972, and once again was defeated in an election for the same position in 1974.

== Personal life ==
Davis was married to Gladys M. Werkema. Together they had three children. Davis was a member of the Elks and the Knights of Columbus. Davis was a member of the St. James Roman Catholic Church.

== Death ==
Davis died on January 23, 2003.
