= Merle Schlosser =

American football and golf coach

Biographical details
- Born: c. 1928

Playing career

Football
- 1947–1949: Illinois
- Position: End

Coaching career (HC unless noted)

Football
- 1950–1951: Geneseo HS (IL)
- 1952–1953: Monroe HS (MI)
- 1954: Bowling Green (ends)
- 1955–1956: Missouri (ends)
- 1957–1963: Western Michigan

Golf
- 1970–1985: Western Michigan
- 1986: San Diego State

Head coaching record
- Overall: 28–33–3 (college football)
- Bowls: 0–1

Merle J. Schlosser Jr. (born c. 1928) is an American former football and golf coach. He served as the head football coach Western Michigan University from 1957 to 1963, compiling a record of 28–33–3.

Schlosser played college football at the end position for the University of Illinois from 1947 to 1949. Following his graduatation from Illinois, he began his coaching career, in 1950, when he was hired as athletic director and head coach at Geneseo High School in Geneseo, Illinois. After two years at Geneseo, Schlosser was hired as head football coach at Monroe High School in Monroe, Michigan. He led his football team at Monroe to records of 6–2 in 1952 and 7–1 in 1953. In 1954, Schlosser moved to the college coaching ranks as an assistant football coach at Bowling Green State University. He was also appointed as an instructor in health and physical education at Bowling Green.

Schlosser was an assistant football coach under Don Faurot at the University of Missouri from 1955 to 1956. In January 1957, he was hired as the head football coach at Western Michigan. On December 27, 1963, Western Michigan's president, James W. Miller, announced that Schlosser had been fired as football coach, and would be assigned to other duties in the physical education department.

Schlosser later served as the head golf coach at Western Michigan for 16 years. In September 1985, he was hired as the head golf coach at San Diego State University. He resigned from that post in May 1986.

== Head coaching record ==
=== College football ===
Year	Team	Overall	Conference	Standing	Bowl/playoffs
Western Michigan Broncos (Mid-American Conference) (1957–1963)
1957	Western Michigan	4–4–1	1–4–1	T–5th	
1958	Western Michigan	4–5	2–4	T–4th	
1959	Western Michigan	4–5	3–3	T–4th	
1960	Western Michigan	4–4–1	2–4	5th	
1961	Western Michigan	5–4–1	4–1–1	2nd	L Aviation
1962	Western Michigan	5–4	3–3	4th	
1963	Western Michigan	2–7	2–4	5th	
Western Michigan:		28–33–3	17–23–2		
Total:		28–33–3			
