= George Shaw Wheeler =

American economist, advisor to Franklin Roosevelt and defector

- Born: May 22, 1908; Rollingbay, Washington, U.S.
- Died: October 18, 1997 (aged 89); Prague, Czech Republic
- Citizenship: American; Czech
- Occupations: Professor; economist
- Known for: Defected to Czechoslovakia (1947), asked for political asylum (1950)
- Spouse: Eleanor Mitchell
- Children: 4 children
- Parent(s): Francis Marion Wheeler, Jeanie Melissa Shaw
- Relatives: Donald Niven Wheeler

Academic background
- Education: Reed College
- Alma mater: Charles University

Academic work
- Discipline: Economics
- Institutions: NLRB, US DOL, WPB, FEA, Czechoslovakia Academy of Science, Charles University, Washington State University, Franconia College

George Shaw Wheeler (May 22, 1908 – October 18, 1997) (known also as George S. Wheeler) was an American economist and advisor to President Franklin Delano Roosevelt, best known for being the first American to defect over the Iron Curtain to Czechoslovakia in November 1947.

Wheeler's defection inspired his friend Noel Field to defect in 1949 and US Senator Joseph McCarthy cited Wheeler's name when accusing US President Harry S. Truman of "Trumanism", i.e., "the placing of your political party above the interest of the country", specifically when it came to promoting alleged Communist spy Harry Dexter White and others (including Wheeler).

== Background ==
American Couple Asks Czech Haven
Asserting that the immediate reason for the statement was "to protest against the brutal and unlawful treatment by the American occupation authorities of fifty-eight Czechoslovak citizens who were kidnapped in a carefully planned and typically gangster plot and flown over the border of their country," he [Wheeler] declared that "I want to have nothing in common with the Gestapo methods of the executors of American policy ... I place myself proudly in the camp of peace and progress."
(The New York Times, 8 April 1950, page 1)

George Shaw Wheeler was born on May 22, 1908, in Rollingbay near Tacoma, Washington. His parents were Francis Marion Wheeler and Jeanie Melissa Shaw. He had five siblings including sister Margaret Jean Wheeler Schuddakopf and brother Donald Niven Wheeler. In 1924, he graduated from high school in White Bluffs, Washington. In 1929, earned a BA from Reed College in Portland, Oregon, and continued in post-graduate work there to June 1930, followed by post-graduate work at the University of Chicago to August 1934. (In 1961, he received a doctorate in economics from Charles University in Prague.)

== Career ==
In the early 1930s, Wheeler also served as assistant head of the economics department at the University of Chicago. Then, in 1935, he and his wife moved to the Washington, DC area.

=== Government service ===
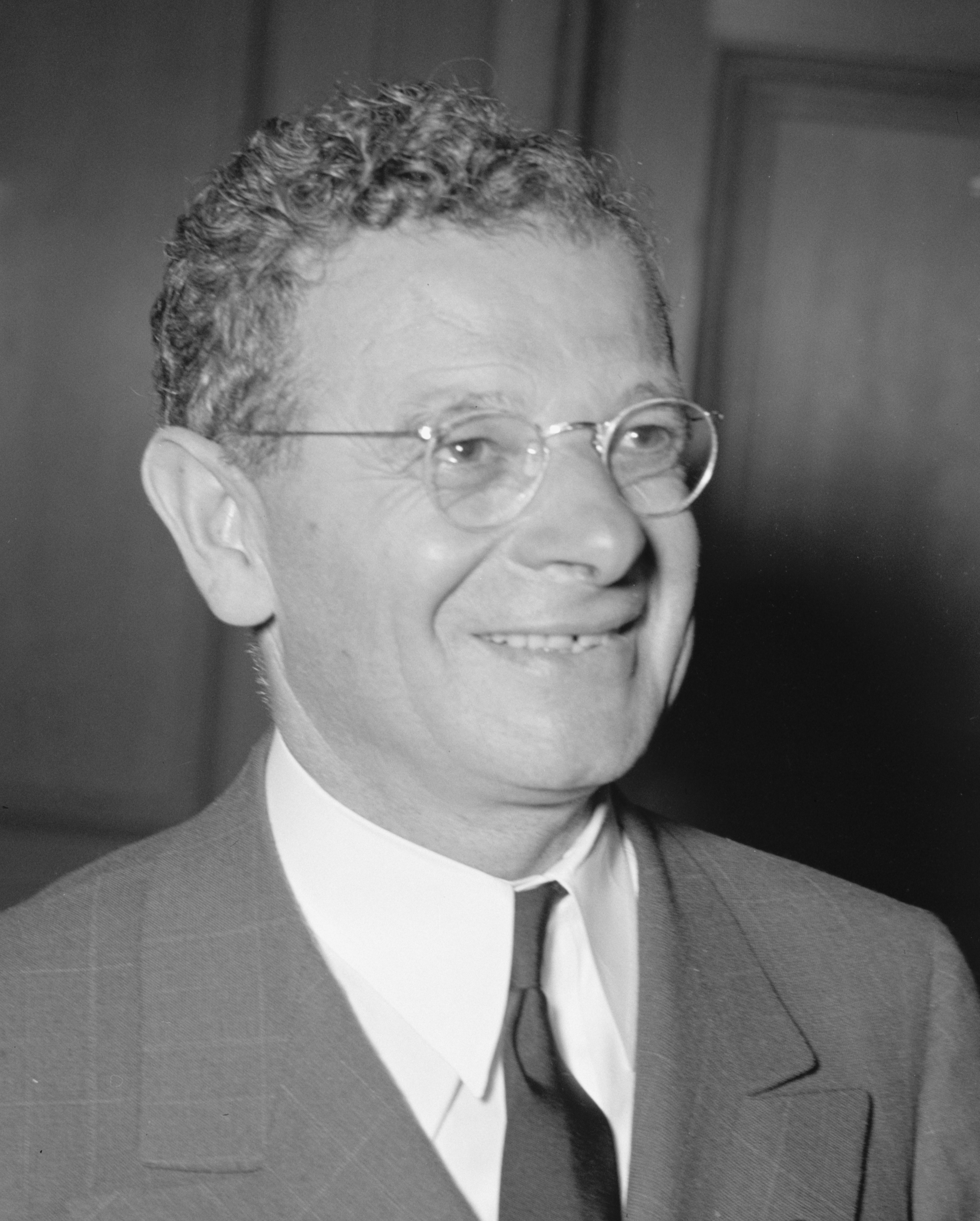
Wheeler received indirect support from Sidney Hillman (here, circa 1940)

On August 16, 1936, Wheeler began to work for the National Labor Relations Board (NLRB). On October 20, 1938, he joined the Wage and Hour Division of the United States Department of Labor. On May 1, 1942, he began work for the War Production Board. On September 18, 1943, he became Chief of Section, Blockade and Re-occupation Branch, Re-occupation Division, Franco Section, Foreign Economic Administration. In the fall of 1944, he moved to London to work in a denazification unit. In May 1945, he was stationed in Germany as a Chief of a Section of the Office of Military Government for Germany, United States (OMGUS) working for the Department of Labor and to head up a denazification unit.

According to Jay Lovestone, Wheeler was there to help control Brigadier General Frank McSherry, "a patsy for the Communists" according to David Dubinsky and who had worked with Sidney Hillman on the War Production Board. In June 1945, Wheeler helped write a 16-page "procedure for organizing unions".

=== Soviet espionage ===
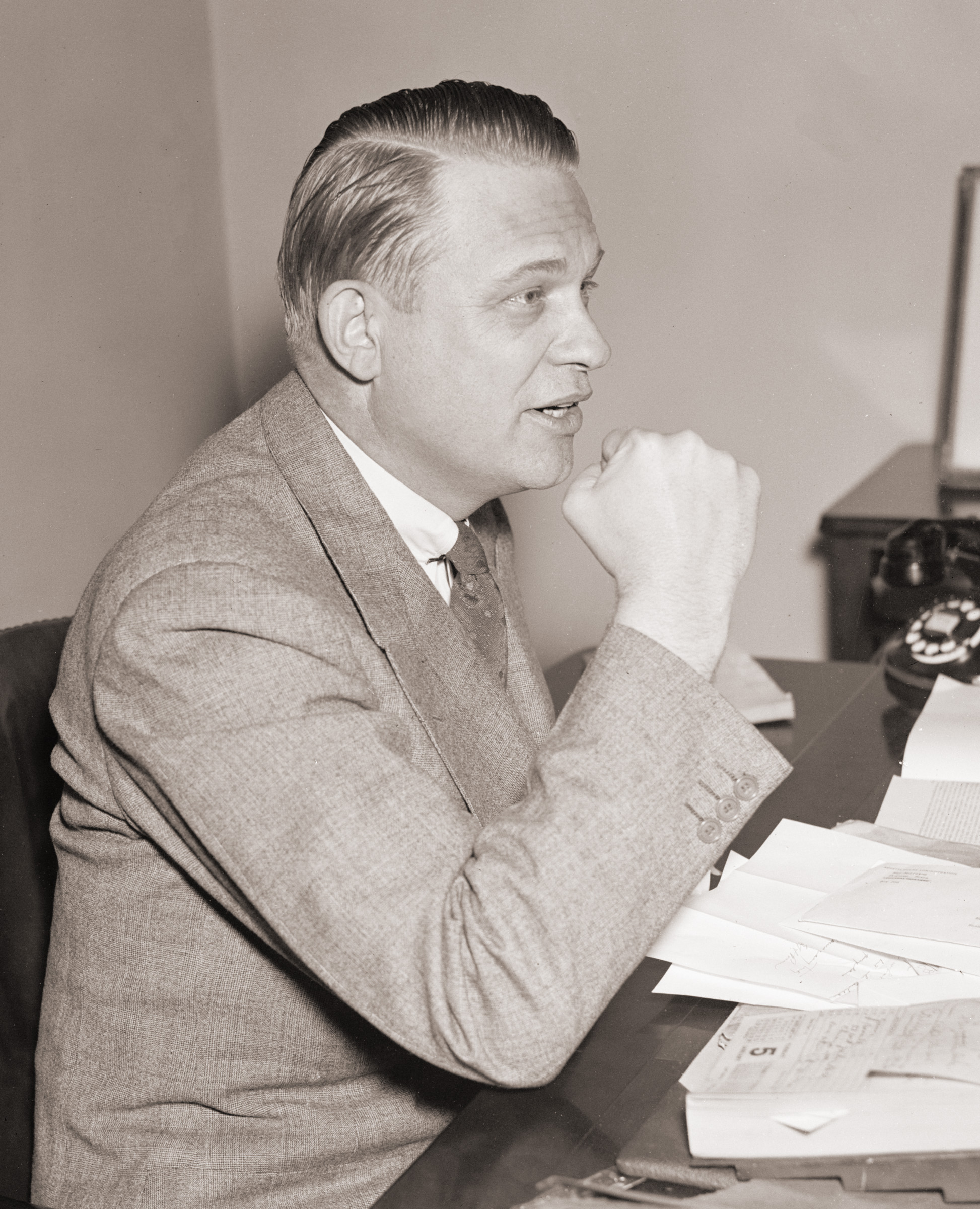
Conservative Texas Democrat Martin Dies Jr. served as chair of the Special Committee on Un-American Activities (predecessor to the permanent House Un-American Activities Committee) for its entire 7-year duration

An FBI report dated February 28, 1942, reported information from the Dies Committee that Wheeler was a member of the American Peace Mobilization's Washington Book Shop and was a member at large of the Executive Council of the Washington Committee to Aid China. On March 24, 1942, the FBI interviewed Wheeler in New York, at which time he denied being a member of the Communist Party. He admitted to being a member of the Washington Committee for Democratic Action and attending meetings of the American Peace Mobilization.

In 1945, the FBI determined that "George S. Wheeler" of Vienna, Virginia (a suburb of Washington, DC), was George Shaw Wheeler of the NLRB.

=== Defection ===
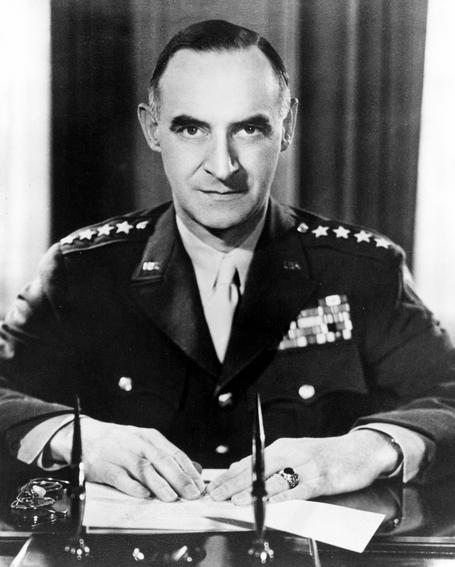
US General Lucius D. Clay helped ease Wheeler out of his job in Germany

In October 1945, Wheeler appeared before the Civil Service Commission Rating Board in Washington, DC. Shortly before, he had been declared ineligible for government employment because he had "followed the Communist line from before 1939". However, another associate of Sidney Hillman named David A. Morse testified for Wheeler, who returned to duty in Germany. By early 1947, Jay Lovestone asked General Lucius D. Clay to have Wheeler eased out.

According to Reed College, "When his contract was not renewed in 1946, he and his family moved to Czechoslovakia to find work. There, he wrote his first book".

On July 9, 1947, US Representative George Anthony Dondero publicly questioned the "fitness" of United States Secretary of War Robert P. Patterson for failing to ferret out Communist infiltrators in his department. The cause for concern arose from what Dondero called his lack of ability to "fathom the wiles of the international Communist conspiracy" and to counteract them with "competent personnel". Dondero cited ten government personnel in the War Department who had Communist backgrounds or leanings: Colonel Bernard Bernstein, Russell A. Nixon, Abraham L. Pomerantz (lawyer who defended Valentin A. Gubitchev in Coplon Case), Josiah E. DuBois Jr., Richard Sasuly, George Shaw Wheeler, Heinz Norden, Max Lowenthal, and Allan Rosenberg (member of Lowenthal's staff). Dondero stated, "It is with considerable regret that I am forced to the conclusion the Secretary Patterson falls short of these standards."

In September 1947, Wheeler's was the chief name in the press noted as "the latest victim of the apparent housecleaning is George S. Wheeler".

On October 15, 1947, Dondero responded by letter to the editor to an unsigned editorial dated October 5 in The Washington Post entitled "Trial by Whimsy". Dondero asked "to reopen the entire unsavory record of the case of George Shaw Wheeler". He expressed desire "to make public the record of this entire proceeding regardless of whom it may involve".

In November 1947, Wheeler fled behind the Iron Curtain into Czechoslovakia. He became a professor of economics at the Charles University. He also became Prague correspondent for the radical National Guardian of New York City, according to the publications executive editor James Aronson. There he wrote economic "propaganda works" and in 1963 became a member of the Czechoslovak Academy of Science.

On April 6, 1948, Dondero again questioned support for Wheeler from William Treadwell Stone and David A. Morse.

In a July 9, 1948, letter to The Washington Post, Wheeler countered Dondero's 1947 and 1948 charges at length. He dismissed Dondero's charges because Dondero in fact disliked their roles in Nazi war crimes trials, denazification, investigations into German corporate conglomerates (e.g., I.G. Farben), and supporting the New Deal so-called "discredited" policies of US Presidents Roosevelt and Truman (particularly the Potsdam Agreement). Wheeler notes that he received two further clearances by government investigators since Dondero made his allegations. Further, the government never made any specific charges of disloyalty. He cites a stream of "excellent" ratings for performance (most late in September 1947) and a letter of recommendation from an Army colonel dated March 10, 1948, for his "policies and plans" as "democratic and practicable". Rather than defecting, Wheeler says that he entered Czechoslovakia "the way thousands of other tourists" and stayed to lecture "in the field in which I am trained". Wheeler counters Dondero's query, "Will anyone pay for the damage that has been done?" (i.e., by Wheeler's alleged communist sympathies) with his own thoughts on suing Dondero for slander but concludes it too "time-consuming" and a "costly procedure which I cannot afford".

(In 1949, Noel Field, another American spy for the Soviets, found inspiration in Wheeler's successful flight and new life led him to seek refuge in Czechoslovakia for himself. Both men had come under investigation by the House Un-American Activities Committee.)

=== Political asylum ===
In April 1950, the story of Wheeler's defection received renewed press when he publicly requested political asylum in Czechoslovakia. The Washington Post noted that "The loyalty record of George S. Wheeler, ousted United States military government official who last Friday asked asylum in Communist-run Czechoslovakia was aired in Congress nearly three years ago." The Post noted that on July 9, 1947 (after Wheeler's defection), and again on April 6, 1948, US Representative Dondero had questioned support for Wheeler from William Treadwell Stone and David A. Morse. Stone, by then at Voice of America, denied Dondero's allegation; Morse, by then at the International Labour Organization in Geneva, made no statement. Time article "Foreign News: At Home", which recounted how Wheeler had recently "denounced the frauds" of the Marshall Plan, the Atlantic Pact, the Truman Doctrine and aid for backward areas as undermining the welfare and independence of the countries affected and enriching American capitalists.

Wheeler used the public interest to denounce his enemies. He claimed that his denazification efforts had faced opposition from "representatives of international cartels and trusts". He accused Robert Murphy, an adviser to the US Military Governor, of being in fact an "unofficial representative of the Vatican". He derided former Brigadier General William Draper Jr. for being a vice president of Dillon, Read & Co., "representing the interests of Wall Street".

On August 31, 1950, Abraham George Silverman refused to answer questions about Wheeler, his brother Donald Niven Wheeler (wrongly cited by HUAC as "David Niven Wheeler"), or Allan Rosenberg while testifying before HUAC. On September 1, 1950, John Abt refused answer questions about Donald Niven Wheeler (again, wrongly cited by HUAC as "David Niven Wheeler").

Wheeler's public request for political asylum remained in the press throughout the year. On October 19, 1950, columnist Walter Winchell (who by then had gone from liberal to conservative) commented:

The Man Without a Country has turned from fiction to fact ... George Shaw Wheeler (native American), who denounced the United States and renounced his citizenship–asked' the Communists in Prague for asylum ... He is now in dire straits–despised even by the Reds and loathed by the Czechs ... He is a most pitiful figure there, we are informed ... Through a friendly Embassy Wheeler sent word this week that he wants to get out of the Red Paradise–back home–to the USA.
This is to inform him that the United States does not admit foreigners with Communist records and that he will not be admitted to this native American soil again-even to be buried.

=== Continued allegations ===
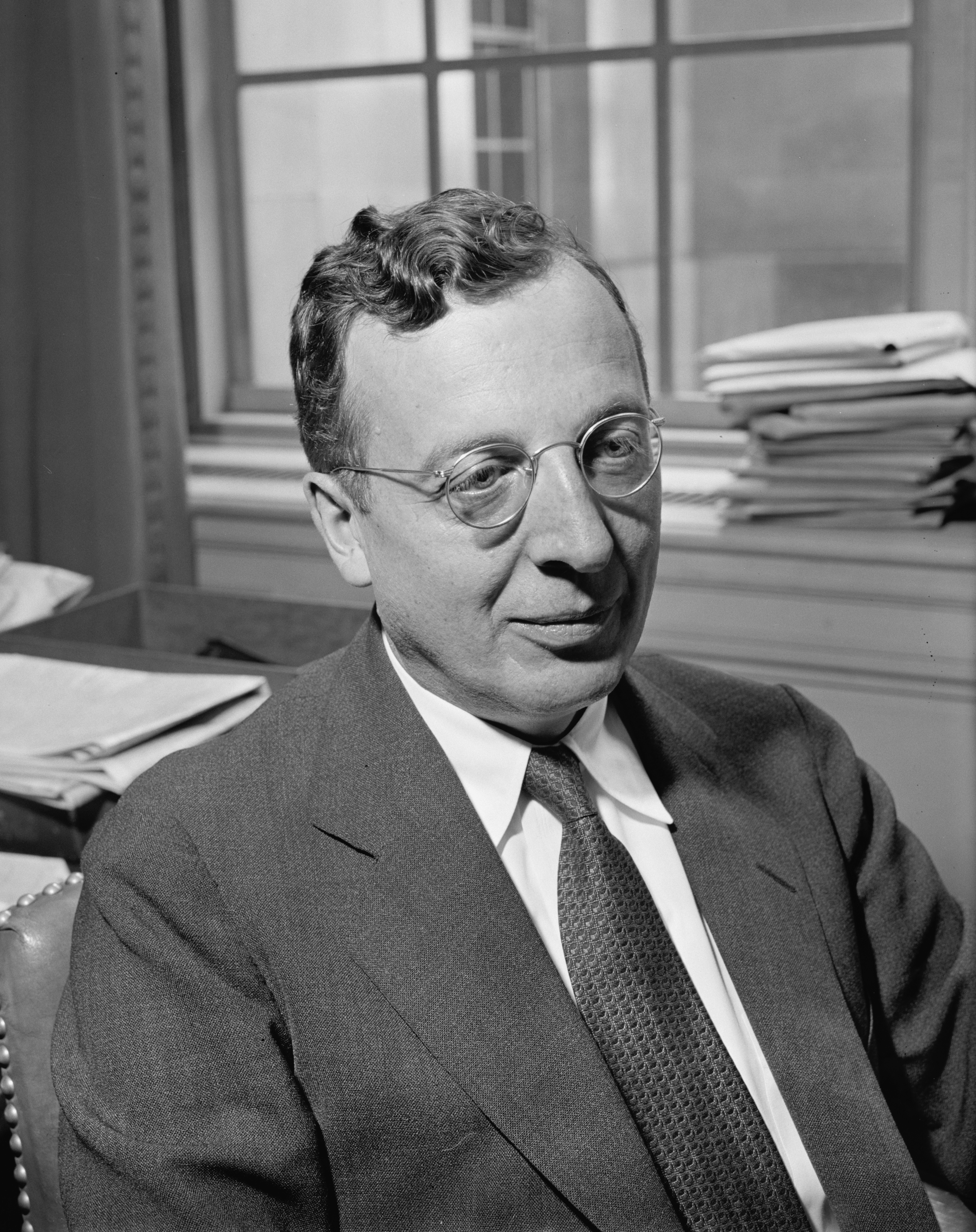
Truman friend Max Lowenthal helped get Wheeler government jobs

On November 19, 1950, the government published Max Lowenthal's closed-session testimony from September 15, 1950. During testimony, Lowenthal had denied aiding or abetting Communists in government service. Specifically, he denied any involvement in the employment or sponsoring of George Shaw Wheeler. Lowenthal noted that Wheeler had been transferred to his division on the Board of Economic Warfare from the War Production Board "toward the end of my service with the board" He also said that Wheeler had not worked with him in Germany.

In 1951, the Saturday Evening Post mentioned Wheeler and Lowenthal in a long article on Carol Weiss King:

Lowenthal is of special interest. A product of Harvard Law, he has been described by a New Deal associate as "self-effacing and ubiquitous". Shuttling between New York and Washington, he has maintained a New York office while holding a variety of Government posts dating back to World War I. On one hand, he has been an assiduous cultivator of high-level friendships, including Presidents Roosevelt and Truman and Supreme Court Justices Felix Frankfurter and Louis Brandeis. On the other, he has been an equally assiduous collector of proteges for whom he has found many Government jobs. Alger Hiss and Lee Pressman benefited by his friendship, and, for a time, did one George Shaw Wheeler, a young lawyer who became so carried away by communism that he denounced his United States citizenship to make a new career bebind the Iron Curtain. Back in 1920, at the time of her admission to the New York bar, Carol also was a Lowenthal protégée, and it was in his office that she served her first and only legal clerkship.

(Note: The detail about Wheeler's being a lawyer conflicts with other available resources, which call him an economist.)

=== McCarthy and other allegations ===
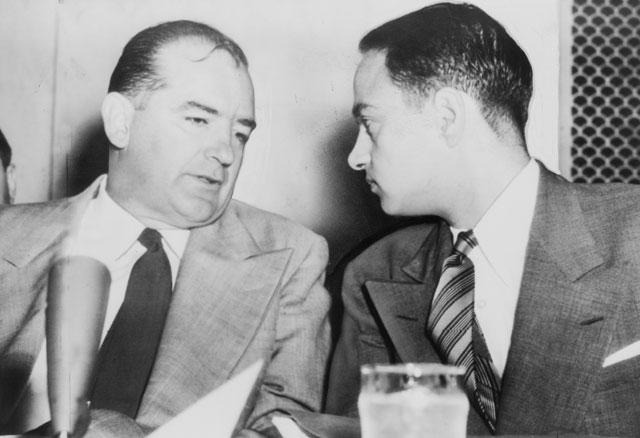
Joseph McCarthy invoked Wheeler's defection in his attacks on former US President Harry Truman (here, McCarthy chats with Roy Cohn during Army-McCarthy hearings)

Text of Senator McCarthy's Speech Accusing Truman of aiding Suspected Red Agents
In connection with Communist infiltration of our government let me give you, if I may, very briefly, another case in which Truman intervened in behalf of a communist agent.
On April 13, 1950, Georg Shaw Wheeler, who had been working for the United States Government in Europe, deserted to the Communist cause. At that time he denounced what he called, and I quote, the "Gestapo methods" of the United States. He stated that he was going to stand "proudly with the Soviet regime." Wheeler then disappeared behind the Iron Curtain.
Now, what does Truman have to do with this? As early as 1944 the Civil Service Commission Loyalty Board had found Wheeler disloyal because of Communist and espionage activities.
Listen to these dates, if you will. On October 4, 1944, Harry Truman, candidate for Vice President, wrote a three-page letter to the Civil Service Commission denouncing the commission in the strongest language for having ordered the dismissal of Wheeler. That was in 1944. In October 1945, Harry Truman, as President, the Civil Service Commission then reversed itself and ordered Wheeler reinstated.
and, of course, as you know, Wheeler is now behind the Iron Curtain, having admitted that he was an espionage agent
(The New York Times, 25 November 1953, page 5)

In a speech on November 24, 1953, broadcast on radio and television, US Senator Joseph McCarthy cited Wheeler as an example of how the New Deal government was "crawling with communists" (a week after US Attorney General Herbert Brownell Jr. had questioned Truman's role in promoting the late Harry Dexter White). He chastised then US Senator Truman for intervening and stopping the dismissal of Wheeler from government service. McCarthy then questioned why another American official who had served in Germany, John Paton Davies Jr., also questioned by a loyalty board, was still in government. Newspapers reported that "Democrats interpret the Wheeler reference, therefore, as a carefully veiled warning to Ike", in that then General Dwight Eisenhower was still based in Germany at the time. The Eisenhower Administration saw the Wheeler mention as an attack on the President as well as General Clay. They also noted that the speech placed McCarthy in a position of "wide and nearly implacable opposition to President Eisenhower".

On April 24, 1954, United States Secretary of Labor James P. Mitchell told the US House Appropriations Committee that his department had dismissed five employees for "falsifying their job applications" and another 17 with "unfavorable information in their files were allowed to resign". During the same hearing, US Representative Fred E. Busbey stated that Under Secretary David A. Morse "once helped to get a loyalty clearance for a Federal employee who later "went behind the Iron Curtain to join the Communists". Busbey named that person as "John Shaw Wheeler", but The New York Times corrected by stating "Busbey apparently referred to the case of George Shaw Wheeler".

In 1954, the Czechoslovak Academy of Sciences hired Wheeler as an economist and writer.

On April 21, 1959, during testimony before the House Un-American Activities Committee (HUAC), labor leader Harry Bridges stated that he had met twice with Wheeler in Czechoslovakia. Bridges had known Wheeler and his wife earlier, when they both worked at the Cooperative Bookshop. He did not know how Wheeler had come to know of his visit to the country. He reported that Wheeler was "teaching at the university." Bridges claimed to have no knowledge of his citizenship status.

=== Later years ===
In 1961, Wheeler earned a doctorate in economics from Charles University in Prague.

In 1968, Wheeler returned to the United States. In 1971, he became a professor at Washington State University. In 1973, his new book The Human Face of Socialism received notice in The New York Times. Wheeler retired from Washington State University and taught at Franconia College until 1977. He and his wife lived in retired in Grapeview, Washington. In 1990, he returned to Czechoslovakia and lived with one of his daughters.

== Personal life and death ==
In the early 1930s, Wheeler married Eleanor Mitchell of Ketchikan, Alaska. They had four children. Eleanor died in 1981 and Wheeler died age 90 on October 18, 1998, in Prague.

== Legacy ==
The University of Washington has archived the letters of George Shaw Wheeler and his wife Eleanor Wheeler under the title "Wheeler Eleanor papers, 1947-1957." They comprise 698 typed pages, important for observations of political shifts in Czechoslovakia 1947–61.

== Works ==
Wheeler's books appeared in English, Czech, Russian, German and Chinese.

- Employee Elections Conducted by National Labor Relations Board (1935)
- G.S. Wheeler, bojovník za mier ("G.S. Wheeler, a warrior for peace") (1950)
- Výstraha ("Warning") (1956)
- Vývoj a problémy zemědělství USA ("Development and Problems of Agriculture in the USA") (1958)
- Die amerikanische Politik in Deutschland (1945-1950) ("US Politics in Germany (1945-1950)") (1958)
- Развитие сельского хозяйства ССHА и его проблемы ("US agricultural development and its problems") (1959)
  - 美国农业的发展和问題 ("US agricultural development and its problems") (1962)
- Американская политика в Германии, 1945-1950 ("American politics in Germany, 1945-1950") (1960)
  - 美国对德政策, 1945-1950 ("US policy toward Germany, 1945-1950") (1962)
- Who Split Germany? Wall Street and the West German trade union leaders (1962)
- The Human Face of Socialism: The Political Economy of Change in Czechoslovakia (1973)
- Contraddizioni del socialismo: economia e democrazia in Cecoslovacchia (1976)

== See also ==
- List of Western Bloc defectors
- Wheeler (surname)

== External sources ==
- Reed College - Memoriam George Wheeler '29
- Harbor History Museum: The Red Scare
- British Pathe: George Wheeler Renounces US
- People's World: Donald N. Wheeler
- Frostburg State University: George A. Meyers Collection
- Congressional Record - Senate
- Florida State University: Fred E. Busbey Papers, 1910-1965
