= Mary Price (alleged spy) =

American who spied for the Soviet Union

Mary Price

Mary Wolfe Price (1909–1980) was an American who was accused of being a spy for the Soviet Union.

== Early years ==
Born in 1909 in Rockingham County, North Carolina, Price graduated from the University of North Carolina at Chapel Hill in 1931. She eventually made her way to New York City, where she worked as secretary to journalist Walter Lippmann of the New York Herald.

== Espionage career ==
Sometime prior to March 1941, Mary Price allegedly agreed to furnish Jacob Golos, controller of the secret apparatus of the Communist Party of the USA (CPUSA) on behalf of the Soviet Union, with all the information she could concerning the material Lippmann was writing and his contacts. Elizabeth Bentley was made the courier between Washington D.C., where Price worked, and New York City, where she and Golos lived together.

Price allegedly became a "cut out", or go-between, for government employees who were also members of the CPUSA secret apparatus. Among them were Maurice Halperin, Duncan Lee, Helen Tenney of the Office of Strategic Services (OSS), Robert Miller of the U.S. State Department, and Michael Greenberg, an associate of presidential aide Lauchlin Currie. Lee was the personal assistant to OSS head General William J. Donovan, the first intelligence chief in America's newly created wartime intelligence agency. The material from Halperin was considered extremely valuable especially how it related to the Polish government in exile.

Mary Price's apartment in Washington eventually became the rendezvous point for meetings between Golos' courier and the Perlo group. Various members of the Perlo group would meet with Bentley every two or three weeks in the apartment. Those members delivering stolen intelligence materials included Victor Perlo, chief of the Aviation Section, War Production Board (WPB); Edward Fitzgerald of the WPB; Charles Kramer who worked for Senate Subcommittee on War Mobilization, the Office of Price Administration, and Senate Subcommittee on Wartime Health and Education throughout World War II; Allen Rosenberg, who was on the Board of Economic Warfare and became Chief of the Economic Institution Staff of the Foreign Economic Administration; and Donald Wheeler of the OSS Analysis division.

Soviet intelligence considered the Perlo group to be an extremely valuable asset, and upon the death of Golos in late 1942, sought to control Mary Price directly.

Iskhak Akhmerov, chief of the NKGB illegal station in the U.S., wanted to establish her in an apartment in the Georgetown section of Washington for the sexual entrapment of blackmail victims.

In November 1944, Anatoly Gorsky reported to Moscow that according to Elizabeth Bentley, Price had begun a sexual relationship with one of her sources, Duncan Chaplin Lee. "(Price) established an intimate relationship with (Lee), and she did not tell us about it until recently." Gorsky was concerned that this affair might result in Lee's exposure as a spy because his wife, who was also a member of the Communist Party of the United States (CPUSA), knew about his spying. "(Lee) and (Price) met in two places, at her flat and at his. The meetings were held in the presence of (Lee's) wife, who was aware of her husband's secret work." Lee's wife discovered her husband's love affair and complained in a series of jealous scenes. The NKVD became worried about these developments and ordered her to stop serving as his courier.

Elizabeth Bentley claimed Price was psychologically unfit for further clandestine work. The head of the CPUSA, Earl Browder, later released her from the NKGB. Her code name used by Soviet intelligence was "Dir".

== Political activities and later years ==
Price, by now retired from spying, returned to North Carolina around 1945 and organized the state chapter of a liberal group, the Southern Conference for Human Welfare. In 1948, Price became the head of the state's Progressive Party. As the Progressive Party nominee, she was the first woman to appear on the ballot as a candidate for Governor of North Carolina. After Bentley accused Price of being a spy in July of that year, she came in a distant third in the election, and moved back to Washington, D.C., where she worked at the embassy of Czechoslovakia. In 1951, Price met and married Charles Adamson Jr. of Cedartown, Georgia. The couple had no children, and divorced in 1964. In later years, she worked for the National Council of Churches. She died in California in 1980.

== Sources ==
- Haynes, John Earl & Klehr, Harvey (2000). Venona: Decoding Soviet Espionage in America. Yale University Press. ISBN 0-300-08462-5.
- Oral History Interview with Mary Price Adamson from Oral Histories of the American South
