= Harvey Hollister Bundy =

American lawyer and civil servant (1888–1963)

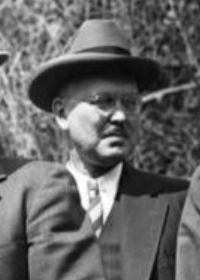
- Born: March 30, 1888; Grand Rapids, Michigan, U.S.
- Died: October 7, 1963 (aged 75); Boston, Massachusetts, U.S.
- Education: Yale University (BA); Harvard University (LLB)
- Occupation: Attorney
- Spouse: Katherine Lawrence Putnam
- Children: 5, including William and McGeorge

Harvey Hollister Bundy Sr. (March 30, 1888 – October 7, 1963) was an American attorney who served as a special assistant to the secretary of war during World War II. He was the father of William Bundy and McGeorge Bundy, who both served at high levels as government advisors.

== Early life and education ==
Harvey Hollister Bundy was born in Grand Rapids, Michigan, the son of McGeorge, a lawyer, and Mary Goodhue (Hollister) Bundy; he was grandson to Solomon Bundy, a lawyer and New York Congressman. Bundy attended Yale University and was initiated into the Skull and Bones in 1909. He went on to earn his law degree from Harvard Law School in 1914. That same year, he began working as a law clerk for Supreme Court Justice Oliver Wendell Holmes.

== Career ==
Bundy became a prominent attorney in Boston at his father-in-law's law firm, Putnam, Putnam & Bell.

Bundy and his wife Katherine met Colonel Henry L. Stimson, and the three became friends. Their sons grew up knowing Stimson as a family friend and colleague of their father. Working under President Herbert Hoover, Stimson appointed Bundy as Assistant Secretary of State in July 1931 until March 1933. Bundy also served as special legal assistant to the U.S. Secretary of the Treasury.

During World War II he served again under Stimson, then Secretary of War under President Franklin D. Roosevelt, as his Special Assistant on Atomic Matters beginning in 1941. He served as liaison between Stimson and the director of the Office of Scientific Research and Development, Vannevar Bush. Bundy also helped implement the Marshall Plan after the war. After the war, his son McGeorge Bundy worked with Stimson to co-author his autobiography, On Active Service in Peace and War (1947).

After the war, he became president of the board of trustees of the World Peace Foundation.

In 1952, he succeeded John Foster Dulles as chairman of the Carnegie Endowment for International Peace, serving until 1958. (Note: son William Bundy became embroiled in a 1953 scandal, when Senator Joseph McCarthy cited his earlier $400 contribution to Alger Hiss's defense fund in the Hiss-Chambers case. Bundy explained that Donald Hiss, Alger's brother, worked with him at Covington & Burling. Allen Dulles and Vice President Richard M. Nixon defended him, and the matter dropped. Previously, Hiss had served as president at Carnegie in 1946–1949.)

== Personal life ==
In 1917, Bundy married Katherine Lawrence Putnam, daughter of William Lowell Putnam and niece to Harvard president Abbott Lawrence Lowell. They had three sons, Harvey Bundy Jr., William Bundy and McGeorge Bundy, and two daughters, Harriet Lowell and Katharine Lawrence. Through his daughter Katharine, Bundy is the great-grandfather of Massachusetts congressman Jake Auchincloss.

He served on the board of the Dexter School in its earliest years.

At the age of 75, Harvey Hollister Bundy Sr died on Monday, October 7, 1963, at his home in the city of Boston, Massachusetts.

== See also ==
- List of law clerks for the second seat of the Supreme Court of the United States
