= Putnam, Bell & Russell =

Law office in Massachusetts

- Headquarters: Marblehead, Massachusetts
- Offices: Boston, Chatham (former HQs)
- Key people: William Lowell Putnam, Harvey Hollister Bundy, Allan Rosenberg (spy), Stoughton Bell
- Founder: George Putnam II

Putnam, Bell & Russell is a law office in Marblehead, Massachusetts, which was "one of the first law offices in Boston" and once represented the American Telephone and Telegraph Company when its headquarters were on Boston.

== History ==
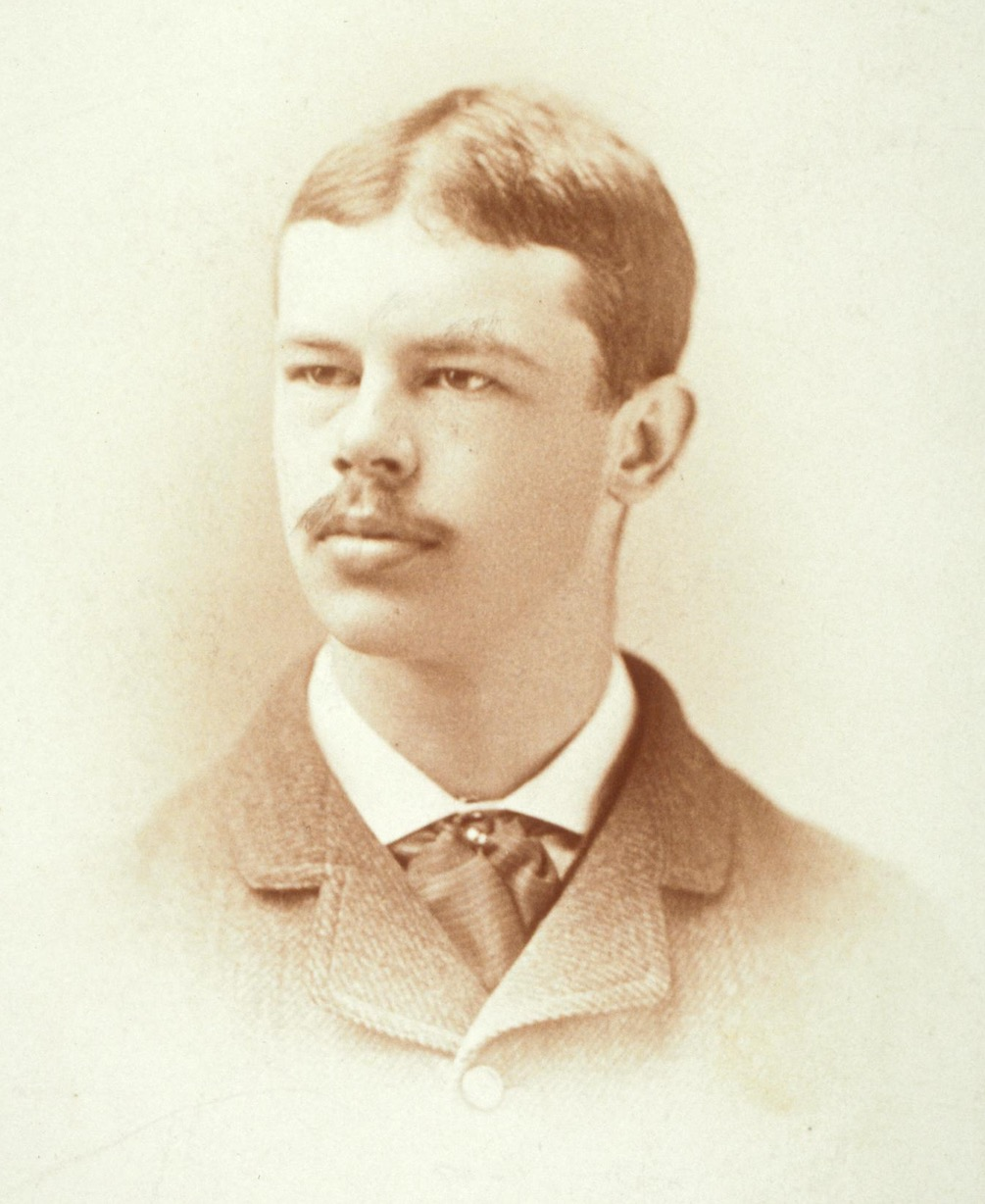
William Lowell Putnam (here ca. 1880–1890) led Putnam, Bell & Russell to its height

Putnam, Bell & Russell law offices began as the law office of William Whiting (1838-1845), followed by Whiting & Russell (1845-1873). In 1873, the firm reforged as Russell & Putnam (1873-1896), when George Putnam II (1834-1912), a member of the elite Boston Brahmins family Putnam, joined William Russell.

=== William Lowell Putnam ===
In 1886, his son William Lowell Putnam (1861-1924) joined Russell & Putnam. In 1896, when the son became a partner, the firm became known as "Putnam & Putnam." In 1910, the firm became known as "Putnam, Putnam & Bell." William Lowell Putnam served as counsel to the American Telephone and Telegraph Company when its headquarters were in Boston and remained on the company's board of directors when it moved headquarters to New York City. William Lowell Putnam II was a banker as well as lawyer who married Elizabeth Lowell, handled a large part of the Lowell family's finances, and served as primary lawyer for both Percival Lowell and the Lowell Observatory while working as a partner at the well-regarded law firm of (then) Putnam, Putnam & Bell. William's brother James Lowell Putnam (born 1872) was also a member of Putnam, Putnam & Bell.

=== Harvey Hollister Bundy ===
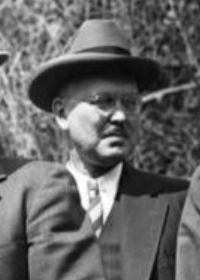
Harvey Hollister Bundy joined his father-in-law William Lowell Putnam's law firm Putnam, Putnam & Bell

After clerking to Supreme Court Justice Oliver Wendell Holmes and working in the law office of Hale & Grinnell, Harvey Hollister Bundy joined Putnam, Putnam & Bell in 1916, where he worked through 1917. In 1917, he also married Katherine Lawrence Putnam, daughter of William Lowell Putnam and niece to Harvard president Abbott Lawrence Lowell. (They had three sons, Harvey Bundy Jr., William Bundy and McGeorge Bundy.) Bundy became a prominent attorney at his father-in-law's law firm, Putnam, Putnam & Bell. In 1919, Bundy rejoined Putnam, Putnam & Bell, which became Putnam, Bell, Dutch & Santry after Charles F. Dutch and Arthur J. Santry became partners. In 1929, he joined Choate, Hall & Stewart (which Alger Hiss joined the following year).

By 1955, the firm had renamed itself Putnam, Bell & Russell with offices at 53 State Street. Stoughton Bell (1874-1967) was a senior partner.

=== Allan Rosenberg ===
Allan R. Rosenberg was a partner at Putnam, Bell & Russell, which he joined in 1949. While at the firm, Rosenberg handled prominent cases. In April 1951, Rosenberg argued for the complainant Joint Anti-Fascist Refugee Committee in Anti-Fascist Committee v. McGrath before the U.S. Supreme Court. In 1969, Rosenberg represented Dr. Benjamin Spock. (In 1962, Spock had joined The Committee for a Sane Nuclear Policy, otherwise known as SANE. Spock was politically outspoken and active in the movement to end the Vietnam War. In 1968, he and four others (William Sloane Coffin, Marcus Raskin, Mitchell Goodman, and Michael Ferber) were singled out for prosecution by US Attorney General Ramsey Clark on charges of conspiracy to counsel, aid, and abet resistance to the draft. Spock and three of his alleged co-conspirators were convicted, although the five had never been in the same room together. His two-year prison sentence was never served; the case was appealed and in 1969 a federal court set aside his conviction.) Spock's legal team included Leonard Boudin with Victor Rabinowitz of Rabinowitz, Boudin & Standard (New York City) and Allan R. Rosenberg of Putnam, Bell & Russell (Boston). Rosenberg represented the United Electrical Workers union in New England, as well as the New England Subaru Dealers Council. He also counseled "hundreds of workers" in front of the Massachusetts Industrial Accident Board. Rosenberg retired from the firm in 1987.

Other members of Putnam, Bell & Russell include John Dusen (probate, tax, civil litigation), John. G. Serino, and Charles Russell.

The firm was based for some time under Charles Russell in Chatham, Massachusetts, but is now listed in Marblehead, Massachusetts.
