= George Anthony Dondero =

American politician (1883–1968)

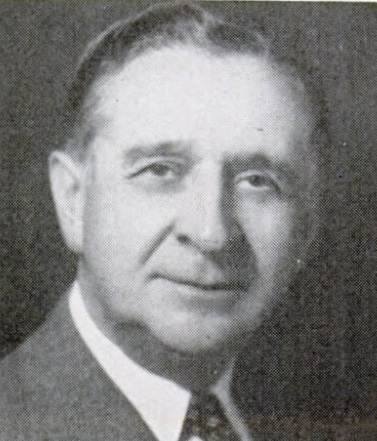
- From 1953's Pocket Congressional Directory of the 83rd Congress

Member of the U.S. House of Representatives from Michigan
- In office March 4, 1933 – January 3, 1957
- Preceded by: Constituency established
- Succeeded by: William Broomfield
- Constituency: 17th district (1933–53); 18th district (1953–57)

Personal details
- Born: December 16, 1883 Greenfield Township, Michigan
- Died: January 29, 1968 (aged 84) Royal Oak, Michigan
- Party: Republican
- Spouse: Adele Dondero
- Profession: Attorney

George Anthony Dondero (December 16, 1883 – January 29, 1968) was a Republican member of the U.S. House of Representatives from Michigan.

== Background ==
Dondero was born on a farm in Greenfield Township, Michigan, which has since become part of Detroit. His father was an immigrant from Italy and his mother was an immigrant from Germany.

== Career ==
Dondero served as the village clerk of Royal Oak, Michigan, in 1905 and 1906; as town treasurer in 1907 and 1908; and as village assessor in 1909. He graduated from the Detroit College of Law in 1910, was admitted to the bar, and started a practice in Royal Oak the same year. He was village attorney in 1911 to 1921 and assistant prosecuting attorney for Oakland County in 1918 and 1919. He was mayor of Royal Oak in 1921 and 1922 and a member of the board of education in 1910 to 1928.

In 1932, Dondero was elected as a Republican to the 73rd United States Congress and the eleven succeeding Congresses, serving from March 4, 1933, to January 3, 1957. He represented Michigan's 17th congressional district, which had been newly created by redistricting after the 1930 census. After the 1950 census, most of Dondero's territory became the 18th district. Dondero was elected two more times from that district. Both districts are now obsolete.

From 1937, to 1947 Dondero served as ranking member of the House Committee on Education. He was chairman of the Committee on Public Works in the 80th and 81st Congresses. In 1954, he sponsored the bill creating the Saint Lawrence Seaway, which allowed large ocean-going vessels access to the Great Lakes.

Sympathetic to McCarthyism, Dondero claimed that American liberals had been responsible for a "whitewash" over the Amerasia affair.

In 1947, Dondero tried to block the trial of IG Farben executives for war crimes at Nuremberg by withholding funding for the prosecution team before indictments could be handed down.

On July 9, 1947, Dondero included Rosenberg when he publicly questioned the "fitness" of US Secretary of War Robert P. Patterson for failing to ferret out communist infiltrators in his department. His cause for concern arose from what Dondero called Patterson's lack of ability to "fathom the wiles of the international Communist conspiracy" and to counteract them with "competent personnel." Dondero cited ten government personnel in the War Department who had communist backgrounds or leanings:

- Colonel Bernard Bernstein
- Russel A. Nixon
- Abraham L. Pomerantz
- Josiah E. DuBois Jr.
- Richard Sasuly
- George Shaw Wheeler
- Heinz Norden
- Max Lowenthal
- Allan Rosenberg (member of Lowenthal's staff)

Dondero stated, "It is with considerable regret that I am forced to the conclusion the Secretary Patterson falls short of these standards."

== Attack on modern art ==
Dondero was most notable for mounting an attack on modern art, which he claimed to be inspired by communism. He asserted that "Cubism aims to destroy by designed disorder.... Dadaism aims to destroy by ridicule.... Abstractionism aims to destroy by the creation of brainstorms." In 1952, Dondero went on to tell Congress that modern art was a conspiracy by Moscow to spread communism to the United States. The speech won him the International Fine Arts Council's Gold Medal of Honor for "dedicated service to American Art." When the art critic Emily Genauer, who later won the Pulitzer Prize for Criticism, interviewed Dondero in the mid-1950s, he stated that "modern art is Communistic because it is distorted and ugly, because it does not glorify our beautiful country, our cheerful and smiling people, our material progress. Art which does not glorify our beautiful country in plain simple terms that everyone can understand breeds dissatisfaction. It is therefore opposed to our government and those who promote it are our enemies." When Genauer pointed out the resemblance between his views and those of the Stalinist communists that he despised, Dondero was so enraged that he arranged to have her fired from her job at the New York Herald Tribune.

== Death ==
Dondero died at the age of 84 in Royal Oak, Michigan, and is interred there at Oakview Cemetery.

== Notes ==
U.S. House of Representatives
Preceded by None	United States Representative for the 17th congressional district of Michigan; 1933 – 1953	Succeeded by Charles G. Oakman
Preceded by None	United States Representative for the 18th congressional district of Michigan; 1953 – 1957	Succeeded by William Broomfield
