= Abraham Pomerantz =

American lawyer (1903–1982)

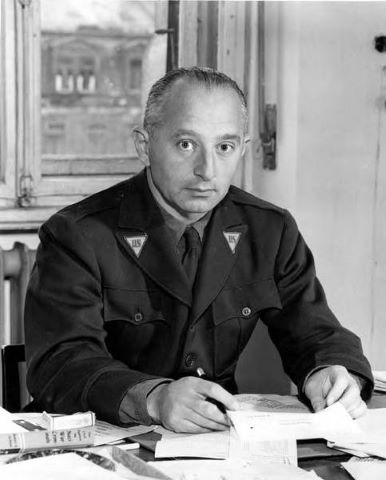
Pomerantz in 1946

Abraham Louis Pomerantz (March 22, 1903 – November 20, 1982) was an American attorney who "pioneered shareholder suits against major corporations and for a time directed the prosecution of German industrialists after World War II." He also defended Soviet diplomat Valentin A. Gubitchev in the 1949-1950 Judith Coplon case.

== Background ==
Abraham L. Pomerantz was born on March 22, 1903, in Brooklyn, New York. In 1924, Pomerantz studied at Brooklyn Law School at night.

== Career ==
=== Law ===
Pomerantz started the practice of law at $4 a week. The New York Times wrote of him "He championed the virtues of Socialism and the rights of the poor while commanding large legal fees."

Pomerantz was a founding partner of the law firm of Pomerantz Levy Haudek Block Grossman & Gross LLP. He is considered by many to have been the "dean of the class action bar". He pioneered suits by small shareholders against officials of such big corporations as McDonnell Douglas Corporation and the Dreyfus Fund.

In 1933, Pomerantz brought his first major shareholder suit by representing an investor with twenty shares of National City Bank of New York against the bank's chairman and CEO. He also won in cases involving Canadian Javelin, Warner Brothers Pictures, Fairchild Camera, First National City Bank, Hearst Consolidated Publications, Brooklyn Union Gas, and two odd-lot brokers, Carlisle & Jacquelin and DeCoppet & Doremus.

He specialized in so-called derivative suits, in which the company receives the award and passes it on to all stockholders. That original law firm is now called Pomerantz LLP and no longer embraces the derivative suit approach. It currently specializes in bringing lucrative class action lawsuits against high-profile companies.

Prominent legal cases include:

- 1946: Strike by American Communications Association CIO v. Western Union Telegraph Company (motion by Western Union to disqualify ACA attorney Pomerantz)
- 1948: Kaiser Aluminum
- 1969: Shareholders v. Hartford Fire Insurance Company
- 1970: Ross v. Bernhard, 396 U.S. 531: Right to trial by jury in derivative actions
- 1970: Case against Morgan Guaranty Trust Company and Chemical Bank of New York
- 1973: Putnam Management
- 1982 Gartenberg v. Merrill Lynch Asset Management, Inc., 694 F.2d 923 in the second circuit: Investment company advisory fee may violate Section 36(b) of Investment Company Act of 1940 when lacking reasonable relationship to services rendered)
- 1987: Kronfeld v. Trans World Airlines, Inc., 832 F.2d 726 in the second circuitL Corporation may have to disclose ongoing merger negotiations

=== World War II ===
In 1946, Pomerantz went to Germany and led the prosecution of German industrialists for collaborating in Nazi war crimes, as U. S. Deputy Chief Counsel in charge of the industrialist cases. In this role, he proposed prosecuting corporations in their corporate capacity, a proposal that was rejected for pragmatic reasons. "Eight months later, he left Germany after accusing the Truman Administration of not really wanting to pursue the trials."

=== Coplon Case ===
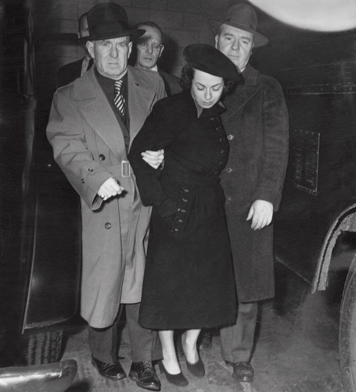
Pomerantz defended Valentin A. Gubitchev, accomplice of Judith Coplon (here, arrested by FBI agents on 4 March 1949)

In 1949, Pomerantz defended Valentin A. Gubitchev, a Soviet diplomat accused of having conspired with Judith Coplon, a Department of Justice analyst, to funnel defense secrets to the Soviet Union. Pomerantz countered the government prosecutor's closing arguments with a different interpretation of their circuitous meetings–as not espionage but romance. Gubitchev, he argued, was a married man with children, a "crazy, crazy man" torn by romantic loyalties. Coplon's attorney Archibald Palmer also portrayed the relationship as romantic. In 1950, Gubitchev and Coplon were convicted in 1950 and received 15-year sentences. However, Gubitchev received a reprieve on condition he leave the country, while Coplon was freed on bail. 16 years later the indictment was dropped by the Justice Department.

== Alleged communism ==
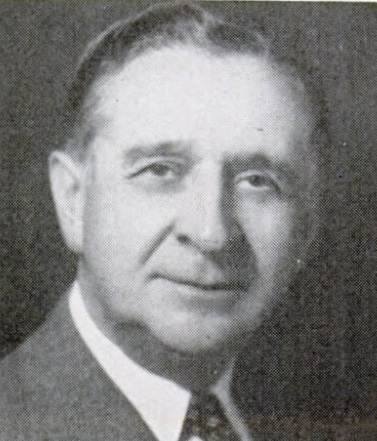
US Representative George Anthony Dondero (here from 1953 Pocket Congressional Directory of the 83rd Congress) accused Pomerantz of Communism

On July 9, 1947, US Representative George Anthony Dondero named Pomerantz while publicly questioned the "fitness" of United States Secretary of War Robert P. Patterson for failing to ferret out Communist infiltrators in his department. Dondero cited Pomerantz for denouncing President Truman's loyalty purge, and addressing a Communist-controlled organization.

Dondero's speech on the House floor asserted that Patterson had not shown the ability to "fathom the wiles of the international Communist conspiracy" and to counteract them with "competent personnel". Dondero cited ten government personnel in the War Department who had Communist backgrounds or leanings: Colonel Bernard Bernstein, Russell A. Nixon, Abraham L. Pomerantz, Josiah E. DuBois Jr., Richard Sasuly, George Shaw Wheeler, Heinz Norden, Max Lowenthal, and Allan Rosenberg (member of Lowenthal's staff). Dondero stated, "It is with considerable regret that I am forced to the conclusion the Secretary Patterson falls short of these standards."

== Personal life and death ==
Pomerantz married Phyllis Cohen; they had two children, Charlotte Pomerantz (who married Carl Marzani) and Daniel Pomerantz.

In 1974, Pomerantz joined a new formed Committee on Qualifications to Practice before the United States Courts in the Second Circuit, announced by Irving R. Kaufman, chaired by Robert L. Clare Jr., with Robert D. Lipscher as secretary and including: Frederick van Pelt Bryan, Simon H. Rifkind, David W. Peck, Paul J. Curran, Joseph McLaughlin, Maurice Rosenberg, Howard Greenberger, Robert Courtney Jr., Osmer Fitts, Samuel Gates, Paul C. Gouldin, John D. Kelly, George S. Leisure Jr., and Leon Silverman.

Abraham Pomerantz died age 79 on November 20, 1982, in New York City.

== Legacy ==
The law firm of Pomerantz LLP provides some continuing support for the Abraham L.Pomerantz Lecture series, of which two lectures have been held between 2009 and 2013 at the Brooklyn Law School. The lecture series focuses on topics of corporate securities law and related issues of professional responsibility.

== Works ==
- "Point of View" (1971)
- "Letters to the Editor" (1974)
- "Letters to the Editor" (1975)
