= Heinz Norden =

Heinz Norden (born London, 1905, died London, 1978 from injuries sustained in hit-and-run traffic accident) was an author, translator, tenant rights leader, and editor of Heute. An early victim of post-World War II anti-communist hysteria, he won a lawsuit against the U.S. Army in the U.S. Supreme Court before he emigrated to England. He was influential in the peace movement during the Vietnam War.

== Early life ==
Norden was born in England to parents who were German non-practicing Jews. They sent him back to Germany to receive a gymnasium education, partly because anti-German sentiment on the eve of World War I made it inadvisable for their children to remain in England. After the war, Heinz emigrated to the United States at age 19 accompanied by his sister, Ruth. He attended the University of Chicago and later moved to New York City.

== Housing rights movement ==
Norden became active in the New York City Tenant Housing Rights Movement, first as executive secretary to Donelan Phillips (an African American who came to prominence in the Harlem tenant protests of this same period), president of the Citywide Coalition, a housing activist league that was powerful in the early 1930s, then as a Civil Service member of Mayor Fiorello LaGuardia's City Housing Authority.

== Publishing career ==
During this same period Norden became a small success as a publisher of Little Blue Books, which was a small press publisher of various biographies and condensed version of popular literature. Among the authors Norden translated and brought to print in approachable versions to the American public were Goethe, Thomas Mann and Albert Einstein. In 1939 Norden translated The New Inquisition by European journalist Konrad Heiden, Modern Age, New York, which was one of the earliest and most lucid accounts providing the chronology of escalating torture and disenfranchisement of German Jews to appear in documented form before the general population in America.

Norden enlisted immediately upon President Franklin D. Roosevelt declaring war on Japan and Germany, and due to his fluency in German worked in U.S. Military Intelligence reaching the rank of Major in the Army with an intelligence service grade of G2. After the war during American occupation in Germany, Norden became editor in chief of Heute, the U.S. occupation magazine. In Heute's 15 September 1947, edition, Norden provided "We, the People" a three-page condensed and illustrated version of the American Constitution, this was supplemented with a full translation, under Norden's direction by two of his ablest German staff translators Peter Fischer and Fortunat Weigel, of the U.S. Constitution and Amendments that was provided free in pamphlet form to the thousands that requested it. This proved to be an influential and perhaps historically critical act as it was learned that existing translations of the U.S. Constitution in circulation up to that time in Germany contained gross misinformation and errors. During a period of east–west tensions between the Soviet Union and the United States there were many in the U.S. State Department who felt that this work was of tremendous benefit and importance to the West German government.

== Early blacklist ==
George A. Dondero, Republican, Representative from Michigan, levied charges that "as a known tenant activist in New York City" Heinz Norden was, "of questionable character.". On 9 July 1947, Dondero included Norden when publicly questioning the "fitness" of United States Secretary of War Robert P. Patterson for failing to ferret out Communist infiltrators in his department. The cause for concern arose from what Dondero called Patterson's lack of ability to "fathom the wiles of the international Communist conspiracy" and to counteract them with "competent personnel." Dondero cited ten government personnel in the War Department who had Communist backgrounds or leanings:

- Colonel Bernard Bernstein
- Russel A. Nixon
- Abraham L. Pomerantz
- Josiah E. DuBois Jr.
- Richard Sasuly
- George Shaw Wheeler
- Heinz Norden
- Max Lowenthal
- Allen Rosenberg (member of Lowenthal's staff)

Dondero stated, "It is with considerable regret that I am forced to the conclusion the Secretary Patterson falls short of these standards."

Norden was not fired as a result of Representative Dondero's charges (Dondero is today best remembered for his sincerely held theory that Abstract Expressionist Art was a Russian plot to muddle the reasoning capacity of Americans). But, the controversy averse U.S. Army did not renew Norden's contract when it came up for renewal. In Correspondence dated 29 December 1947, Norden cites General Lucius D. Clay, Commander of the U.S. Military Government as stating that the results of a loyalty board's investigation of Dondero's charges that Norden has Communist sympathies is not sustained in any way by the facts examined in their investigation.

On 1 April 1949, Federal Judge Jennings Baily ruled that Heinz Norden had been dismissed illegally from his job as editor of Heute. Shortly thereafter, Norden's translation of Doctors of infamy, by Alexander Mitscherlich and Fred Mielke, NY, Henry Schuman publisher, won praise and caused horror as it detailed the depraved inhumanity of the Nazi doctors charged with "Human Degradation by Decree" during the Nuremberg Trials. During that year Heinz Norden worked up an unpublished manuscript, "How I Overthrew the FB & I." In 1950 it was not a hospitable environment for such literature to find a publisher as the United States was now engaged in a new war in North Korea.

== Personal life ==
After arriving in America he met and married Helen Ovenden, divorcing in 1926.

Soon after moving to New York, he met and married another aspiring writer like himself: Helen Strough Brown (later author under the name of Helen Lawrenson, longtime editor of Vanity Fair for Conde Nast). They settled in Greenwich Village where Heinz earned money as an advertising copywriter until the Wall Street crash of 1929 left him without a steady job surviving on his guitar playing in Village clubs at night. Brown and Norden soon separated and went on separate paths.

Norden married violinist Clair Harper in 1944 and remained married to her until his death. The couple produced a daughter, Barbara (b. 1947). They moved to England in 1961.

== Works translated by Heinz Norden ==
- Konrad Heiden: The New Inquisition. Introduction Hendrik an Loon. Published jointly Modern Ages with Alliance Book Corporation. New York 1939.
- Alexander Mitscherlich and Fred Mielke, Doctors of infamy. The story of the Nazi medical crimes, translated from German by Heinz Norden. With statements of 3 American authorities identified with the Nuremberg medical trial and a note on medical ethics by Albert Deutsch, xxxix, 172 pages, Ill. with 16 pages of photographs; 8. Henry Schuman, New York 1949
