= Doctors of Infamy =

Non-fiction work by Alexander Mitscherlich

Doctors of Infamy: The Story of the Nazi Medical Crimes
- Author: Alexander Mitscherlich; Fred Mielke
- Language: English
- Genre: Non-fiction
- Publication date: 1947

Doctors of Infamy: The Story of the Nazi Medical Crimes (1947), published in the U.K. as The Death Doctors, is a book by Alexander Mitscherlich and Fred Mielke which begins with a statement on the intention of its publication and includes a documentation of the Doctors' Trial in Nuremberg that was held from 9 December 1946 until 20 August 1947.

Mitscherlich and Mielke were official observers at the Doctor's trial for the West German Chambers of Physicians.

In Germany, the first edition appeared in 1947. It was the interim report of the umbrella organization of doctors' associations in Western Germany who had sent out a commission of six observers to the Nuremberg trials. This commission was headed by young Mitscherlich because none of the established colleagues would have taken on this task in their own name. In this initial copy they accused Ferdinand Sauerbruch a top surgeon and Wolfgang Heubner director of the Pharmacological Institute at Berlin University of being accessories to medical crimes as they participated in a conference on the Sulfonamide experiments at Ravensbrück concentration camp, these experiments were extremely cruel and partially fatal. Mitscherlich was then sued by Sauerbruch and Heubner and so this portion of the book was removed from subsequent editions.

The 1949 the final edition was published, ten thousand copies were printed exclusively for the West German Chambers of Physicians, it did not become known to the public. There were no reviews of the book. It let to Mitscherlich quip 'it was as if the book had never been written'. But the World Medical Association received a copy and accepted it as proof that the medical profession in Germany was distancing itself from Nazi Crimes and so allowed Germany to rejoin the WMA.

From 1960 onwards the book was made available in German in a paperback edition. For the 1977 reprint of this edition, Mitscherlich wrote a new preface. The most recent edition is the 18th impression of 2012.

== Editions ==
- Mitscherlich A, Mielke F (1949). Doctors of infamy. The story of the Nazi medical crimes. Translated from German. Translated by Heinz Norden. New York: Henry Schuman. With statements of 3 American authorities identified with the Nuremberg medical trial and a note on medical ethics by Albert Deutsch, xxxix, 172 pages, Ill. with 16 pages of photographs; 8.

Previous editions in German

- Mitscherlich A, Mielke F (1947). Das Diktat der Menschenverachtung. Der Nürnberger Ärzteprozeß und seine Quellen. Heidelberg: Lambert Schneider. p. 175.
- Mitscherlich A, Mielke F, eds. (1949). Wissenschaft ohne Menschlichkeit. Medizinische und Eugenische Irrwege unter Diktatur, Bürokratie und Krieg. Heidelberg: Lambert Schneider.

1960 paperback edition in German

- Mitscherlich A, ed. (1978). Medizin ohne Menschlichkeit : Dokumente des Nürnberger Aerzteprozesses. Frankfurt am Main: Fischer Taschenbuch Verlag. ISBN 978-3-596-22003-8.; in 1977, Alexander Mitscherlich contributed a new preface (alone, since his colleague Fred Mielke had died in 1959); most recent edition: Medizin ohne Menschlichkeit : Dokumente des Nürnberger Aerzteprozesses (18th ed.). Frankfurt am Main: Fischer Taschenbuch Verlag. 2012. ISBN 978-3-596-22003-8.

== Literature ==
- (About the English edition, in German) Brandel J (February 1949). "Das Diktat der Menschenverachtung. Deutsche Aerzte versuchen ein amerikanisches Buch gegen Nazi-Aerzte zu verhindern" [The dictate of misanthropy. German doctors are trying to prevent an American book against Nazi doctors]. Aufbau (in German). 15 (7): 19, columns a–c.
