= Martha Griffiths =

American politician (1912–2003)

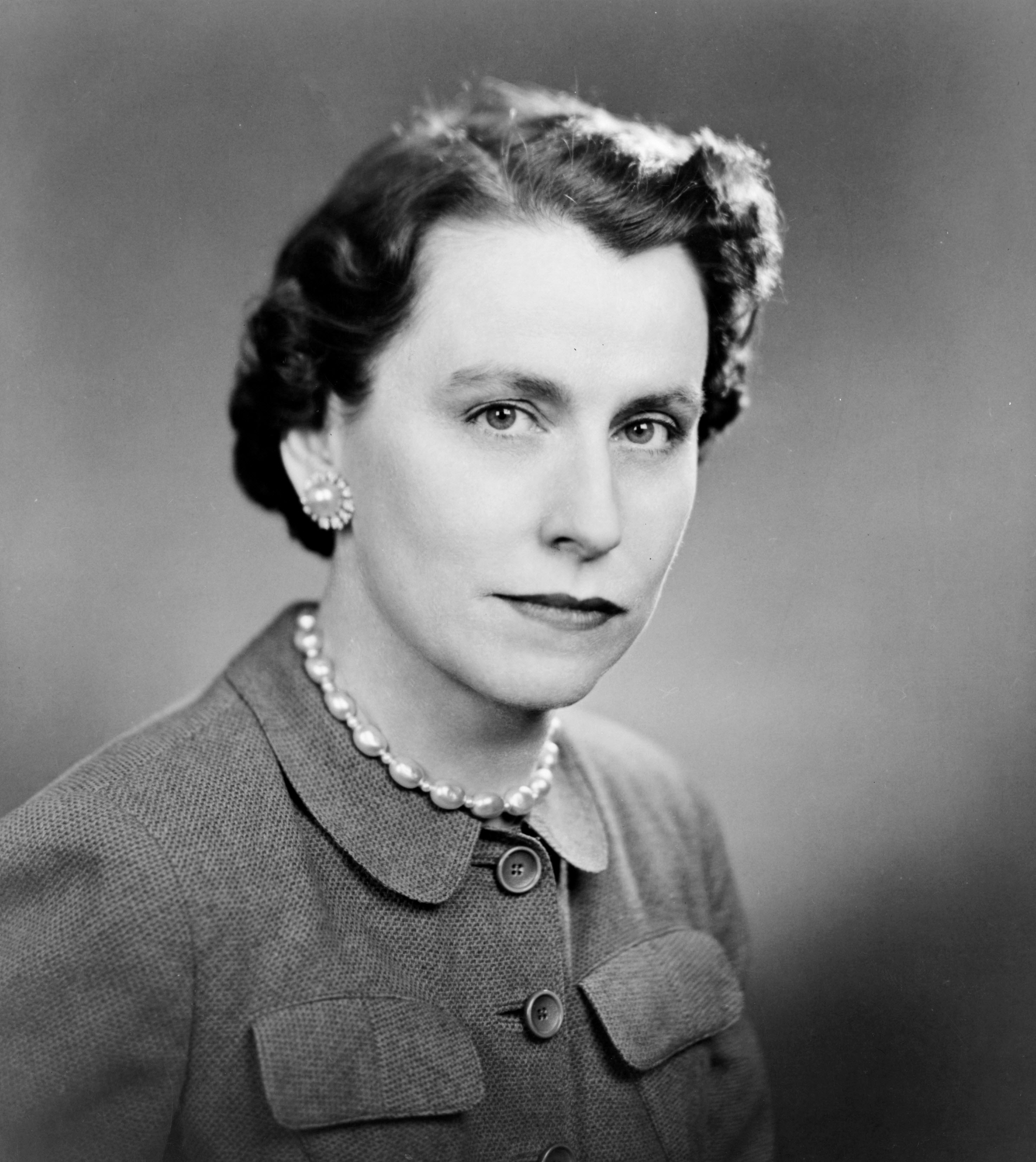

59th Lieutenant Governor of Michigan
- In office January 1, 1983 – January 1, 1991
- Governor: James Blanchard
- Preceded by: James Brickley
- Succeeded by: Connie Binsfeld

Member of the U.S. House of Representatives from Michigan's 17th district
- In office January 3, 1955 – December 31, 1974
- Preceded by: Charles Oakman
- Succeeded by: William Brodhead

Personal details
- Born: Martha Edna Wright; January 29, 1912 Pierce City, Missouri, U.S.
- Died: April 22, 2003 (aged 91) Armada, Michigan, U.S.
- Party: Democratic
- Spouse: Hicks Griffiths (m. 1933; died 1996)
- Education: University of Missouri, Columbia (BA); University of Michigan, Ann Arbor (LLB)

Martha Wright Griffiths (January 29, 1912 – April 22, 2003) was an American lawyer and judge before being elected to the United States House of Representatives in 1954. Griffiths was the first woman to serve on the House Committee on Ways and Means and the first woman elected to the United States Congress from Michigan as a member of the Democratic Party. She was "instrumental" in including the prohibition of sex discrimination under Title VII of the Civil Rights Act of 1964. In 1982, Griffiths was also the first woman elected lieutenant governor of Michigan, as Matilda Dodge Wilson had been appointed the first female lieutenant governor of Michigan in 1939.

== Life and career ==
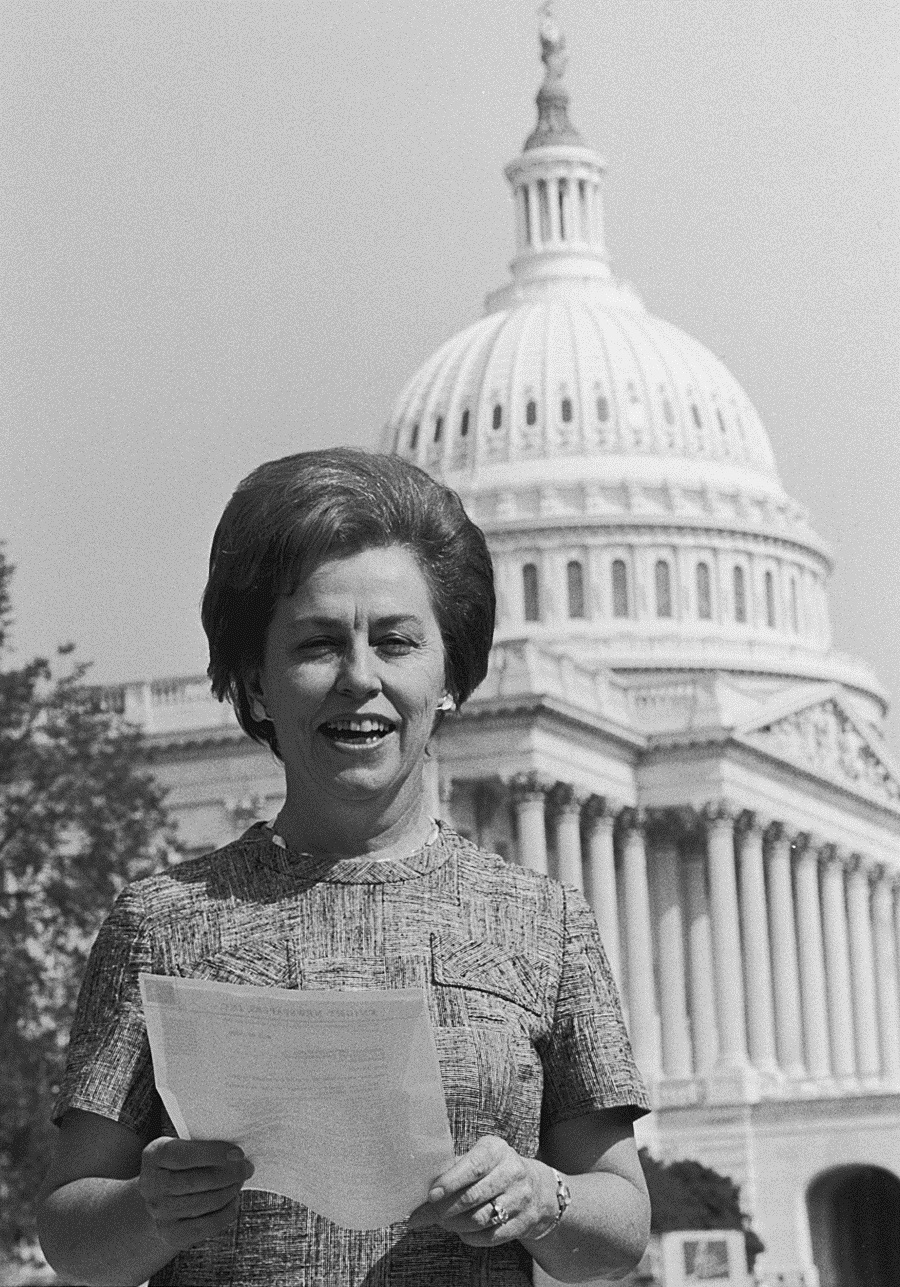
Representative Martha Griffiths in 1970

Martha Edna Wright was born in Pierce City, Missouri. She attended public schools and went on to graduate with a B.A. from the University of Missouri in 1934. She chose to continue her education by studying law and graduated from the University of Michigan Law School in 1940. She married Hicks George Griffiths (July 9, 1940 – March 4, 1996), a lawyer and a judge as well as chairman of the Michigan Democratic Party from 1949 to 1950.

She worked as a lawyer in private practice, then in the legal department of the American Automobile Insurance Co. in Detroit from 1941 to 1942 and then as the Ordnance District contract negotiator from 1942 to 1946. She was elected to the Michigan House of Representatives, serving from 1949 to 1953 for the Wayne County 1st district. In 1953, she was appointed as recorder and judge of the Recorder's Court in Detroit and sat as judge from 1953 to 1954, the first woman to do so.

In 1954, Griffiths was elected as a Democrat from Michigan's 17th congressional district to the 84th Congress and was subsequently re-elected to the nine following Congresses, serving from January 3, 1955, to December 31, 1974, in the U.S. House. She sat as a delegate at the Democratic National Convention in 1956 as well as in 1968. She was not a candidate for re-election to the 94th Congress in 1974.

== Major legislation ==
=== Equal Rights Amendment ===
During her time in Congress, Griffiths sponsored the Equal Rights Amendment, one of 33 proposed amendments to pass in Congress and be sent to the states for ratification, and among the six that were not ratified.

The Guardian described her as "the mother of the Equal Rights Amendment", adding:

The weapons she deployed during her 10-term congressional career included implacable determination, a lawyer's grasp of procedural niceties, and a tongue like a blacksmith's rasp.

=== Humane Slaughter Act ===
In 1955, Griffiths introduced the first version of the federal Humane Slaughter Act alongside Senator Hubert Humphrey. The law sought to prohibit the shackling and hoisting of conscious animals and the use of sledgehammers for stunning. A version of the law sponsored by Griffiths and Representative William R. Poage was enacted in 1958.

== Quote ==
"I don't know really that I have so much perseverance as I do a sense of indignity at the fact that women are not justly treated. I have the same sort of feeling for Blacks, Latinos and the Asiatics. If we are America, then we ought to be what we say we are. We ought to be the land of the free and the brave. What people sought in this land was justice."
"Some of that I get from my father. I adored my father. My father thought that girls were smarter than boys, which was unusual in my day and age."

== Post-Congressional career as lieutenant governor ==
After her congressional service, Griffiths returned to the practice of law and then served as the 59th lieutenant governor of Michigan from 1983 to 1991 on the ticket of Governor James Blanchard. She was inducted into the Michigan Women's Hall of Fame in 1983 and to the National Women's Hall of Fame a decade later in 1993. She retired to her home in Armada, Michigan, where she lived until her death in 2003 at age 91.

Martha Griffiths was a member of the American Association of University Women. The AAUW of Michigan named its "Martha Griffiths Equity Award" in her honor.

== See also ==
- List of female lieutenant governors in the United States
- Women in the United States House of Representatives

U.S. House of Representatives
Preceded by Charles Oakman	Member of the U.S. House of Representatives from Michigan's 17th congressional district 1955–1974	Succeeded by William Brodhead
New office	Chair of the House Beauty Shop Committee; 1967–1975	Succeeded by Yvonne Burke
Party political offices
Preceded by Mike Mansfield	Response to the State of the Union address 1972; Served alongside: Carl Albert, Lloyd Bentsen, Hale Boggs, John Brademas, Frank Church, Thomas Eagleton, John Melcher, Ralph Metcalfe, William Proxmire, Leonor Sullivan	Vacant Title next held by Mike Mansfield
Preceded by Olivia Maynard	Democratic nominee for Lieutenant Governor of Michigan; 1982, 1986	Succeeded by Olivia Maynard
Political offices
Preceded by James Brickley	Lieutenant Governor of Michigan; 1983–1991	Succeeded by Connie Binsfeld
