= Charles G. Oakman =

American politician

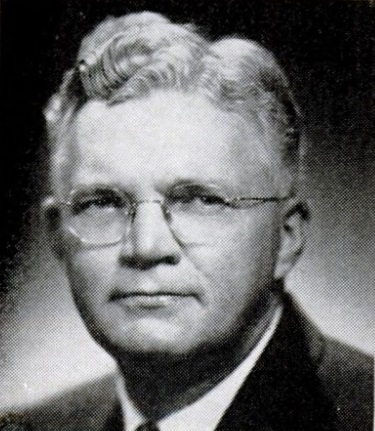
- From 1953's Pocket Congressional Directory of the 83rd Congress

Member of the U.S. House of Representatives from Michigan's 17th district
- In office January 3, 1953 – January 3, 1955
- Preceded by: George Anthony Dondero
- Succeeded by: Martha Griffiths

Personal details
- Born: Charles Gibb Oakman; September 4, 1903 Detroit, Michigan, U.S.
- Died: October 28, 1973 (aged 70) Dearborn, Michigan, U.S.
- Resting place: Roseland Park Cemetery of Berkley, Michigan
- Party: Republican
- Education: Wayne State University; University of Michigan

Charles Gibb Oakman (September 4, 1903 – October 28, 1973) was an American businessman and politician who served one term as a U.S. representative from Michigan from 1953 to 1955.

== Biography ==
Oakman was born in Detroit, Michigan; attended the public schools and Wayne State University. He graduated from the University of Michigan at Ann Arbor in 1926 and engaged in the real estate and transportation business from 1927 to 1940.

=== Early political career ===
He was also a member of the Wayne County Board of Supervisors from 1941 to 1952. He also served as executive secretary to the mayor of Detroit in 1941 and 1942, and as city controller from 1942 to 1945. He then served four terms as city councilman from 1947 to 1952, and as secretary of the Detroit-Wayne Joint Building Authority from 1948 to 1954. He was general manager from 1955 to 1973.

=== Congress ===
In 1952, Oakman defeated Democrat Martha W. Griffiths to be elected as a Republican from Michigan's 17th congressional district to the 83rd Congress, serving from January 3, 1953, to January 3, 1955, in the U.S. House. He was an unsuccessful candidate for reelection in 1954 to the 84th Congress, losing to Griffiths in a rematch.

On February 8, 1954, Oakman introduced a bill to the U.S. House that would add the words "under God" to the Pledge of Allegiance. U.S. Senator from Michigan Homer S. Ferguson introduced the bill to the U.S. Senate. The bill became law on Flag Day, June 14, 1954.

=== Memberships and death ===
Oakman was a Presbyterian and a member of Freemasons, Knights Templar, Shriners, Elks, and Alpha Sigma Phi.

He died in Dearborn, Michigan and is interred at Roseland Park Cemetery of Berkley, Michigan.

U.S. House of Representatives
Preceded by George A. Dondero	United States Representative for the 17th Congressional District of Michigan; 1953 – 1955	Succeeded by Martha W. Griffiths
