= Michigan's 17th congressional district =

Obsolete U.S. House district

Coordinates: 42°20′N 83°15′W

- Obsolete district
- Created: 1930
- Eliminated: 1990
- Years active: 1933-1993

Michigan's 17th congressional district is an obsolete United States congressional district in Michigan. The first Representative to Congress elected from the 17th district, George Anthony Dondero, took office in 1933, after reapportionment due to the 1930 census. The district was dissolved following the 1990 census. The last Representative elected from the district, Sander M. Levin, was subsequently elected from the 12th district.

From 1982 until the districts demise it included all of Detroit west of the Southfield Freeway, Redford Township, Dearborn Heights, Southfield, Lathrup Village, Oak Park, Berkley, Royal Oak Township, Pleasant Ridge, Ferndale, Royal Oak, Huntington Woods and Clawson.

== List of representatives ==
Representative	Party	Years	Cong ress	Election history
District created March 4, 1933
George Anthony Dondero (Royal Oak)	Republican	March 4, 1933 - January 3, 1953	73rd 74th 75th 76th 77th 78th 79th 80th 81st 82nd	Elected in 1932. Re-elected in 1934. Re-elected in 1936; Re-elected in 1938. Re-elected in 1940. Re-elected in 1942. Re-elected in 1944. Re-elected in 1946. Re-elected in 1948. Re-elected in 1950. Redistricted to the 18th district.
Charles G. Oakman (Detroit)	Republican	January 3, 1953 - January 3, 1955	83rd	Elected in 1952. Lost re-election.
Martha Griffiths (Detroit)	Democratic	January 3, 1955 - December 31, 1974	84th 85th 86th 87th 88th 89th 90th 91st 92nd 93rd	Elected in 1954. Re-elected in 1956. Re-elected in 1958. Re-elected in 1960. Re-elected in 1962. Re-elected in 1964. Re-elected in 1966. Re-elected in 1968. Re-elected in 1970. Re-elected in 1972. Retired and resigned early.
Vacant		December 31, 1974 – January 3, 1975	93rd	
William M. Brodhead (Detroit)	Democratic	January 3, 1975 - January 3, 1983	94th 95th 96th 97th	Elected in 1974. Re-elected in 1976. Re-elected in 1978. Re-elected in 1980. Retired.
Sander Levin (Huntington Woods)	Democratic	January 3, 1983 - January 3, 1993	98th 99th 100th 101st 102nd	Elected in 1982. Re-elected in 1984. Re-elected in 1986. Re-elected in 1988. Re-elected in 1990. Redistricted to the 12th district.
District eliminated January 3, 1993
