= William M. Brodhead =

American politician (born 1941)

Bill Brodhead
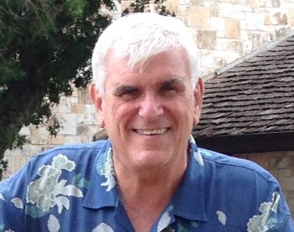

Member of the U.S. House of Representatives from Michigan's 17th district
- In office January 3, 1975 – January 3, 1983
- Preceded by: Martha Griffiths
- Succeeded by: Sander Levin

Member of the Michigan House of Representatives
- In office January 13, 1971 – January 8, 1975
- Preceded by: Weldon Yeager
- Succeeded by: Jack Legel
- Constituency: 17th district (1971–1973); 2nd district (1973–1975)

Personal details
- Born: William McNulty Brodhead; September 12, 1941 (age 84) Cleveland, Ohio, U.S.
- Party: Democratic
- Spouse: Kathleen
- Children: 2
- Education: Wayne State University (BA); University of Michigan (JD)

William McNulty Brodhead (born September 12, 1941) is an American lawyer and former politician from Michigan who served four terms in the United States House of Representatives from 1975 to 1983.

== Early life and education ==
Brodhead was born in Cleveland, Ohio and attended elementary and secondary schools in Cleveland. He received a B.A. from Wayne State University in Detroit in 1965 and a J.D. from the University of Michigan Law School, Ann Arbor, in 1967.

== Legal career and politics ==
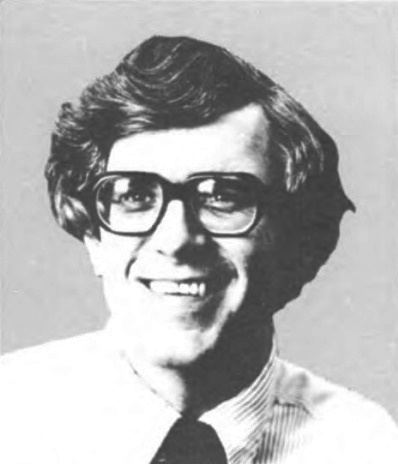
Brodhead during his final term in congress.

He was admitted to the Michigan Bar in 1968 and commenced practice in Detroit. He was elected to Michigan House of Representatives in 1970 and was reelected in 1972, from a district in Detroit.

=== Congress ===
In 1974, Martha W. Griffiths, Democratic incumbent for Michigan's 17th District to the United States House of Representatives was not a candidate for renomination. Brodhead won nomination as the Democratic candidate and was elected to the Ninety-fourth and to the three succeeding Congresses, serving from January 3, 1975 to January 3, 1983. While in Congress, Brodhead served on the House Ways and Means Committee and on the Budget Committee. Brodhead also served as Chair of the Democratic Study Group which was then the liberal caucus in the House.

== Post-political career ==
He declined to run for reelection in 1982 and returned home to the Detroit area.

He became a partner in the Detroit law firm, Plunkett & Cooney, where he practiced from 1983 to 2003. Retiring from the law firm in October, 2003, he practiced on his own until 2006, when he retired completely.

While in law practice in Detroit, Brodhead served on many non-profit boards including Detroit Public Television, Mt. Carmel Hospital, Michigan's Children and the Citizen's Research Council. He served at various times as Board Chair of the Skillman Foundation, Covenant House Michigan, Focus:Hope and the Oakland Mediation Center.

=== Senate campaign ===
In 1994, he was an unsuccessful candidate for U.S. Senator, losing in the primary to Bob Carr, who went on to lose in the general election to Spencer Abraham.

== Personal life ==
Brodhead now lives with his wife Kathleen, to whom he has been married since 1965, in Northern California. They have two adult children and a granddaughter who also live in Northern California. He has served on the board of directors of Covenant House, California.

U.S. House of Representatives
Preceded by Martha Griffiths	Member of the U.S. House of Representatives from Michigan's 17th congressional district 1975–1983	Succeeded by Sander Levin
U.S. order of precedence (ceremonial)
Preceded by Russ Carnahan as Former U.S. Representative	Order of precedence of the United States as Former U.S. Representative	Succeeded by Lynn Rivers as Former U.S. Representative
