= NSC Working Group on South Vietnam =

The National Security Council Working Group on South Vietnam/Southeast Asia was founded in the wake of the election Lyndon B. Johnson's election campaign against Barry Goldwater to explore the different options LBJ could take in Vietnam. William Bundy would later note that this group was "'the most comprehensive' Vietnam policy review 'of any in the Kennedy and Johnson Administrations.'"

== Background to the Working Group ==
Nikita Khrushchev had just been overthrown on October 15, 1964, and American foreign policy experts did not know what to expect from Russia as Leonid Brezhnev and Alexei Kosygin took over the Soviet world. China had also just exploded its first nuclear device over Lop Nur. Brian VanDeMark captures the mood:

This fear [of communism]...reflected deeply rooted perceptions. Johnson and his advisers viewed China in 1964 much like Truman and his advisers had viewed Russia after World War II--as a militantly expansive force to be contained until mellowed by internal forces or external pressures.

"Until this week," LBJ noted, "Only four powers [America, Britain, Russia, and France] had entered the dangerous world of nuclear explosions...whatever their differences, all four are sober and serious states, with long experiences as major powers in the world...Communist China has no such experience." While LBJ may be correct somewhat, China viewed its primary enemy as Russia, not the United States. Time Magazine would further raise hell suggesting that, "In the Vast sweep of country from Angkor Wat to the Great Wall, from the Yellow Sea to Pamirs, Red China seeks hegemony" and Gallop polls noted China was feared more than Russia. The world had become an ideological battleground where one was either for or against communism—no room for middle ground. LBJ was afraid of losing Vietnam as Truman had lost China. Johnson said:

I knew Harry Truman and Dean Acheson had lost their effectiveness from the day that the Communists took over in China. I believed that the loss of China had played a large role in the rise of Joe McCarthy. And I knew that all these problems, taken together, were chickenshit compared with what might happen if we lost Vietnam

== The Working Group ==
Heading up the working group was William Bundy (Brother of McGeorge Bundy). Director of the [Pentagon]'s military assistance program to Saigon from 1961–1964, he was at the apex of most Vietnam decisions. Bundy hoped for the best, but realized the best was not always feasible in Vietnam. The representative from the Joint Chiefs of Staff, Vice Admiral Lloyd Mustin, was much more certain America could and should win a battle in North Vietnam. The two men's differing points of view were synthesized by John McNaughton, a personal representative of Robert McNamara in the working group, who called from "translating the facets of a problem [namely the Vietnam War] into statistical probabilities in order to facilitate precise, objective decisions." McNaughton came to the view that "progress inside SVN [South Vietnam was] important...[but] unlikely despite our best ideas and efforts..." and admitted that "Action against North Vietnam is to some extent a substitute for strengthening the government of South Vietnam."

== The Three Options ==
The group came up with three basic options for the future of American involvement in Vietnam.

- Option A: No change from previous policies.
- Option B: Immediate escalation
- Option C: Gradual escalation

McNaughton voted for option C because, in his words:

If Option C is tried and fails, [it] would still leave behind a better odor than Option A: It would demonstrate that [the] US was a 'good doctor' willing to keep promises, be tough, take risks, get bloodied, and hurt the enemy badly."

== Notes ==
=== Bibliography ===
- VanDeMark, Brian (1995). Into the Quagmire: Lyndon Johnson and the Escalation of the Vietnam War. Oxford University Press. ISBN 978-0-19-509650-7.
