= Duncan Lee =

American assistant and spy (1913–1988)

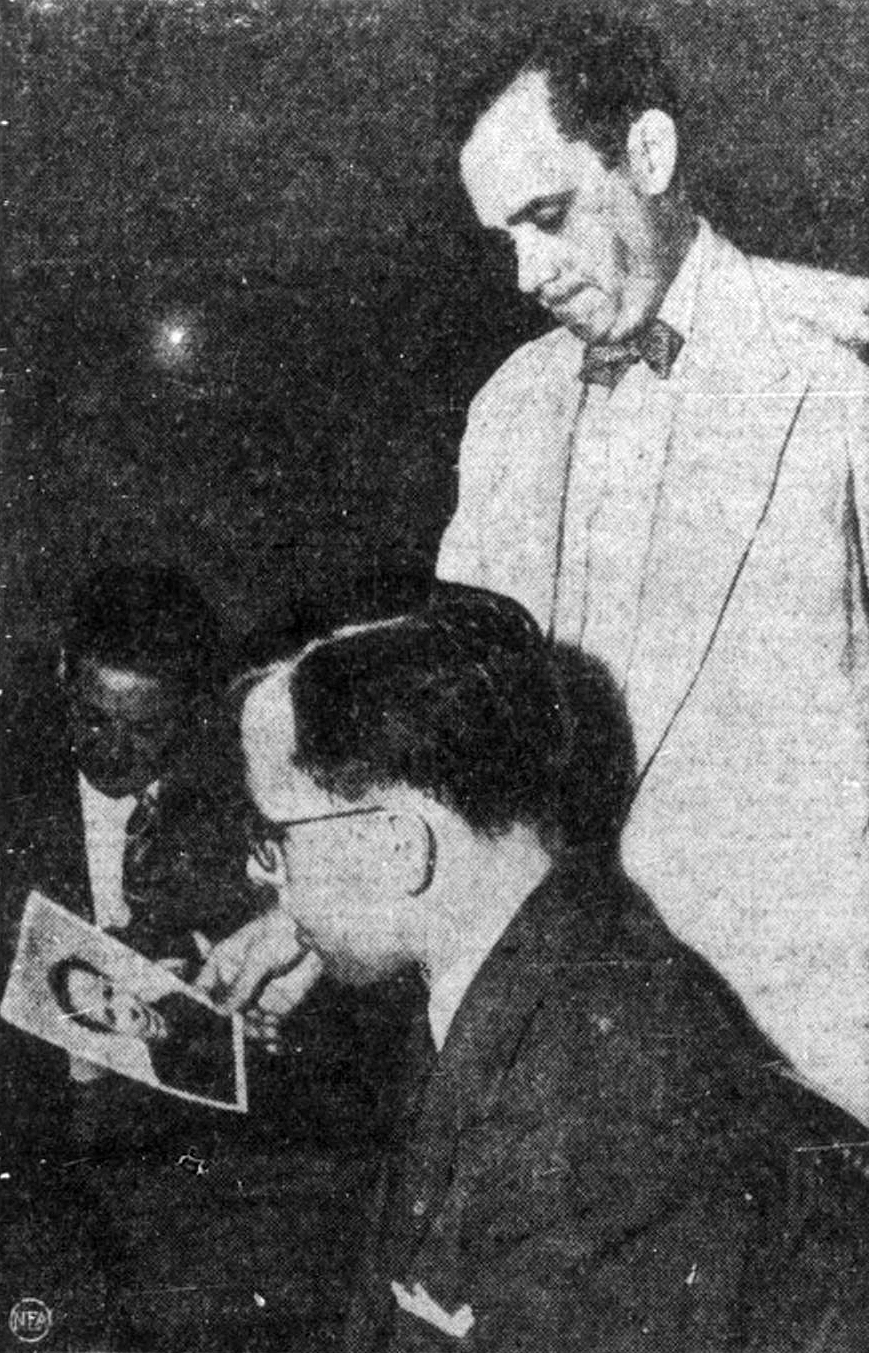
Robert E. Stripling (standing) shows Lee a picture of Jacob Golos during questioning before the House Un-American Activities Committee, 1948

Lt. Col. Duncan Chaplin Lee (1913–1988) was a confidential senior assistant to Maj. Gen. William ("Wild Bill") Donovan, founder and director of the Office of Strategic Services (OSS), World War II-era predecessor of the CIA, between 1942 and 1946. Lee was posthumously identified by the Venona project as the NKVD mole inside the OSS with the code name "Koch", making Lee the most senior alleged spy the Soviet Union is ever known to have recruited inside the U.S. intelligence community.

== Career ==
=== OSS ===
As an OSS officer, Lee served as head of the China section of SI, the Secret Intelligence Branch. While an officer, according to Soviet courier Elizabeth Bentley, Lee—reportedly a descendant of Confederate Gen. Robert E. Lee—covertly furnished her with information on "anti-Soviet work by OSS" and other topics of interest to Moscow, which was technically an ally (in Europe) following the collapse of the Nazi-Soviet pact.

In November 1944, Anatoly Gorsky reported to Moscow that according to Elizabeth Bentley, Mary Price had begun a sexual relationship with one of her sources, Duncan Chaplin Lee. "(Price) established an intimate relationship with (Lee), and she did not tell us about it until recently." Gorsky was concerned that this affair might result in Lee's cover being blown, because his wife, who was also a member of the Communist Party of the United States (CPUSA), knew about his espionage activities. "(Lee) and (Price) met in two places, at her flat and at his. The meetings were held in the presence of (Lee's) wife, who was aware of her husband's secret work." Lee's wife discovered her husband's infidelity and complained in a series of jealous scenes. The NKVD became worried about these developments and ordered Price to stop serving as Lee's handler.

Earl Browder told Iskhak Akhmerov that Price's "nerves had been badly shaken" by these events. However, as Kathryn S. Olmsted has pointed out: "Mary Price... continued the love affair, hoping that Lee would divorce his wife and marry her. Distraught over his deteriorating marriage, the pressures of the love affair, and intensified security probes at the OSS, Duncan Lee, by late 1944, had become an extremely reluctant Soviet source. Moreover, he distrusted Elizabeth Bentley, who now acted as his primary courier and contact with Soviet intelligence."

As Bentley told the FBI when she defected in 1945, she transferred this information to her Soviet handlers.

=== HUAC ===
In her August 1948 appearance before the House Committee on Un-American Activities (HUAC), Bentley testified that Lee furnished her "various types of information", which she then passed on to Soviet intelligence, including, in Bentley's words, details on "whether the OSS had spotted any of our people [Communists]" in that organization. As Nazi Germany was retreating, Bentley further testified that Lee identified multiple OSS assets who he said would cause trouble for postwar Soviet domination of Eastern Europe and the Balkans. Lee also told her, she said, that "something very secret was going on" at Oak Ridge, Tennessee; a reference to the Manhattan Project.

Lee, a former Rhodes scholar who attended Oxford University with fellow OSS staffer Donald Niven Wheeler (identified in Venona as the Soviet agent operating in OSS under cover name "Izra"), repeatedly denied Bentley's allegations, under oath, but acknowledged he and his wife knew Bentley as a family friend (albeit under an assumed name) and that he had met her several times while an OSS officer in various locations, as well as with Mary Price (identified in Venona as the Soviet agent operating in the office of columnist Walter Lippmann under the code names "Dir" and "probably" "Arena"), and veteran NKVD rezident Jacob Golos, identified in Venona as Zvuk ("Sound"). Lee said he eventually realized that Bentley held "communistic" views and terminated their relationship, but never reported these meetings as regulations would seem to require.

Lee's testimony elicited from HUAC member Rep. John McDowell (R-Penn.) the comment: For the first time "since the conspiracy of Aaron Burr, a high officer of the Army has been accused publicly of the violation of the Articles of War, which he must certainly realize the penalties and the punishment." Lee was in fact never indicted much less convicted of perjury or any other crime despite the accusations of his former handler Elizabeth Bentley. According to Bentley, Lee refused to meet with her in the presence of others while divulging classified information to her and refused to give her any classified documents; there was as a consequence virtually no credible evidence to corroborate Bentley's accusations. Bentley herself was not always an effective witness. Only one of the dozens of Soviet spies she denounced was ever convicted of any crime arising out of her accusations and only a few were even prosecuted. Many freely admitted their espionage in public hearings once the statute of limitations had run out, and most of those she named were independently proved guilty by the testimony of other eyewitnesses and eventually by the Venona files.

=== Venona Project and Soviet Archives ===
The Venona project decrypts that refer to Koch only confirm that Bentley passed on to Moscow the information she claimed to have received from Lee and do not in themselves provide independent evidence to corroborate Bentley's accusation that Lee was the source of that information. A 1944 Venona decrypt confirms that Lee tipped off Bentley about Donovan sending him on a secret mission to China.

According to the Moynihan Commission, "It would ... appear from the Venona messages that Duncan Chaplin Lee, Special Assistant to OSS Director William J. Donovan, was a Soviet agent."

In a review of Mark A. Bradley's 2014 book A Very Principled Boy, Pete Finn, national security editor at The Washington Post, noted that Lee's insistence on passing on intelligence only orally helped him escape prosecution, "But the 1995 declassification of decrypted wartime Soviet cables and the release of the notebooks of a former KGB officer who copied sections of Lee's file in Moscow left little doubt that the blue-blooded Virginian had betrayed his country."

=== After OSS ===
Lee went on to have a successful career as a lawyer in the private sector. Lee continued to represent clients such as Claire Chennault and Whiting Willaurer. In 1949, following the fall of China to the communists, Lee represented a CIA-front company in the Hong Kong and UK courts in a successful effort to keep a large fleet of transport aircraft in Hong Kong, once owned by the Nationalist Chinese government, from being seized by the new communist Chinese regime after its recognition by the British. Lee joined insurance giant American International Group in 1953, rising to serve as AIG's chief in-house lawyer in New York City prior to his retirement in 1974.

== Personal life and death ==
Lee subsequently moved to Toronto with his Canadian wife, Frances Lee Smith, where he died in 1988.

== External sources ==
- Bradley, Mark A. (29 April 2014). A Very Principled Boy: The Life of Duncan Lee, Red Spy and Cold Warrior. Basic Books. ISBN 9780465036653.
- Allen Weinstein and Alexander Vassiliev, The Haunted Wood: Soviet Espionage in America—The Stalin Era (Random House, 1998)
- Testimony of Duncan C. Lee, U.S. Congress. House. "Hearings Regarding Communist Espionage in the U.S. Government", 80th Congress, August 10, 1948.
- FBI Venona FOIA
- The Cold War International History Project (CWIHP) has the full text of former KGB agent Alexander Vassiliev's notebooks
