= William Lowell Putnam =

American lawyer (1861–1924)

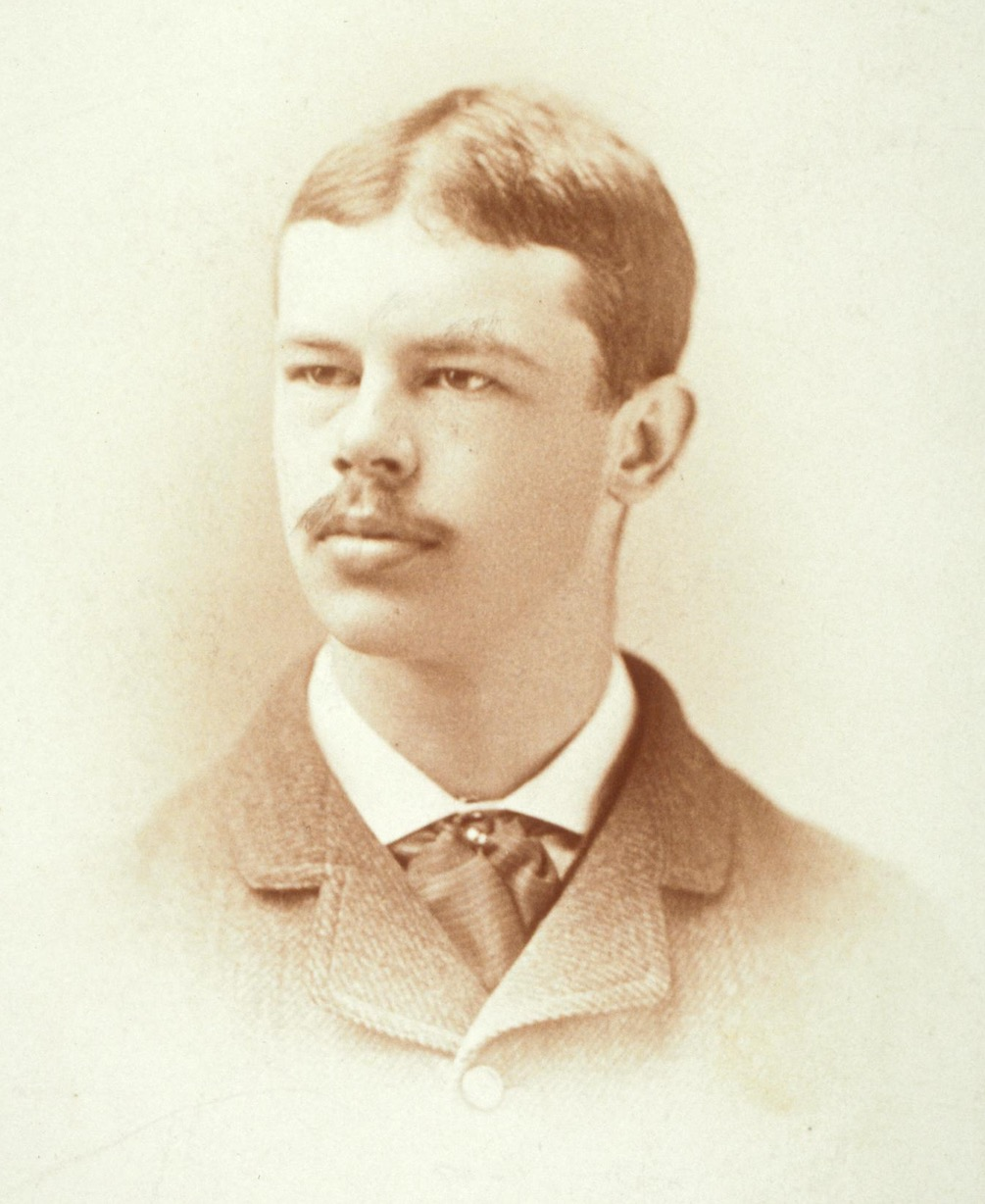
- William Lowell Putnam ca. 1880-1890
- Born: November 22, 1861
- Died: June 1924 (aged 62)
- Other name: William Putnam Sr.
- Occupations: lawyer, banker

William Lowell Putnam II (November 22, 1861 – June 1924) (more commonly known as William Putnam Sr.) was an American lawyer and banker.

== Biography ==
Putnam was the son of George and Harriet (Lowell) Putnam. He graduated from Harvard in 1882, and proceeded to make a professional name for himself in legal and financial circles. Even before his marriage to Percival Lowell's sister, Elizabeth, in 1888, Putnam (who was also Percival's half third cousin) handled a large part of the Lowell family's finances, thus leaving Augustus Lowell and Percival free to pursue their interests in science and culture. Also a successful lawyer, Putnam eventually served as the primary lawyer for both Percival Lowell and the Lowell Observatory as well as working as a partner at the well-regarded law firm of Putnam, Putnam & Bell.

Putnam's role in Lowell Observatory's history begins when Percival Lowell succumbed to severe nervous exhaustion in 1897. At this time, Putnam stepped in as the Observatory's trustee with A.E. Douglass serving as Director. Since Putnam's understanding of astronomy was minimal, he left many of the decisions about the operation of the Observatory to Douglass and contented himself with handling the Observatory's finances. As temporary trustee, he felt that it was not his place to make any dramatic changes in the Observatory's staff or location. Thus, an Observatory expedition and possibly a permanent move to South America was postponed, effectively establishing the Observatory in Flagstaff, Arizona.

Despite his conviction that he should not make any major changes to the Observatory, Putnam did become embroiled in the controversy surrounding T. J. J. See. See was employed at Lowell Observatory at that time, but was both an extremely unpopular man and regarded as a bad scientist. Three Observatory employees had already resigned due to See's poor treatment of them, and Douglass began working to remove See from the Observatory staff. Putnam, however, had to make the final decision on the matter and he was the one to tell See that he had been dismissed.

When Lowell returned to work in 1901, Putnam resumed his role as the financial and legal power behind the Observatory. He also continued his other business in Boston and New York City.

When Lowell died in 1916, Putnam was placed in charge of investing Lowell's estate for the Observatory. Putnam died in 1924, aged around 62, during Constance Lowell's attempt to contest Percival's will. Constance Lowell later asked William's son, Augustus, to become trustee. After Gus's death, William's second son, Roger, became trustee.

== Legacy ==
In 1927, Elizabeth Lowell Putnam established the William Lowell Putnam Intercollegiate Memorial Fund in order to begin a college-level mathematics competition, the William Lowell Putnam Mathematical Competition. This contest, which continues to this day, began in 1935 under the direction of the Mathematical Association of America.

Putnam's grandson by the same name, William Lowell Putnam, born 1924, was a geologist, businessman, and climber, and served as the sole trustee of Lowell observatory from 1987 to 2013.
