= William Bundy =

American lawyer and intelligence analyst (1917–2000)

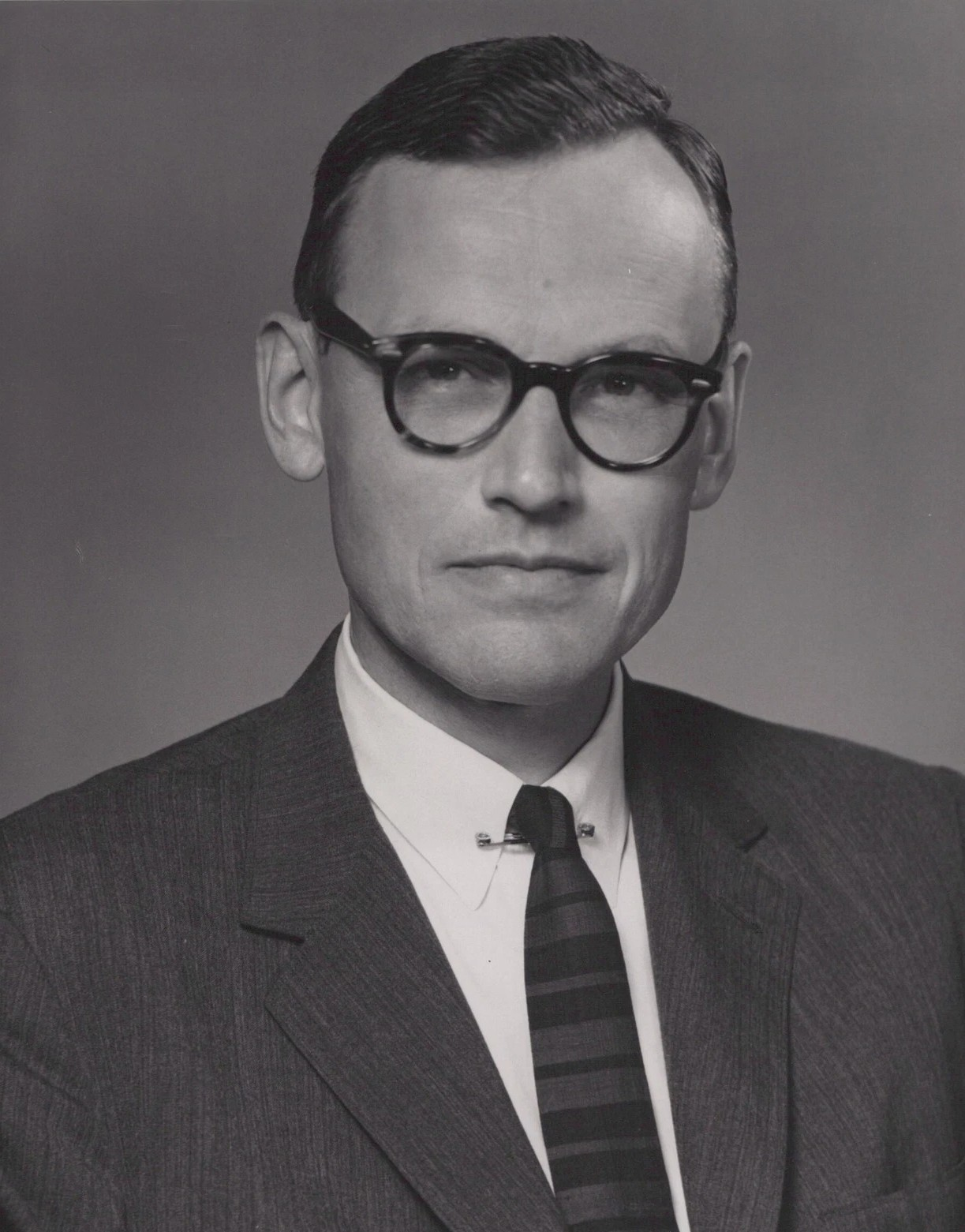
- Bundy in 1965

9th Assistant Secretary of State for East Asian and Pacific Affairs
- In office March 16, 1964 – May 4, 1969
- President: Lyndon B. Johnson
- Preceded by: Roger Hilsman
- Succeeded by: Marshall Green

Assistant Secretary of Defense for International Security Affairs
- In office November 29, 1963 – March 14, 1964
- President: Lyndon B. Johnson
- Preceded by: Paul Nitze
- Succeeded by: John McNaughton

Personal details
- Born: William Putnam Bundy; September 24, 1917 Boston, Massachusetts
- Died: October 6, 2000 (aged 83) Princeton, New Jersey
- Party: Democratic
- Spouse: Mary Acheson
- Education: Yale University; Harvard University
- Occupation: CIA analyst, attorney

William Putnam Bundy (September 24, 1917 – October 6, 2000) was an American attorney and analyst with the CIA. Bundy served as a foreign affairs advisor to both presidents John F. Kennedy and Lyndon B. Johnson. He had key roles in planning the Vietnam War, serving as deputy to Paul Nitze at Defense under Kennedy and as Assistant Secretary of State for East Asian and Pacific affairs under Johnson.

After leaving government service in 1969, Bundy served as a historian of foreign affairs, teaching at Massachusetts Institute of Technology (MIT) and at Princeton University, from 1972 to his death. His book A Tangled Web: The Making of Foreign Policy in the Nixon Presidency (1998) is considered his most important work.

== Early life and education ==
Born in 1917 and raised in Boston, Massachusetts, he came from a family long involved in Republican politics. His father, Harvey Hollister Bundy, served as an assistant secretary of state to Colonel Henry L. Stimson beginning in 1931, and later as his special assistant on atomic matters when Stimson was Secretary of War under President Franklin D. Roosevelt. Bundy as a diplomat also helped implement the Marshall Plan. Bill was raised in a highly accomplished, highly intellectual family, with a brother, McGeorge Bundy,s who was two years younger.

After attending Groton School and Yale University (where he was one of the first presidents of the Yale Political Union and a member of Skull and Bones), Bundy entered Harvard Law School. During World War II, he left to join the Army Signal Corps. In August 1943 he led the nine-man 6813th Signals Security Detachment to the UK secret code breaking Government Code and Cypher School at Bletchley Park. He and six other cryptanalysts worked in Hut 6 and the two translators worked in Hut 3. They fitted in well and he later described his time there as "the most satisfying of my career."

== Career ==
After finishing law school in 1947, Bundy joined the Washington-based law firm of Covington and Burling. While there, he contributed to Alger Hiss's defense fund in the Hiss-Chambers Case. In 1953, Senator Joseph McCarthy cited his $400 contribution. Bundy explained that Donald Hiss, Alger's brother, worked with him at Covington & Burling. Allen Dulles and Vice President Richard M. Nixon defended him, and the matter was dropped. (Bundy's father, Harvey Hollister Bundy, Sr., served as chairman of the board at Carnegie from 1953 to 1958, not long after Hiss served as president from 1946 to 1949.)

In the early 1950s, Bundy was recruited for the Central Intelligence Agency, serving as an analyst and as chief of staff for the Office of National Estimates. In 1960, Bundy took a leave of absence from the CIA to serve as staff director for Eisenhower's Commission on National Goals. During the Kennedy years, he was deputy to Assistant Secretary of Defense for International Security Affairs Paul Nitze (becoming Assistant Secretary in November 1963). He also worked for the Secretary of the Navy. During much of the LBJ era, he was Assistant Secretary of State for East Asian and Pacific affairs.

He continued to serve as an advisor on Vietnam following the election of President Richard M. Nixon, but resigned from government in 1969. Bundy moved to academia, teaching at Massachusetts Institute of Technology (MIT). In 1972 he moved to Princeton University, where he served as a professor for the rest of his life. He edited the influential journal, Foreign Affairs, of the Council on Foreign Relations from 1972 to 1984, also serving as a member of the Council. He declined an offer by the Council's chairman, David Rockefeller, to be the Council's president.

His brother, McGeorge Bundy (1919–1996), also attended Yale and was a member of Skull and Bones. After being involved in intelligence and the Council on Foreign Relations, he served from 1961 to 1966 as the National Security Advisor to both the Kennedy and Johnson administrations.

Bill Bundy was somewhat to the left of his brother politically, and was a spirited opponent of Joseph McCarthy. He was also considered one of the administration's more dovish members on Vietnam, and was an advisor to three presidents. In 1989 he acknowledged the complexity of the presidents' decisionmaking, saying, "In a nutshell, my present feeling is that it was a tragedy waiting to happen, but one made much worse by countless errors along the way, in many of which I had a part."

Bundy was Honorary American Secretary General of the Bilderberg Meetings from 1975 to 1980.

Bundy's most noted work is A Tangled Web: The Making of Foreign Policy in the Nixon Presidency (1998). His papers are held by the Seeley G. Mudd Library at Princeton University.

== Personal life and death ==
Bill Bundy married Mary Acheson, the daughter of Truman's Secretary of State Dean Acheson and his wife Alice. Bill and Mary had three children, Michael, Christopher, and Carol.

On October 6, 2000, William Putnam Bundy died at his home in Princeton, New Jersey, at the age of 83 from heart trouble.

== See also ==
- NSC Working Group on South Vietnam

Government offices
Preceded by Roger Hilsman	Assistant Secretary of State for Far Eastern Affairs / Assistant Secretary of State for East Asian and Pacific Affairs; March 16, 1964 – May 4, 1969	Succeeded by Marshall Green
