= Donald Niven Wheeler =

American activist, teacher, and alleged Soviet spy

- Born: October 23, 1913; White Bluffs, Washington
- Died: November 8, 2002 (aged 89); Seattle, Washington
- Education: Reed College
- Employer(s): Yale University; USDA; Treasury; OSS
- Spouse: Mary Lukes Vause (m. 1938)

Donald Niven Wheeler (1913–2002) was an American social activist, teacher, and Communist Party member, as well as an alleged Soviet spy.

== Background ==
Donald Niven Wheeler was born on October 23, 1913, in White Bluffs, Washington. His parents were Francis Marion Wheeler and Jeanie Melissa Shaw. He had five siblings including sister Margaret Jean Wheeler Schuddakopf and brother George Shaw Wheeler. He was a graduate of Reed College. He was a brilliant scholar who upon graduation received a Rhodes Scholarship to Oxford University, and there, spurred by what he learned through his studies in economics, he joined the university branch of the Communist Party. He did post-graduate work at the University of Paris but dropped out to join the International Brigades during the Spanish Civil War. There he met Mary Lukes Vause, a fellow graduate of Reed College, a new mother and the widow of his best friend, Clare Vause. They were married in 1938. He later returned to Oxford (1968) and completed his doctoral studies. Duncan Chaplin Lee, an Oxford classmate, described him as a really "progressive person".

== Career ==
=== Government ===
Wheeler was associated with various so-called "Comintern" organizations before being employed by the New Deal federal government, first in the United States Department of Agriculture, later the Department of Treasury. From 1941 to 1946, Wheeler was employed by the Office of Strategic Services (OSS) in Washington, D.C.

=== Communist Party USA ===
Wheeler was allegedly a member of the white collar unit of the Communist Party of the District of Columbia. Franz Neumann, who worked with him in the OSS, allegedly gave a good report to Moscow, describing him as "a calm and progressive man".

=== Perlo group ===
In November 1943, Earl Browder, Chairman of the CPUSA, turned control of the Perlo group of Soviet spies over to Jacob Golos two months before Golos's death, and the group was subsequently taken over by his girlfriend, Elizabeth Bentley.

Perlo later wrote to his Soviet supervisors of Wheeler:

He has access to excellent material and once given an explanation of what was wanted, worked hard and bravely to get it... He has not been reckless but has gotten materials regularly under security conditions more difficult than those faced by most others in the group.

According to Allen Weinstein, "Beginning in 1944, virtually the entire range of OSS analytic and planning documents on Nazi Germany and its postwar prospects flowed continuously from General Donovan's Washington headquarters through Wheeler to Pavel Fitin's offices in Moscow."

As a member of the OSS Research and Analysis Division, Wheeler had government security clearance to receive secret and confidential "ditto" copies of monthly and semi-monthly reports of political developments throughout the world. Wheeler is alleged to have passed these reports as well as handwritten and typewritten material of cable reports from the State Department and the OSS to Soviet intelligence. Wheeler is alleged to have provided information on the organization and policies of British intelligence services and furnished memoranda prepared by the Foreign Nationalities Branch of OSS on material relating to the particular racial groups and activities within the United States. These allegations, launched during McCarthyism resulted in no charges ever being brought against Wheeler, who contended that the charges of espionage were a response to his outspoken criticism of the failings of the American economic and political system.

Beginning in 1944, the entire range of OSS planning documents on the postwar occupation of Germany are alleged to have been supplied to KGB head Pavel Fitin through Wheeler. Some observers considered Wheeler the most active operative within the Perlo group, and his complicity was alleged to have been corroborated by information exhumed from the NKVD archives in the 1990s. Wheeler allegedly appears in Venona as a Soviet source under the cover name "Izra".

Wheeler continued to pass documents to the Soviet Union after the war. In November 1945 he sent information on various issues. This included a report on the Italian domestic political situation on the eve of elections in that country; a copy of the confidential report written by the military governor in the U.S. occupation zone of the USSR; OSS reports about current political events in the USSR; OSS weekly reports on political events in Europe and a State Department intelligence report on the Middle East.

=== Later life ===
In the 1950s, Wheeler became a dairy farmer in Washington state because he was unable to find teaching work. Wheeler was subpoenaed as a hostile witness before federal grand juries in Washington, D.C., and San Francisco; his pregnant wife and four children milk the cows. He was also summoned three times before the House Un-American Activities Committee; George Andersen of Gladstein, Andersen, Leonard, and Sibbett served as his legal counsel. His sister, Margaret Jean Schuddakopf, said that his courage and steadfastness was her beacon as she fought her own battle for the right to teach.

He had a long and distinguished teaching career, despite constant harassment and "blacklisting". He taught at Yale University, at Franconia College in Franconia, New Hampshire, and at Brandon University in Manitoba, Canada.

== Personal life and death ==
In 1938, Wheeler married Mary Lukes Vause, a fellow graduate of Reed College, a new mother, and the widow of his best friend, Clare Vause.

Donald Niven Wheeler died age 89 on November 8, 2002, in Seattle, Washington.

== Legacy ==
Wheeler's papers are in the archives of the University of Washington, and his library will be donated to the George A. Meyers Collection at Frostburg State University in Maryland.

== See also ==
- George Shaw Wheeler
- Wheeler (surname)
- Duncan Chaplin Lee

== External sources ==
- Harvey Klehr, John Earl Haynes, and Fridrikh Igorevich Firsov, The Secret World of American Communism (New Haven: Yale University Press, 1995)
- Allen Weinstein and Alexander Vassiliev, The Haunted Wood: Soviet Espionage in America—the Stalin Era (New York: Random House, 1999), pgs. 106, 225, 251–56, 257, 259, 261, 264, 286.
- Vassiliev, Alexander (2003), Alexander Vassiliev's Notes on Anatoly Gorsky's December 1948 Memo on Compromised American Sources and Networks

The Cold War International History Project (CWIHP) has the full text of former KGB agent Alexander Vassiliev's notebooks containing new evidence on Wheeler's cooperation with the Soviet Union.

- Frostburg: George A. Meyers Collection
- People's Word obit
- 54 Wn.2d 259, MARGARET JEAN SCHUDDAKOPF, Appellant, v. TACOMA SCHOOL DISTRICT NO. 10, Respondent
