= Judith Coplon =

American Soviet spy

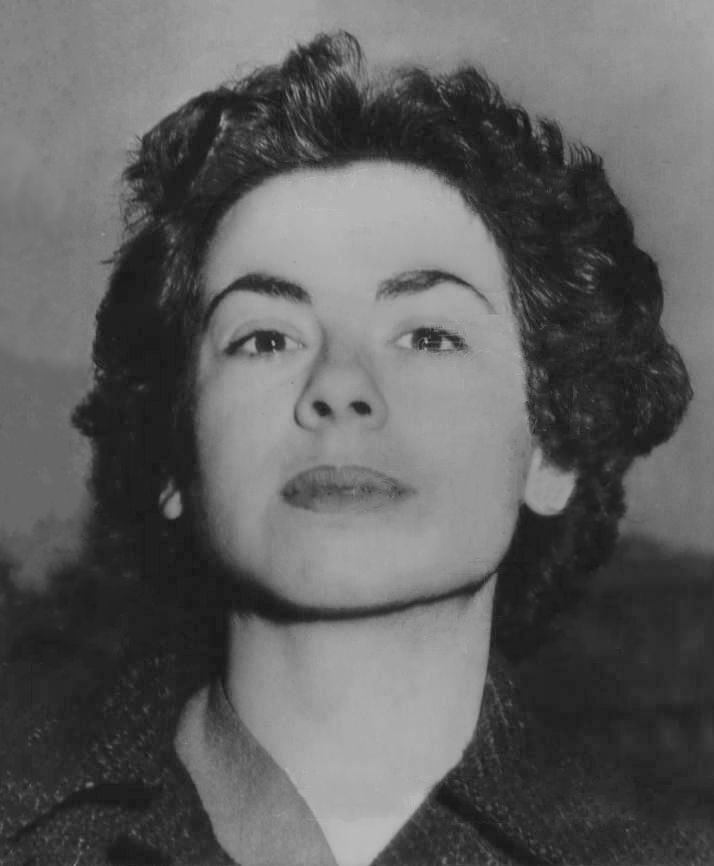
- Coplon in 1950
- Born: May 17, 1921; New York City, US
- Died: February 26, 2011 (aged 89); New York City, US
- Education: Barnard College, Columbia University
- Occupation: Analyst (U.S. Dept. of Justice)
- Spouse: Albert Socolov
- Children: 4
- Espionage activity
- Allegiance: USSR
- Service branch: NKVD
- Service years: 1945–1949 (arrest)

Judith Coplon Socolov (May 17, 1921 – February 26, 2011) was a spy for the Soviet Union whose trials, convictions, and successful constitutional appeals had a profound influence on espionage prosecutions during the Cold War.

In 1949, three major cases against alleged communists started in the United States: that of Coplon (1949–1967), that of Alger Hiss and Whittaker Chambers (1949–1950), and that of the Smith Act trials of Communist Party leaders (1949–1958).

== Background ==
Judith Coplon was born on May 17, 1921, to a Jewish family in Brooklyn, New York. Her father Samuel Coplon was a toymaker and mother Rebecca Moroh a milliner. She went to public school Joseph F. Lamb (PS 206). In high school she won a good citizenship award and a full scholarship to Barnard College. At Barnard, she majored in history and joined the Young Communist League. In 1943, she graduated cum laude.

She was recruited for Soviet espionage at Columbia University by Flora Wovschin and Marion Davis Berdecio.

== Career ==
In 1944, Coplon obtained a job in the US Department of Justice. She transferred to the Foreign Agents Registration section, where she had access to counter-intelligence information, and was allegedly recruited as a spy by the NKGB at the end of 1944.

=== Espionage ===
Evidence later emerged that Coplon was recruited as a Soviet spy during the early months of 1945. Coplon had a meeting with Vladimir Pravdin, the NKVD station chief in New York City on January 4, 1945. Pravdin was impressed by Coplon who was described as "very serious, shy, profound girl, ideologically close to us." He went on to argue:

We have no doubts about the sincerity of her desire to work with us. In the course of the conversation (Coplon) underlined how much she appreciated the credit we gave to her and that, now knowing for whom she was working, she would redouble her efforts. At the very first stage of her work (Coplon) thought she was helping the local compatriots (the CPUSA).... She thought the stuff acquired by her couldn't represent an interest to the compatriots but could for an organization like the Comintern or another institution bearing a relationship to us. She added that she hoped she was working specifically for us, since she considered it the highest honor to have an opportunity to provide us with modest help."

Soon she was recruited as a Soviet spy (codenamed Sima).

Coplon became one of the NKVD's most valued sources. Her main attention was focused on the main Justice Department counterintelligence archive that collected information from the various government agencies: FBI, OSS, and naval and army intelligence. She passed to her NKVD contact a number of documents from the archive. That included FBI materials on Soviet organizations in the United States and information on leaders of the Communist Party of the United States.

=== Detection ===
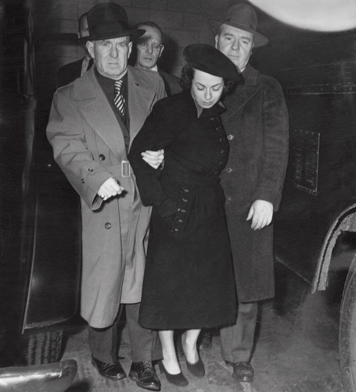
FBI arrests Judith Coplon on March 4, 1949

She came to the attention of the FBI as a result of a Venona message in late 1948. Coplon was known in both Soviet intelligence and the Venona files as "SIMA." She was the first person tried as a result of the Venona project, but for reasons of security, the Venona information was not revealed at her trial.

FBI Special Agent Robert Lamphere testified at her trial that suspicion had fallen on Coplon because of information from a reliable "confidential informant." An extensive counterintelligence operation planted a secret document for her to pass to the Soviets. FBI agents arrested Coplon on March 4, 1949, in Manhattan, as she met with Valentin Gubitchev, a KGB official employed by the United Nations while she was carrying what she believed to be secret US government documents in her purse.

=== Trials and appeals ===
Coplon's attorney was Archibald Palmer and Gubitchev's was Abraham Pomerantz.

Coplon was convicted in two separate trials, one for espionage that began on April 25, 1949 and another for conspiracy along with Gubitchev in 1950. She was sentenced to 10 years in prison. Both convictions were later overturned, in 1950 and 1951 respectively, on appeal.

The appellate court, sitting in New York, concluded that while the evidence showed that she was guilty, FBI agents had lied under oath about the bugging. Moreover, the opinion said that the failure to get a warrant was not justified. The court overturned the verdict, but the indictment was not dismissed. In the appeal of the Washington trial, the verdict was upheld, but because of the possible bugging, a new trial became impossible. For political and evidentiary reasons, it never took place. The legal irregularities ensured that she was never retried, and the government ultimately dropped the case in 1967 along with the return of her bail money of $40,000.

=== National attention ===
The Coplon trials commanded nationwide attention. After her arrest but before her trials, Coplon received earnest attention from the media.

For example, Gertrude Samuels wrote for The New York Times, questioning the situation:

Why do some people become traitors? What turns some native-born Americans, as well as naturalized citizens, into Benedict Arnolds and Quislings? What motivates them to betray their country and themselves?...

Samuels examines four kinds of traitors: professional, people loyal to their birth lands, crackpots, and idealists. In this last group, she named Elizabeth Bentley and Whittaker Chambers. To understand this group, she argues, one must understand their drive for social justice—reasons "beyond FBI jurisdiction" while "few judges are bothered by motivations." NYT Book Review editor Sam Tanenhaus wrote in March 2011:

At the time of her trial, Ms. Coplon drew a great deal of interest, particularly in the lively tabloid press of the day. A 27-year-old cum laude graduate of Barnard, employed in the internal security section of the Justice Department, she seemed the model postwar "government girl," fetchingly clad in snug sweaters and New Look skirts . . [with the] sort of attention Lindsay Lohan's courtroom appearances attract today.

== Personal life ==
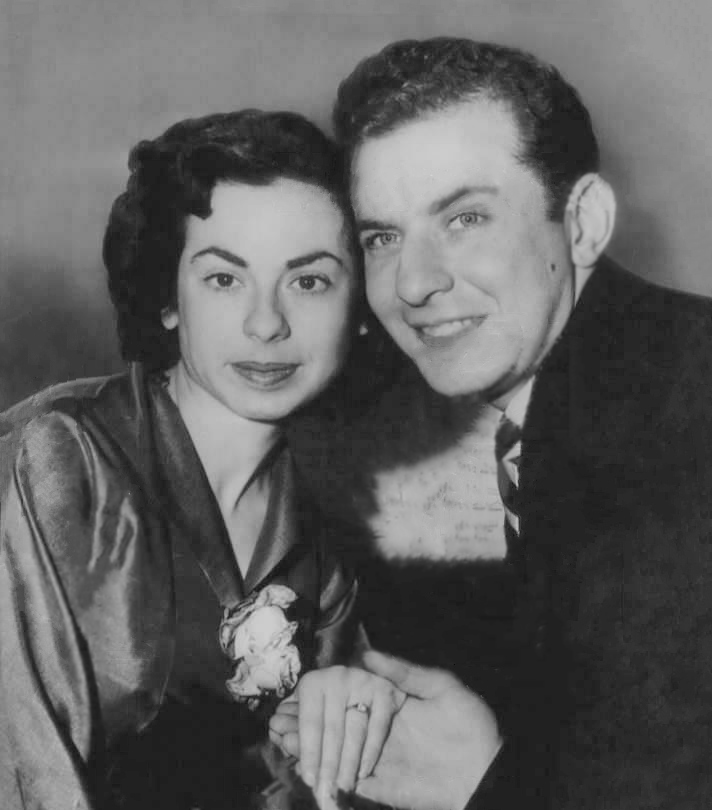
Coplon and Socolov 1950

In 1950 Coplon married one of her attorneys, Albert Socolov, and they remained married until her death in 2011. The couple had four children.

Once the trials concluded, Judith Coplon disappeared from the public space. She went on to pass a master's degree in education, published bilingual books and taught creative writing to women in prison.

== See also ==
- Preceding case: Hollywood Ten (1947)
- Concurrent cases:
  - Hiss–Chambers Case (1949–1950)
  - Smith Act trials of Communist Party leaders (1949–1958)
- House Committee on Un-American Activities (HUAC)
