= Bernard Bernstein (economist) =

American economist and public official

- Born: November 30, 1908; New York City, New York
- Died: February 6, 1990 (aged 81); New York City, New York
- Education: Columbia Law School
- Occupation: Lawyer
- Known for: Advisor to Dwight D. Eisenhower

Bernard Bernstein (November 30, 1908 –February 6, 1990) was an American economist and public official.

== Background ==
Bernard Bernstein was born on November 30, 1908, in New York City. He had at least one brother and one sister. He received Bachelor's and Law degrees from Columbia University.

== Career ==
After graduating from Columbia University, circa 1932, Bernstein practiced law privately.

From 1933 until 1948, Bernstein served as an attorney for the U.S. Treasury Department.

Additionally, he held multiple offices concurrently. From 1942 through 1943, he was a Financial Adviser, North African Economic Control Board. From 1944 through 1945, he was Director, Finance Division and Director of the Division of Investigation of Cartels and External Assets, U.S. Group Control Commission for Germany. From 1942 through 1945, he acted as Financial Adviser to Gen. Eisenhower for Civil Affairs and Military Government, European Theater of Operations and MTO. Bernstein supervised the possession of the Nazi Gold and other treasure in the Merkers Mine.

=== Bernstein's investigations ===
As a U.S. Army colonel, Bernstein served as a financial adviser to General Eisenhower in World War II, and after the war was on the Control Commission for Germany; he was removed when the Morgenthau Plan, with which he was associated, was not adopted.

In 1945 he was in charge of producing a paper that documented the culpability of I.G. Farben for its part in the Holocaust and German militarism. He so testified before the U.S. Congress.

=== Investigations into Bernstein ===
In 1955, a congressional committee investigated Bernstein for his role in alleging American corporations of espionage with I.G. Farben and then mentioned subsequent statements he made that seemed supportive of Communism (apparently because the communist Daily Worker newspaper reported his statements):

According to the Daily Worker of December 12, 1945, Col. Bernard Bernstein charged before a Senate committee that American corporations had engaged in military and economic espionage with the German chemical firm of I. G. Farben against the interests of the United States during World War II. He named the Standard Oil Company of New Jersey, the Aluminum Company of America, DuPont, and the Ethyl Export Corp. The Daily Worker headline read: "U. S. Firm Served as Spy Center for Nazis, AMG Aide Reveals"...
Again according to the Daily Worker (February 21, 1946) Colonel Bernstein spoke at a meeting of the American Jewish Conference held in Cleveland, Ohio, on February 20, 1946, and said that "Only the Russians have shown that they mean to exterminate fascism and nazism, and have already taken decisive steps in that direction."
Addressing the newly launched Congress o American Women on March 8, 1946, at a meeting in New York City, in honor of International Women's Day, celebrated as an international holiday by Communists throughout the world, Col. Bernard Bernstein declared that the Soviet Union is carrying out the Potsdam agreement on Germany, while the United States is vacillating. Speaking from the same platform, Mrs. Muriel Draper attacked Winston Churchill's "anti-Soviet war-mongering" and scored President Truman for going along with it. A participant in the meeting was Elizabeth Gurley Flynn, a Communist leader since indicted under the Smith Act (Daily Worker, March 9, 1946).
The Congress of American Women has been cited as subversive by the Attorney General and has disbanded.

The congressional committee also documented his interactions from 1941 to 1946 with Harry Dexter White, the main subject of that set of hearings.

After returning to civilian life, he served as a legal counsel to the American Jewish Conference.

== Personal life and death ==
Berstein married Bernice Lotwin; they had three children.

Bernard Bernstein died aged 81 on February 6, 1990, at New York Hospital of cardiac arrest.

== Legacy ==
His accumulated papers date from 1933 to 1955 in bulk. They include documents from 1863 to 1993. The collection — 10.8 linear feet in 27 boxes amounting to 22,500 pages — is deposited in the Harry S. Truman Presidential Library. In the main, they document Bernstein's army officer work investigating "the economic resources of the Third Reich (its looted gold and other assets, as well as the activities of German cartels), and in formulating financial policies for Germany and other areas of Europe under Allied occupation."
