= History of antisemitism in the United States =

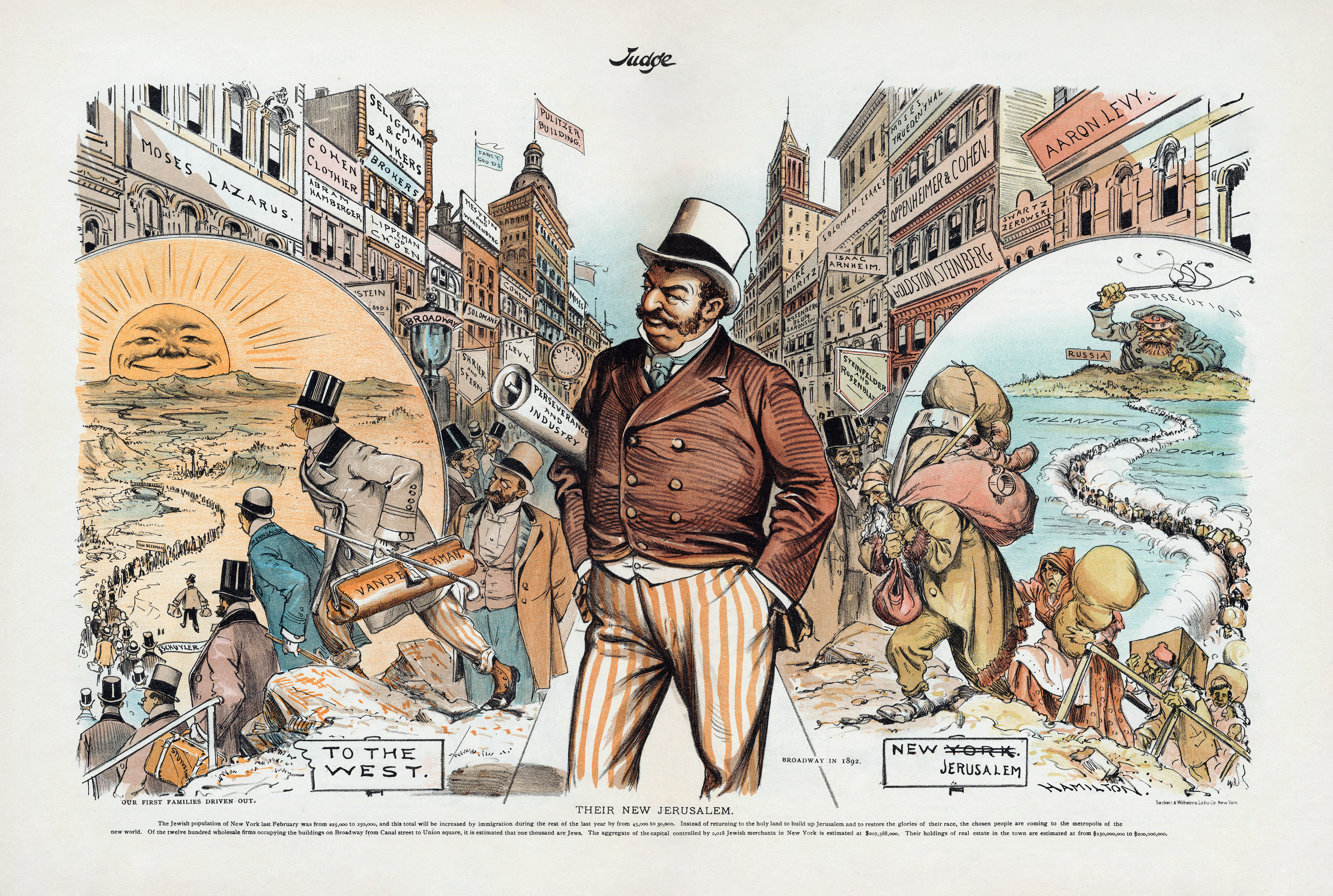
Antisemitic caricature from Judge magazine depicting negative tropes of the Jewish diaspora, 1892.

Antisemitism in the United States has existed since the colonial era, evolving from early religious and state-based discrimination to systemic social and economic exclusion in the 19th and 20th centuries. While the American experience often differed from the endemic violence of European antisemitism, Jewish Americans faced significant periods of hostility, including official government actions during the American Civil War and widespread social discrimination.

During the late 19th and early 20th centuries, antisemitism in the U.S. peaked alongside the rise of nativism and racial theory. This era saw the implementation of restrictive quotas in higher education, exclusion from private clubs and housing, and the propagation of antisemitic tropes by prominent figures such as Henry Ford and Father Coughlin. Although antisemitic sentiment generally declined following World War II and the Holocaust, the 21st century has seen a documented resurgence in antisemitic rhetoric and hate crimes.

== Historiography ==
Historians continue to study and debate the extent of antisemitism in American history and how American antisemitism has similarities and distinctions with its European counterpart.

Historian Reena Sigman Friedman notes similarities between the form and substance of European and American antisemitism, and has stated "[t]hough antisemitism appeared in a number of forms during and after the American Civil War, it was amplified by the introduction of race theory in the United States, often linked to nativism, xenophobia and anti-urban sentiment, in the late 19th and early 20th centuries." Hasia Diner provides a similar perspective, stating, "by the 1870s in Europe and the United States, the argument shifts to the Jews as defective. Not Judaism as defective, but the Jew as a particular social type who had defective mental and moral abilities."

John Higham noted certain distinctions between European and American antisemitism, suggesting that in the United States "no decisive event, no deep crisis, no powerful social movement, no great individual is associated primarily with, or significant chiefly because of anti-Semitism." Historian David A. Gerber stated that antisemitism "has been a distinctly minor feature of the nation's historical development" because historians such as Higham have previously "taken little interest it." Historian Britt Tevis recognized this trend, noting "Handlin and Higham's ideas (especially Higham's) remain influential, and many American Jewish historians continue to present antisemitism as largely insignificant, momentary, primarily social." Tevis questions this trend, noting that "a major component of this argument is the claim that, unlike in Europe, anti-Semitism in the United States has been an insignificant force—fleeting and more or less harmless. For the most part. ... [r]elatedly, they've argued that neither the law nor the state has played a role in perpetuating anti-Jewish sentiments. My research challenges these long held ideas by revealing the ways in which the state condoned and sometimes promoted anti-Jewish animus."

Historian Britt Tevis argues that, "Handlin and Higham's ideas (especially Higham's) remain influential, and many American Jewish historians continue to present antisemitism as largely insignificant, momentary, primarily social." Krefetz (1985) asserts that antisemitism in the 1980s seems "rooted less in religion or contempt and more rooted in envy, jealousy and fear" of Jewish affluence, and the hidden power of "Jewish money". Historically, antisemitic attitudes and rhetoric have tended to increase whenever the United States has faced a serious economic crisis, as well as during moments of political and social uncertainty and fear.

== Before 1800 ==
Jewish settlers made up a small percentage of the population in the colonial and federal periods. At the time of the Revolution, one in a thousand Americans were Jewish—about 2,500 people. Most were in families of businessmen based in the port cities of Newport, New York City, Philadelphia, Charleston, and Savannah. They prospered as well-connected traders handling imports and exports inside Britain's Atlantic empire. Nevertheless, antisemitism remained pervasive and state-based beginning at least as early as the mid-1600s, when in 1654, the Governor of New Amsterdam referred to the Jewish people as a "repugnant" and a "deceitful race," and sought to have them expelled from New Amsterdam.

The colonial governments often imposed citizenship restrictions against the Jewish settlers, as they sometimes did with Catholics, Lutherans, and Quakers. The harassment of Jews by both individuals and governments was typically less violent than in Europe, but was nevertheless frequent and systemic. Business agreements between Christian and Jewish settlers gradually became a relatively accepted practice, although fees and inequitable practices disfavoring the Jewish settlers were common. Intermarriage was not prohibited and occasionally occurred. The majority of Jewish settlers supported the Patriot cause in the Revolution.

== 19th century ==
Throughout most of the 18th and 19th centuries, antisemitism in America was common, though not typically to the extent that was endemic in Europe during the same period. Jews were viewed as a race in America as early as 1654, when the Governor of New Amsterdam referred to them as a "deceitful race" in his efforts to expel the Jews from New Amsterdam.

=== Civil War ===
On December 17, 1862, Major General Ulysses S. Grant issued General Order No. 11 expelling Jews from areas under his control in western Tennessee:

The Jews, as a class violating every regulation of trade established by the Treasury Department and also department orders, are hereby expelled ... within twenty-four hours from the receipt of this order.

Grant later issued an order "that no Jews are to be permitted to travel on the road southward." His aide, Colonel John V. DuBois, ordered "all cotton speculators, Jews, and all vagabonds with no honest means of support", to leave the district. "The Israelites especially should be kept out ... they are such an intolerable nuisance."

This order was rescinded by President Lincoln but not until it had been enforced in a number of towns. According to Jerome Chanes, Lincoln's revocation of Grant's order was based primarily on "constitutional strictures against ... the federal government singling out any group for special treatment." Chanes characterizes General Order No. 11 as "unique in the history of the United States" because it was the only overtly antisemitic official action of the United States government. Grant apologized when he ran for president in 1868, and as president, 1869–1877, he was quite friendly toward Jews.

=== Late 19th century ===
According to historians Ronald J. Jensen and Stuart Knee, by the 1870s Russian-American relations were strained by the mistreatment of American Jewish visitors in Russia. President Grant quickly responded to American Jewish requests for action to protect visitors. By the 1880s, the outbreak of antisemitic pogroms in Russia and consequent mass emigration of Jews to New York made relations worse. After 1880, escalating pogroms alienated both elite opinion and public opinion in the United States. In 1903, the Kishinev pogrom killed 47 Jews, injured 400, and left 10,000 homeless and dependent on relief. American Jews began large-scale organized financial help and assisted in emigration from Russia. More violence in Russia led in 1911 to the United States repealing an 1832 commercial treaty.

=== Late 19th-century antisemitic media ===
The late 19th century in the United States saw a rise in antisemitic media that reflected and amplified public anxieties about Jewish immigration and economic influence. One notable example is an 1892 caricature "Their New Jerusalem" published in Judge magazine, which portrays Jewish immigrants and established Jewish businessmen as threats to American economic stability and cultural values. The central figure, a wealthy Jewish man carrying a scroll labeled "Perseverance and Industry," stands amid a bustling New York street dominated by Jewish-owned businesses, while established American families are depicted heading westward in apparent flight. This image serves as a vivid illustration of how antisemitic tropes, such as Jewish economic dominance and cultural displacement, permeated late 19th-century American society. Americans, who were influenced by European antisemitic tropes and stereotypes, such as the greedy "moneylender" as such tropes were widely visible in Europe, as seen in books such as the Gentile Tales and Blood Libel. Such depictions shaped societal attitudes, fueling nativist and exclusionary sentiments during a period of significant immigration.

=== Immigration from Eastern Europe ===
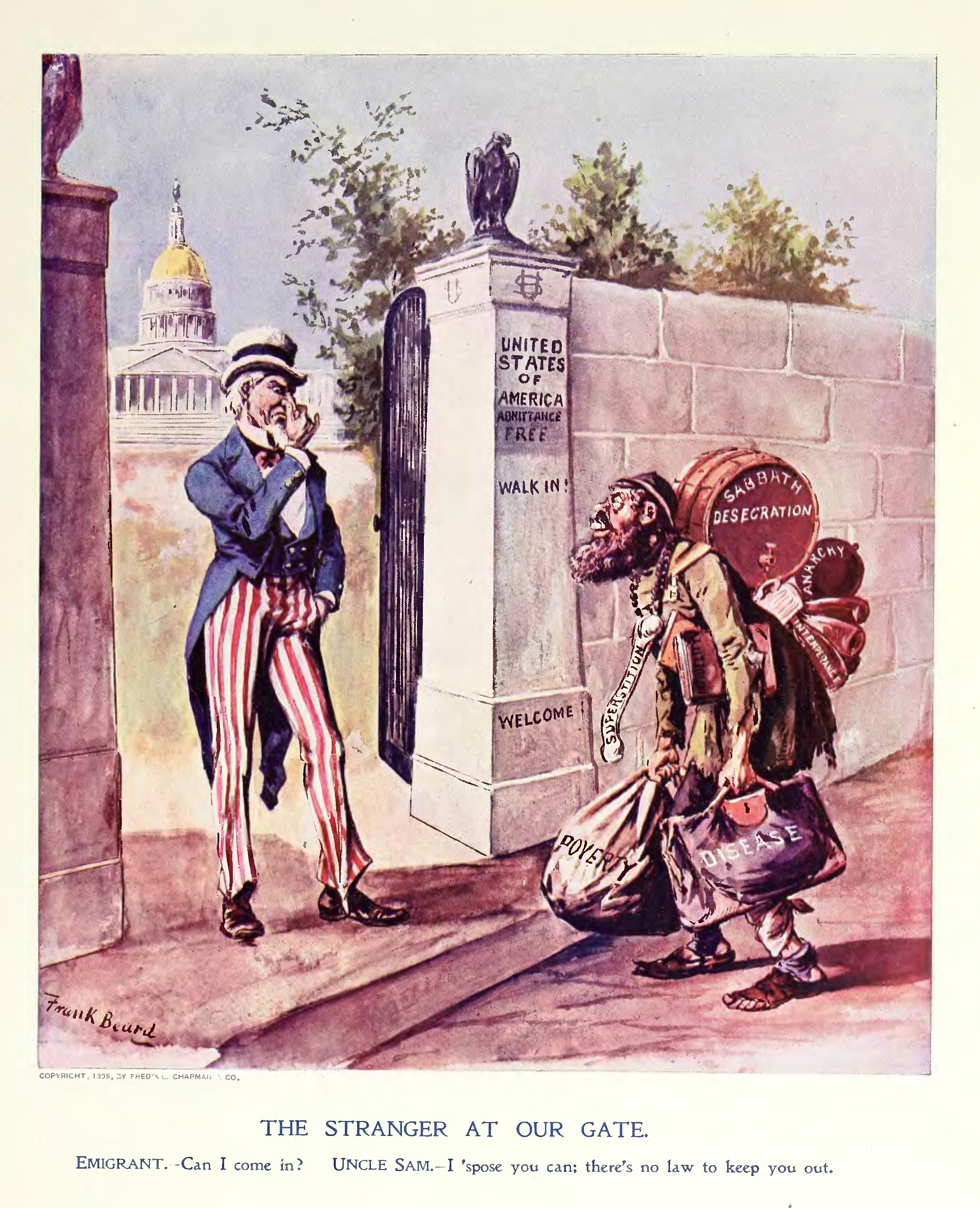
Antisemitic anti-immigrant cartoon, 1890

Between 1881 and 1920, approximately 3 million Ashkenazi Jews from Eastern Europe immigrated to America, many of them fleeing pogroms and the difficult economic conditions which were widespread in much of Eastern Europe during this time. Jews, along with many Eastern and Southern European immigrants, came to work the country's growing mines and factories. Many Americans distrusted these Jewish immigrants.

Between 1900 and 1924, approximately 1.75 million Jews immigrated to America's shores, the bulk from Eastern Europe. Whereas before 1900, American Jews never amounted even to 1 percent of America's total population, by 1930 Jews formed about 3.5 percent. This dramatic increase, combined with the upward mobility of some Jews, contributed to a resurgence of antisemitism.

As the European immigration swelled the Jewish population of the United States, there developed a growing sense of Jews as different. Indeed, the United States government's Census Bureau classified Jews as their own race, Hebrews, and a 1909 effort led by Simon Wolf to remove Hebrew as a race through a Congressional bill failed. Jerome Chanes attributes this perception on the fact that Jews were concentrated in a small number of occupations: they were perceived as being mostly clothing manufacturers, shopkeepers and department store owners. He notes that so-called "German Jews" (who in reality came not just from Germany but from Austria-Hungary and other countries as well) found themselves increasingly segregated by a widespread social antisemitism that became even more prevalent in the twentieth century and which persists in vestigial form even today.

=== Populism ===
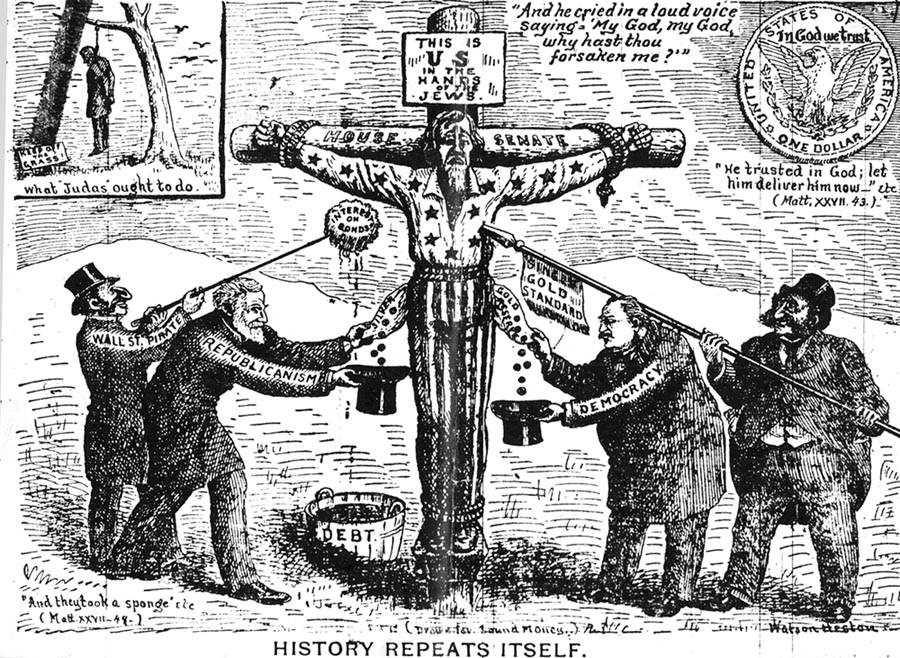
An antisemitic political cartoon in an issue of "Sound Money" magazine which appeared in 1896. "This is the U.S. in the Hands of the Jews", portraying Uncle Sam being crucified like Jesus. Two figures labeled "Wall Street Pirates" with caricatured Jewish features poke him with a spear and raise a poisoned sponge to his lips. The tub of poison is labeled "Debt", the poisoned sponge "Interest on Bonds", and the spear "Single Gold Standard". Below, figures labeled "Republicanism" (Caricature of James G. Blaine) and "Democracy" (Caricature of Grover Cleveland) pick Uncle Sam's pockets.

In the middle of the 19th century, a number of German Jewish immigrants founded investment banking firms which later became mainstays of the industry. Most prominent Jewish banks in the United States were big city investment banks, rather than local commercial banks. Although Jews played only a minor role in the nation's small town banks, system, the prominence of Jewish investment bankers such as the Rothschild family in Europe, and Jacob Schiff, of Kuhn, Loeb & Co. in New York City, made the claims of antisemites believable to some.

Another focus of antisemitic fear was the allegation that Jews were at the center of an international conspiracy to fix the currency and thus the economy to a single gold standard.

One example of allegations of Jewish control of finances during the 1890s is Mary Elizabeth Lease, a leading Populist from Kansas, who said, "the government, at the bid of Wall Street, repudiated its contracts with the people ... in the interest of Shylock."

Historians have debated the importance of antisemitic rhetoric in the Populist movement in rural America in the 1890s. Richard Hofstadter, a leading historian, in 1955 argued that the Greenback-Populist tradition was responsible for most of the popular antisemitism in the United States. He notes that there were various forms of antisemitism but, "It was chiefly Populist writers who expressed that identification of the Jew with the usurer and the 'international gold ring' which was the central theme of the American anti-Semitism. ... for many silverites, the Jew was an organic part of the conspiracy theory of history." Historians no longer agree with Hofstadter. Several prominent Populists did express hostile images, but most did not. Historian Walter Nugent read through 200 Populist newspapers and pamphlets and found little evidence to support claims of widespread antisemitism.

According to Deborah Dash Moore, populist antisemitism used the Jew to symbolize both capitalism and urbanism so as to personify concepts that were too abstract to serve as satisfactory objects of animosity.

=== Upper class discrimination ===
In 1877, the rich New York City banker Joseph Seligman and his family were turned away from the elite Grand Union Hotel in Saratoga Springs, New York. They had often been guests, but the new owner Henry Hilton decreed that no Jews be admitted. Hilton and Seligman belonged to rival political factions in New York, and took their cases to the media. Hilton stated his goal was to satisfy his other guests; they did not want to associate with Jews. It was a newsworthy event. Across the Northeast, elite hotels and private clubs began excluding Jews. The exclusion remained legal until the middle 20th century.

Jews encountered resistance when they tried to move into higher white-collar and professional positions. Banking, insurance, public utilities, medical schools, hospitals, large law firms and faculty positions, restricted the entrance of Jews. In major cities, Jews established their own financial and legal facilities. By the early 20th century, the surge of Jews attending elite colleges was seen as a threat to established traditions; many quietly imposed quotas to keep the Jewish element under 10 or 20 percent. Less prestigious schools without large endowments relied on tuition and seldom imposed quotas. Likewise elite medical and law schools established quotas. The quota system ended in the 1940s.

== Early 20th century ==
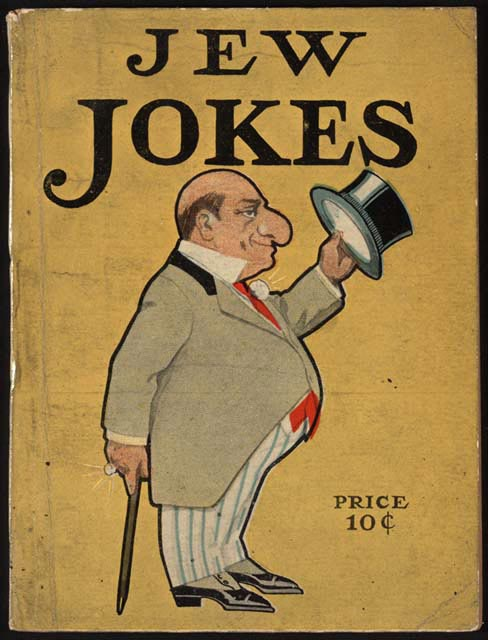
Cover of Jew Jokes, (Cleveland: Arthur Westbrook Company) 1908

In the first half of the 20th century, Jews were discriminated against in employment, access to residential and resort areas, membership in clubs and organizations, and in tightened quotas on Jewish enrollment and teaching positions in colleges and universities. Restaurants, hotels and other establishments that barred Jews from entry were called "restricted".

=== Lynching of Leo Frank ===
In 1913, a Jewish American in Atlanta named Leo Frank was convicted for the rape and murder of Mary Phagan, a 13-year-old Christian girl who he employed. In the middle of the night on April 27, 1913, Mary Phagan was found dead by a night watchman in the basement of a pencil factory in Atlanta, Georgia. Leo Frank, the superintendent of the factory, was the last person to acknowledge seeing her alive earlier that day after paying her weekly wages. Detectives took Frank to the scene of the crime and the morgue to view the body. After further questioning, they concluded that he was most likely not the murderer. In the days following, rumors began to spread amongst the public that the girl had been sexually assaulted prior to her death. This sparked outrage amongst the public which called for immediate action and justice for her murder. On April 29, following Phagan's funeral, public outrage reached its pinnacle. Under immense pressure to identify a suspect, detectives arrested Leo Frank on the same day. Being a Jewish factory owner, previously from the north, Frank was an easy target for the antisemitic population who already distrusted northern merchants who had come to the south to work following the American Civil War. During the trial, the primary witness was Jim Conley, a black janitor who worked at the factory. Initially a suspect, Conley became the state's main witness in the trial against Frank.

Prior to the trial, Conely had given four conflicting statements regarding his role in the murder. In court, the Frank's lawyers were unable to disprove Conley's claims that he was forced by Frank to dispose of Phagan's body. The trial gathered immense attention especially from Atlantans, who gathered in large crowds around the courthouse demanding for a guilty verdict. In addition to this, much of the media coverage at the time took an antisemitic tone and after 25 days, Leo Frank was found guilty of murder on August 25 and sentenced to death by hanging on August 26. The verdict was met with cheers and celebration from the crowd. Following the verdict, Frank's lawyers submitted a total of five appeals to the Georgia Supreme Court as well as the U.S. Supreme Court claiming that Frank's absence on the day of the verdict and the amount of public pressure and influence swayed the jury. After this, the case was brought to Georgia governor John M. Slaton. Despite the public demanding for him to hold the verdict, Slaton changed Frank's verdict from death sentence to life imprisonment, believing that his innocence would eventually be established and he would be set free. This decision was met with immense public outrage, causing riots and even forcing Slaton to declare Martial Law at one point. On August 16, 1915, 25 citizens stormed a prison farm in Milledgeville where Leo Frank was being held. Taking Frank from his cell, they drove him to Marietta, the hometown of Mary Phagan, and hanged him from a tree. Leaders of the lynch mob would later gather at Stone Mountain to revive the Ku Klux Klan.

In response to the lynching of Leo Frank, Sigmund Livingston founded the Anti-Defamation League (ADL) under the sponsorship of B'nai B'rith. The ADL became the leading Jewish group fighting antisemitism in the United States. The lynching of Leo Frank coincided with and helped spark the revival of the Ku Klux Klan. The Klan disseminated the view that anarchists, communists and Jews were subverting American values and ideals.

=== World War I ===
With the American entry into World War I, Jews were targeted by antisemites as "slackers" and "war-profiteers" responsible for many of the ills of the country. For example, a U.S. Army manual published for war recruits stated that, "The foreign born, and especially Jews, are more apt to malinger than the native-born." When ADL representatives protested about this to President Woodrow Wilson, he ordered the manual recalled. The ADL also mounted a campaign to give Americans the facts about military and civilian contributions of Jews to the war effort.

=== 1920s ===
Antisemitism in the United States reached its peak during the 1920s and 1930s. The attraction of the Ku Klux Klan in the mid-1920s, the antisemitic works of Henry Ford, and radio speeches by Father Coughlin in the late 1930s indicated the strength of suspicions about Jews.

One element in American antisemitism during the early 1920s was the identification of Jews with Bolshevism where the concept of Bolshevism was used pejoratively in the country (Jewish Bolshevism). The decision by New York University to try to limit Jewish enrollment at its University Heights campus -- at a time when several universities imposed quotas or restrictions on Jewish enrollment -- was an example of the intersection of antisemitism and anti-Bolshevism.

Immigration legislation enacted in the United States in 1921 and 1924 was interpreted widely as being at least partly anti-Jewish in intent because it strictly limited the immigration quotas of eastern European nations with large Jewish populations, nations from which 3 million Jews had immigrated to the United States by 1920.

Contrary to popular belief, Jewish prejudice in fact would remain rampant in the 1920s, in spite of what the popular culture presence of Jewish entertainers, including openly Jewish Al Jolson, and the "exception" of openly Jewish main characters in The Jazz Singer suggested. As Steve G. Kellman of The American Scholar noted "During the 1920s, when talented, ambitious Jews were reshaping Tin Pan Alley and Broadway, most Hollywood moguls were upstart—often immigrant—Jews. Yet, in a country in which anti-Semitism and xenophobia were rampant, they were reluctant to allow Jewish content in their movies. The Jazz Singer was a notable exception, and aside from Biblical epics depicting ancient Hebrews, it would remain an anomaly for at least 20 years." Sheldon Kirshner of The Times of Israel also described Al Jolson and The Jazz Singer as "the striking exception in 1920s America, a nation where the Ku Klux Klan reigned supreme and Jews were often treated like second-class citizens."

==== Restriction on immigration ====
In 1924, Congress passed the Johnson–Reed Act severely restricting immigration. Although the act did not specifically target Jews, the effect of the legislation was that 86% of the 165,000 permitted entries were from Northern European countries, with Germany, Britain, and Ireland having the highest quotas. The act effectively diminished the flow of Jewish immigrants from Eastern Europe to a trickle.

==== Henry Ford ====
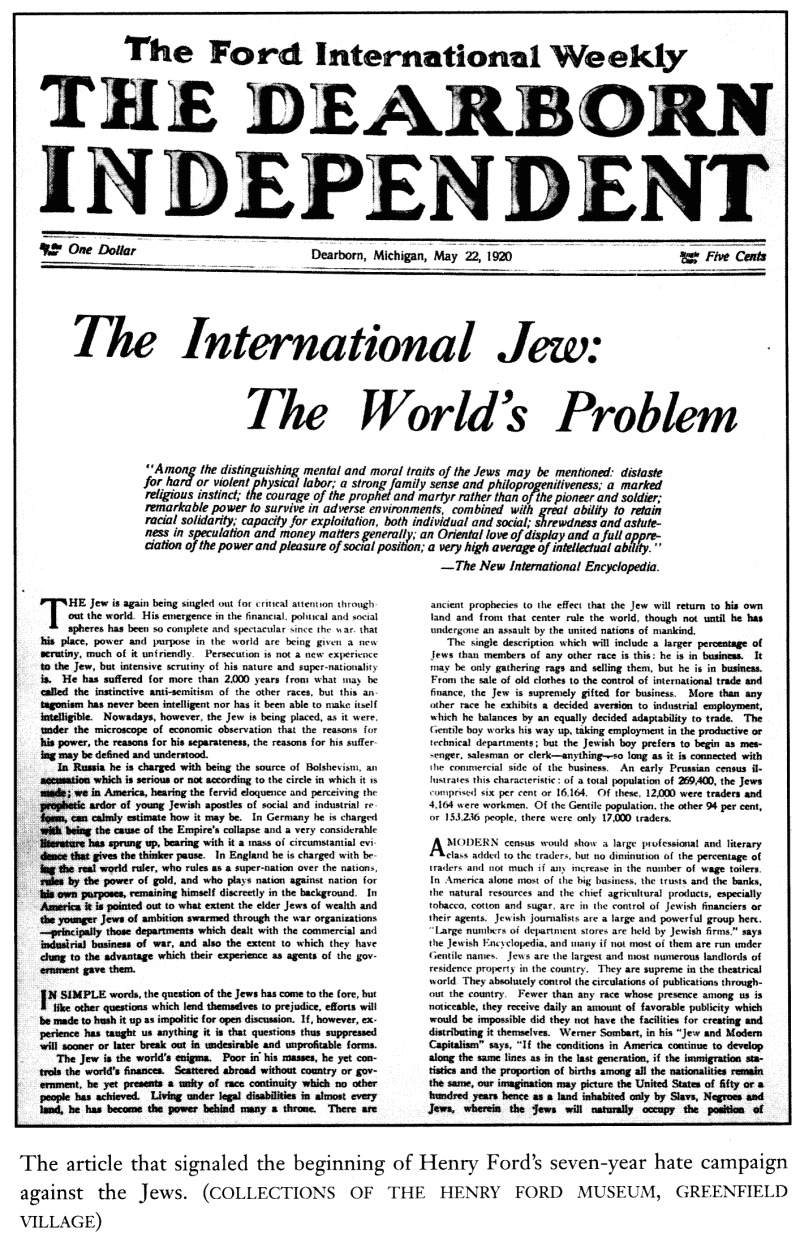
The Dearborn Independent

Henry Ford was a pacifist who opposed World War I, and he believed that Jews were responsible for starting wars in order to profit from them: "International financiers are behind all war. They are what is called the international Jew: German Jews, French Jews, English Jews, American Jews. I believe that in all those countries except our own the Jewish financier is supreme ... here the Jew is a threat". Ford believed that Jews were responsible for capitalism, and in their role as financiers, they did not contribute anything of value to society.

In 1915, during World War I, Ford blamed Jews for instigating the war, saying "I know who caused the war: German-Jewish bankers." Later, in 1925, Ford said "What I oppose most is the international Jewish money power that is met in every war. That is what I oppose—a power that has no country and that can order the young men of all countries out to death'". According to author Steven Watts, Ford's antisemitism was partially due to a noble desire for world peace.

Ford became aware of The Protocols of the Elders of Zion and believed it to be a legitimate document, and he published portions of it in his weekly magazine sent to Ford dealerships, the Dearborn Independent. In 1920–21 it carried a series of articles expanding on the themes of financial control by Jews, entitled:

1. Jewish Idea in American Monetary Affairs: The remarkable story of Paul Warburg, who began work on the United States monetary system after three weeks residence in this country
2. Jewish Idea Molded Federal Reserve System: What Baruch was in War Material, Paul Warburg was in War Finances; Some Curious revelations of money and politics.
3. Jewish Idea of a Central Bank for America: The evolution of Paul M. Warburg's idea of Federal Reserve System without government management.
4. How Jewish International Finance Functions: The Warburg family and firm divided the world between them and did amazing things which non-Jews could not do
5. Jewish Power and America's Money Famine: The Warburg Federal Reserve sucks money to New York, leaving productive sections of the country in disastrous need.
6. The Economic Plan of International Jews: An outline of the Protocolists' monetary policy, with notes on the parallel found in Jewish financial practice.

One of the articles, "Jewish Power and America's Money Famine", asserted that the power exercised by Jews over the nation's supply of money was insidious by helping deprive farmers and others outside the banking coterie of money when they needed it most. The article asked the question: "Where is the American gold supply? ... It may be in the United States but it does not belong to the United States" and it drew the conclusion that Jews controlled the gold supply and, hence, American money.

Another of the articles, "Jewish Idea Molded Federal Reserve System" was a reflection of Ford's suspicion of the Federal Reserve System and its proponent, Paul Warburg. Ford believed the Federal Reserve system was secretive and insidious.

These articles gave rise to claims of antisemitism against Ford, and in 1929 he signed a statement apologizing for the articles.

=== 1930s ===
Antisemitic activists in the 1930s were led by Father Charles Coughlin, William Dudley Pelley, and Gerald L. K. Smith. Ford's old attacks on Jews continued to be circulated by other people. They promulgated various interrelated conspiracy theories, widely spreading the fear that Jews were working for the destruction or replacement of white Americans and Christianity in the U.S.

According to Gilman and Katz, antisemitism increased dramatically in the 1930s with demands being made to exclude American Jews from American social, political and economic life.

During the 1930s and 1940s, right-wing demagogues linked the Great Depression in the United States to the New Deal, and the Presidency of Franklin D. Roosevelt. They attributed the threat of war in Europe to the machinations of an imagined international Jewish conspiracy that was both communist and capitalist. A new twist appeared which accused "the Jews" of dominating Roosevelt's administration, of causing the Great Depression, and of dragging the United States into a war against a new Germany which deserved nothing but admiration. Roosevelt's "New Deal" was derisively referred to as the "Jew Deal".

Father Charles Coughlin, a Catholic radio preacher increasingly attacked "the Jews" after 1936. Gerald L. K. Smith, a Protestant minister, founded the Committee of One Million in 1937, declaring that "Christian character is the basis of all real Americanism." Other antisemitic agitators included Fritz Julius Kuhn of the German American Bund, William Dudley Pelley of the Silver Legion of America, and the Rev. Gerald Winrod of the Defenders of the Christian Faith.

In the end, promoters of antisemitism achieved no more than a passing popularity as the threat of Nazi Germany became more and more evident to the American electorate. Steven Roth asserts that there was never a real possibility of a "Jewish question" appearing on the American political agenda as it did in Europe; according to Roth, the resistance to political antisemitism in the United States was due to the heterogeneity of the American political structure.

==== American attitudes towards Jews ====
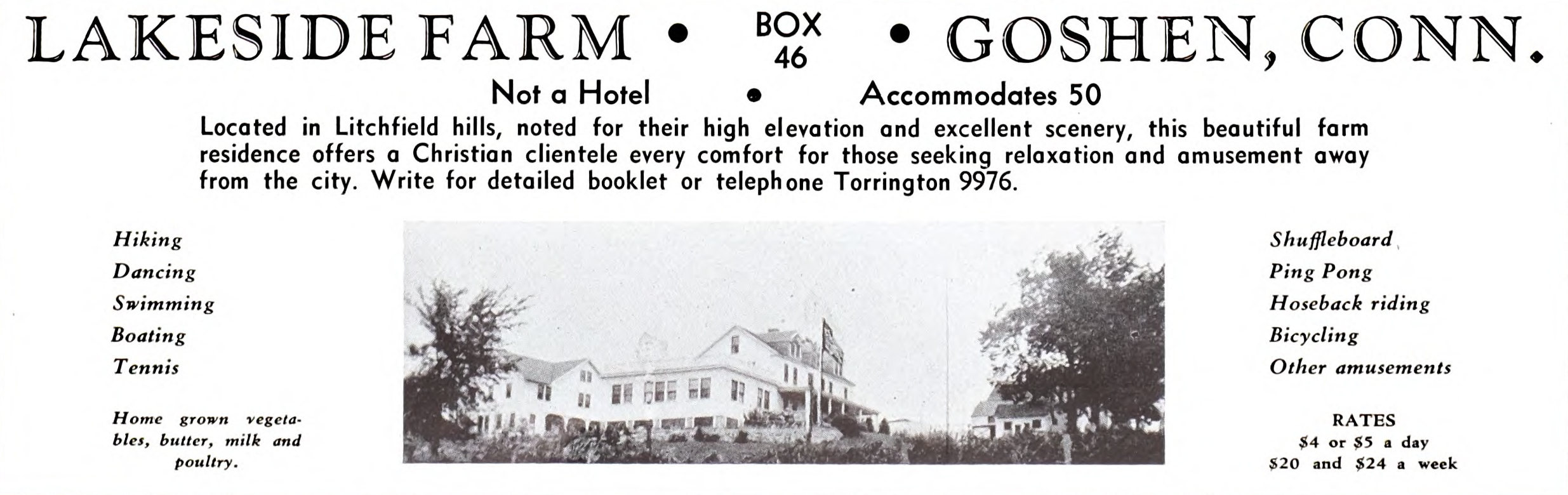
A 1942 advertisement for recreational lodging in Goshen, Connecticut stating that the facility is not a hotel and caters to Christian clientele specifically.

In a 1938 poll, approximately 60 percent of the respondents held a low opinion of Jews, labeling them "greedy," "dishonest," and "pushy." 41 percent of respondents agreed that Jews had "too much power in the United States," and this figure rose to 58 percent by 1945. Several surveys taken from 1940 to 1946 found that Jews were seen as a greater threat to the welfare of the United States than any other national, religious, or racial group.

==== Father Charles Coughlin ====
The main spokesman for antisemitic sentiment was Charles Coughlin, a Catholic priest whose weekly radio program drew between 5 and 12 million listeners in the late 1930s. Coughlin's newspaper, Social Justice, reached a circulation of 800,000 at its peak in 1937.

After the 1936 election, Coughlin increasingly expressed sympathy for the fascist policies of Hitler and Mussolini, as an antidote to Bolshevism. Starting in 1938 his weekly radio broadcasts became suffused with overtly antisemitic themes, such as blaming the Great Depression on an international conspiracy of Jewish bankers. Coughlin began publication of a weekly magazine, Social Justice, during this period, in which he printed antisemitic polemics such as The Protocols of the Elders of Zion. Like Joseph Goebbels in Berlin, Coughlin claimed that Marxist atheism in Europe was a Jewish plot. The December 5, 193,8 issue of Social Justice included an article by Coughlin which closely resembled a speech made by Goebbels on September 13, 1935, attacking Jews, atheists and communists, with some sections being copied verbatim by Coughlin from an English translation of the Goebbels speech. On November 20, 1938, two weeks after Kristallnacht, when thousands of Jews across Germany were attacked, and Jewish businesses, homes and synagogues burned, Coughlin blamed the Jewish victims, saying that "Jewish persecution only followed after Christians first were persecuted." After this speech, and as his programs became more antisemitic, some radio stations, including those in New York and Chicago, began refusing to air his speeches without pre-approved scripts; in New York, his programs were cancelled by WINS and WMCA, leaving Coughlin to broadcasting on the Newark part-time station WHBI. This made Coughlin a hero in Germany, where papers ran headlines like: "America is Not Allowed to Hear the Truth."

On December 18, 1938, 2,000 of Coughlin's followers marched in New York protesting potential asylum law changes that would allow more Jews (including refugees from Hitler's persecution) into the US. They chanted "Send Jews back where they came from in leaky boats!" and "Wait until Hitler comes over here!" The protests continued for several months. Donald Warren, using information from the FBI and German government archives, has also argued that Coughlin received indirect funding from Nazi Germany during this period.

After 1936, Coughlin began supporting an organization called the Christian Front, which claimed him as an inspiration. In January, 1940, the Christian Front was shut down when the FBI discovered the group was arming itself and "planning to murder Jews, communists, and 'a dozen Congressmen'" and eventually establish, in J. Edgar Hoover's words, "a dictatorship, similar to the Hitler dictatorship in Germany." Coughlin publicly stated, after the plot was discovered, that he still did not "disassociate himself from the movement," and though he was never linked directly to the plot, his reputation suffered a fatal decline.

After the attack on Pearl Harbor and the declaration of war in December 1941, the anti-interventionist movement (such as the America First Committee) sputtered out, and isolationists like Coughlin were seen as being sympathetic to the enemy. In 1942, the new bishop of Detroit ordered Coughlin to stop his controversial political activities and confine himself to his duties as a parish priest.

==== Pelley and Winrod ====
William Dudley Pelley founded (1933) the antisemitic Silver Legion of America; nine years later he was convicted of sedition. Gerald Winrod, leader of the Defenders of the Christian Faith, received strong support from the Mennonites of Kansas. During World War II, he was indicted for conspiracy to cause insubordination in the military, but the charges were dropped.

==== America First Committee ====
The avant-garde of the new non-interventionism was the America First Committee, which included the aviation hero Charles Lindbergh and many prominent Americans. The America First Committee opposed any involvement in the war in Europe.

Officially, America First avoided any appearance of antisemitism and voted to drop Henry Ford as a member for his overt antisemitism.

In a speech delivered on September 11, 1941, at an America First rally, Lindbergh claimed that three groups had been "pressing this country toward war": the Roosevelt Administration, the British, and the Jews—and complained about what he insisted was the Jews' "large ownership and influence in our motion pictures, our press, our radio and our government."

In his diary Lindbergh wrote: "We must limit to a reasonable amount the Jewish influence. ... Whenever the Jewish percentage of total population becomes too high, a reaction seems to invariably occur. It is too bad because a few Jews of the right type are, I believe, an asset to any country."

==== German American Bund ====
The German American Bund held parades in New York City in the late 1930s which featured Nazi uniforms and flags featuring swastikas alongside American flags. Some 20,000 people attended their big rally where Bund leader Fritz Julius Kuhn criticized President Franklin D. Roosevelt and ridiculed him as "Frank D. Rosenfeld", calling his New Deal the "Jew Deal", and espousing his belief in the existence of a Bolshevik-Jewish conspiracy in America.

=== Refugees from Nazi Germany ===
In the years before and during World War II the United States Congress, the Roosevelt Administration, and public opinion expressed concern about the fate of Jews in Europe but consistently refused to permit immigration of Jewish refugees.

In a report issued by the State Department during the Clinton Administration, Undersecretary of State Stuart Eizenstat noted that the United States accepted only 21,000 refugees from Europe and did not significantly raise or even fill its restrictive quotas, accepting far fewer Jews per capita than many of the neutral European countries and fewer in absolute terms than Switzerland.

According to David Wyman, "The United States and its Allies were willing to attempt almost nothing to save the Jews." There is some debate as to whether U.S. policies were generally targeted against all immigrants or specifically against Jews in particular. Wyman characterized FDR advisor and State Department official in charge of immigration policy Breckinridge Long as a nativist, more anti-immigrant than just antisemitic.

=== SS St. Louis ===
The SS St. Louis sailed out of Hamburg into the Atlantic Ocean in May 1939 carrying one non-Jewish and 936 (mainly German) Jewish refugees seeking asylum from Nazi persecution just before World War II. On June 4, 1939, having failed to obtain permission to disembark passengers in Cuba, the St. Louis was also refused permission to unload on orders of President Roosevelt as the ship waited in the Caribbean Sea between Florida and Cuba.

== The Holocaust ==
During World War II and the Holocaust, antisemitism was a factor that limited American Jewish action during the war, and it also put American Jews in a difficult position. It is clear that antisemitism was a prevalent attitude in the US, and it was even more widespread in America during the Holocaust. In America, antisemitism, which reached high levels in the late 1930s, continued to rise in the 1940s. During the years before the Attack on Pearl Harbor, over a hundred antisemitic organizations were responsible for pumping hate propaganda to the American public. Furthermore, especially in New York City and Boston, young gangs vandalized Jewish cemeteries and synagogues, and attacks on Jewish youngsters were common. Swastikas and anti-Jewish slogans, as well as antisemitic literature, were all spread. In 1944, a public opinion poll showed that a quarter of Americans still regarded Jews as a "menace." Antisemitism in the State Department played a large role in Washington's hesitant response to the plight of European Jews persecuted by Nazis.

In a 1943 speech on the floor of Congress quoted in both The Jewish News of Detroit and the antisemitic magazine The Defender of Wichita, Mississippi Representative John E. Rankin espoused a conspiracy of "alien-minded" Communist Jews arranging for white women to be raped by African American men:

When those communistic Jews—of whom the decent Jews are ashamed—go around here and hug and kiss these Negroes, dance with them, intermarry with them, and try to force their way into white restaurants, white hotels and white picture shows, they are not deceiving any red-blooded American, and, above all, they are not deceiving the men in our armed forces—as to who is at the bottom of all this race trouble.

The better element of the Jews, and especially the old line American Jews throughout the South and West, are not only ashamed of, but they are alarmed at, the activities of these communistic Jews who are stirring this trouble up.

They have caused the deaths of many good Negroes who never would have got into trouble if they had been left alone, as well as the deaths of many good white people, including many innocent, unprotected white girls, who have been raped and murdered by vicious Negroes, who have been encouraged by those alien-minded Communists to commit such crimes.

=== US Government's policy ===
Josiah DuBois wrote the famous "Report to the Secretary on the Acquiescence of This Government in the Murder of the Jews," which Treasury Secretary Henry Morgenthau Jr. used to convince President Franklin D. Roosevelt to establish the War Refugee Board in 1944. Randolph Paul was also a principal sponsor of this report, the first contemporaneous Government paper attacking America's dormant complicity in the Holocaust.

Entitled "Report to the Secretary on the Acquiescence of This Government in the Murder of the Jews", the document was an indictment of the U.S. State Department's diplomatic, military, and immigration policies. Among other things, the Report narrated the State Department's inaction and in some instances active opposition to the release of funds for the Jews in Nazi-occupied Europe, and condemned immigration policies that closed American doors to Jewish refugees from countries then engaged in their systematic slaughter.

The catalyst for the Report was an incident involving 70,000 Romanian Jews whose evacuation from the Kingdom of Romania could have been procured with a $170,000 bribe. The Foreign Funds Control unit of the Treasury, which was within Paul's jurisdiction, authorized the payment of the funds, the release of which both the President and Secretary of State Cordell Hull supported. From mid-July 1943, when the proposal was made and Treasury approved, through December 1943, a combination of the State Department's bureaucracy and the British Ministry of Economic Warfare interposed various obstacles. The Report was the product of frustration over that event.

On January 16, 1944, Morgenthau and Paul personally delivered the paper to President Roosevelt, warning him that Congress would act if he did not. The result was Executive Order 9417, creating the War Refugee Board composed of the Secretaries of State, Treasury and War. Issued on January 22, 1944, the Executive Order declared that "it is the policy of this Government to take all measures within its power to rescue the victims of enemy oppression who are in imminent danger of death and otherwise to afford such victims all possible relief and assistance consistent with the successful prosecution of the war."

It has been estimated that 190,000–200,000 Jews could have been saved during World War II, had it not been for bureaucratic obstacles to immigration deliberately created by Breckinridge Long and others.

However, it was also acknowledged that immigration barriers which were created by the Emergency Quota Act of 1921 and the Immigration Act of 1924 still remained in effect at the time as well, with the continued enforcement of the laws preventing more Jewish immigrants from entering the United States at the time of the Holocaust.

== 1950s ==
=== McCarthyism ===
Antisemitism rose during the postwar anti-Communist political movement known as McCarthyism or the Red Scare. Academic David Greenberg has written in Slate, "Extreme anti-communism always contained an antisemitic component: Radical, alien Jews, in their demonology, orchestrated the Communist conspiracy." He also has argued that, in the years which followed World War II, some groups on "the American right remained closely tied to the unvarnished antisemites of the '30s who railed against the 'Jew Deal'", a bigoted term which was used against the New Deal measures of President Franklin D. Roosevelt.

=== Liberty Lobby ===
Liberty Lobby was a political advocacy organization which was founded in 1955 by Willis Carto in 1955. Liberty Lobby was founded as a conservative political organization and was known to hold strongly antisemitic views and to be a devotee of the writings of Francis Parker Yockey, who was one of a handful of post-World War II writers who revered Adolf Hitler.

== Late twentieth century ==
The Nixon White House tapes released during the Watergate scandal reveal that President Richard Nixon made numerous antisemitic remarks during his presidency. For example, he repeatedly referred to National Security Advisor Henry Kissinger as "Jew boy", and blamed the anti-Vietnam War movement and leaking of the Pentagon Papers on Jews.

Antisemitic violence in this era includes the 1977 shootings at Brith Sholom Kneseth Israel synagogue in St. Louis, Missouri, the 1984 murder of Alan Berg, the 1985 Goldmark murders, and the 1986 murder of Neal Rosenblum.

=== African-American community ===
In 1984, civil rights leader Jesse Jackson speaking to Washington Post reporter Milton Coleman referred to Jews as "Hymies" and New York City as "Hymietown." He later apologized.

During the Crown Heights riot, marchers proceeded carrying antisemitic signs and an Israeli flag was burned. Ultimately, Black and Jewish leaders developed an outreach program between their communities to help calm and possibly improve racial relations in Crown Heights over the next decade.

According to Anti-Defamation League surveys begun in 1964, African Americans are significantly more likely than white Americans to hold antisemitic beliefs, although there is a strong correlation between education level and the rejection of antisemitic stereotypes for all races. However, Black Americans of all education levels are nevertheless significantly more likely than whites of the same education level to be antisemitic. In a 1998 survey, Black Americans (34%) were found to be nearly four times as likely as white Americans (9%) to be antisemitic. Among Black people with no college education, 43% fell into the most antisemitic group (vs. 18% for the general population), which fell to 27% among Black people with some college education, and 18% among Black people with a four-year college degree (vs. 5% for the general population).

=== Other manifestations ===
During the early 1980s, isolationists on the far right made overtures to anti-war activists on the left in the United States in an attempt to join forces and protest against government policies in areas where they shared concerns. This was mainly in the area of civil liberties, opposition to United States military intervention overseas and opposition to US support for Israel. (Note: The right-wing use of anti-Zionism as a cover for antisemitism can be seen in a 1981 issue of Spotlight, published by the neo-Nazi Liberty Lobby: "A brazen attempt by influential "Israel-firsters" in the policy echelons of the Reagan administration to extend their control to the day-to-day espionage and covert-action operations of the CIA was the hidden source of the controversy and scandals that shook the U.S. intelligence establishment this summer. The dual loyalists ... have long wanted to grab a hand in the on-the-spot "field control" of the CIA's worldwide clandestine services. They want this control, not just for themselves, but on behalf of the Mossad, Israel's terrorist secret police.) As they interacted, some of the classic right-wing antisemitic scapegoating conspiracy theories began to seep into progressive circles, including stories about how a "New World Order", also called the "Shadow Government" or "The Octopus", was manipulating world governments. Antisemitic conspiracies was "peddled aggressively" by right-wing groups. Some on the left adopted the rhetoric, which was made possible by their lack of knowledge about the history of fascism and its use of "scapegoating, reductionist and simplistic solutions, demagoguery, and a conspiracy theory of history."

Towards the end of 1990, as the movement against the Gulf War began to build, a number of far-right and antisemitic groups sought out alliances with left-wing anti-war coalitions, who began to speak openly about a "Jewish lobby" that was encouraging the United States to invade Ba'athist Iraq. This idea evolved into conspiracy theories about a "Zionist-occupied government" (ZOG), which has been seen as equivalent to the early-20th century antisemitic hoax,The Protocols of the Elders of Zion. The anti-war movement as a whole rejected these overtures by the political right.

In the context of the first US-Iraq war, on September 15, 1990, Pat Buchanan appeared on The McLaughlin Group and said that "there are only two groups that are beating the drums for war in the Middle East – the Israeli defense ministry and its 'amen corner' in the United States." He also said: "The Israelis want this war desperately since they want the United States to destroy the Iraqi war machine. They want us to finish them off. They don't care about our relations with the Arab world."

== 21st century ==
Research has shown a rising level of antisemitism since the 2010s. According to the ADL, there were 8,873 antisemitic incidents across the United States in 2023, a 140% bump from the 3,698 incidents in 2022 and the highest since 1979. Compared to 2022, assaults, vandalism and harassment rose by 45%, 69% and 184% respectively in 2023. The ADL reported a 200% increase in antisemitic incidents from October 7, 2023, to September 24, 2024, vis-à-vis 2022–23. They explained that the increase was due partly to their new methodology, which was disputed by some current and former staff disagreeing with the ADL's methodology, e.g. definition of antisemitism being used.

However, according to FBI's 2023 statistics, antisemitic incidents accounted for 68% of all religion-based hate crimes, a 63% bump vis-à-vis 2022. The American Jewish Committee (AJC) said that it was likely much lower than the actual number as hate crimes had been widely underreported across the country.

Scholars claimed the rise signaled a shift in the nature and prevalence of antisemitism in United States that portended a return to the era of explicit and pervasive antisemitism. According to an August 2024 survey by the Combat Antisemitism Movement, 3.5 million Jews in America have experienced antisemitism since the 2023 Hamas-led attack on Israel. Of the 1,075 American Jews interviewed, 28% claimed to have heard "Jews care too much about money", 25% heard "Jews control the world", 14% heard "American Jews care more about Israel than about the US", and 13% heard "the Holocaust did not happen" or its severity has been "exaggerated".

=== New antisemitism ===
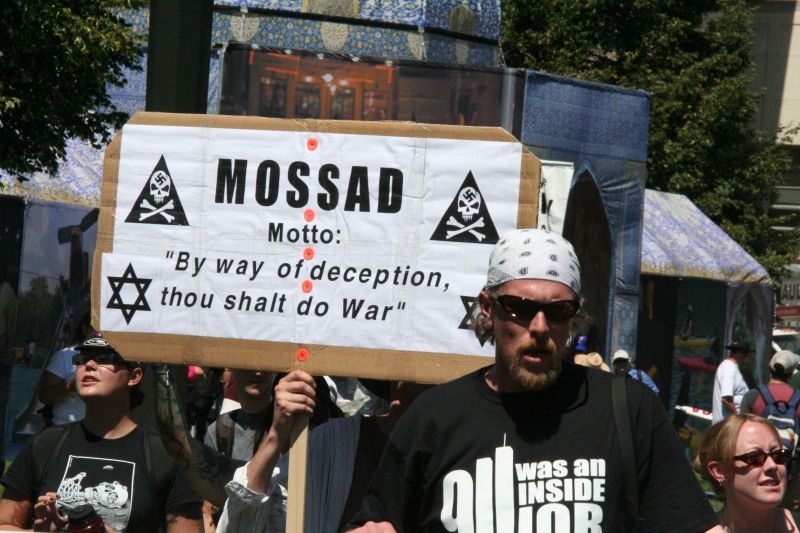
Antisemitic sign at a protest in 2008

In recent years some scholars have advanced the concept of New antisemitism, coming simultaneously from the far-left, the far right, and Islamists, which tends to focus on opposition to the creation of a Jewish homeland in the State of Israel, and argue that the language of Anti-Zionism and criticism of Israel are used to attack the Jews more broadly. In this view, the proponents of the new concept believe that criticisms of Israel and anti-Zionism are often disproportionate in degree and unique in kind, and attribute this to antisemitism.

In October 2014 the controversial opera The Death of Klinghoffer was staged in the Metropolitan Opera in New-York. The opera tells the story of the 1985 hijacking of the Achille Lauro cruise ship by Palestinian terrorists, and the killing of Jewish passenger Leon Klinghoffer. Some of the criticism opposed to the opera claimed it's partly antisemitic and glorifies the killers, as American writer and feminist Phyllis Chesler, an opera aficionado, wrote:

The Death of Klinghoffer also demonizes Israel—which is what anti-Semitism is partly about today. It incorporates lethal Islamic (and now universal) pseudo-histories about Israel and Jews. It beatifies terrorism, both musically and in the libretto.

=== Nation of Islam ===
The Nation of Islam is considered to be antisemitic by several organizations, including the Southern Poverty Law Center and the Anti-Defamation League. They claim that the Nation of Islam has engaged in revisionist and antisemitic interpretations of the Holocaust and exaggerates the role of Jews in the African slave trade. The Anti-Defamation League (ADL) alleges that Nation of Islam Health Minister, Dr. Abdul Alim Muhammad, has accused Jewish doctors of injecting Blacks with the human immunodeficiency virus.

=== Public attitudes towards Jews ===
According to a 2005 Anti-Defamation League (ADL) survey, 14 percent of U.S. residents had antisemitic views. It found "35 percent of foreign-born Hispanics" and "36 percent of African-Americans hold strong antisemitic beliefs, four times more than the 9 percent for whites". The 2005 Anti-Defamation League survey includes data on Hispanic attitudes, with 29% being most antisemitic (vs. 9% for whites and 36% for blacks); being born in the United States helped alleviate this attitude: 35% of foreign-born Hispanics, but only 19% of those born in the US.

The ADL's 2011 Survey of American Attitudes Toward Jews in America, found that the recent world economic recession increased the expression of some antisemitic viewpoints among Americans. Most of the people who were surveyed expressed pro-Jewish sentiments, with 64% of them believing that Jewish people have contributed much to U.S. social culture. Yet the polling also found that 19% of Americans answered "probably true" to the antisemitic trope that "Jews have too much control/influence on Wall Street" (see Economic antisemitism) while 15% of Americans concurred with the related statement that Jews seem "more willing to use shady practices" in business than other people do. Reflecting on the lingering antisemitism of about one in five Americans, Abraham H. Foxman, the ADL's national director, has argued, "It is disturbing that with all of the strides we have made in becoming a more tolerant society, anti-Semitic beliefs continue to hold a vice-grip on a small but not insubstantial segment of the American public."

=== Hate crimes and other antisemitic incidents ===
Escalating hate crimes which targeted Jews and members of other minority groups prompted the passage of the federal Hate Crimes Statistics Act in 1990. On April 1, 2014, Frazier Glenn Miller, a former member of the Ku Klux Klan arrived at the Jewish center of Kansas City and murdered 3 people. After his capture, the suspect was heard saying "Heil Hitler".

In April 2014, the Anti-Defamation League published its 2013 audit of antisemitic incidents, the audit pointed out a decline of 19 percent in the number of reported antisemitic incidents. The total number of antisemitic attacks across the U.S. was 751, including 31 physical assaults, 315 incidents of vandalism and 405 cases of harassment.

The Vassar Students for Justice in Palestine published a Nazi World War II propaganda poster in May 2014. The poster displayed Jews as part of a monster who tries to destroy the world. Vassar College president Catharine Hill denounced the poster. A few months later, a physical attack occurred in Philadelphia, when a Jewish student on the campus of Temple University was assaulted and punched in the face by a member of the organization Students for Justice in Palestine, who called him an antisemitic slur.

In May 2014, a Jewish mother from Chicago accused a group of students at her eighth-grade son's school of bullying and antisemitism. They used the multi-player video game Clash of Clans to create a group called "Jews Incinerator" and described themselves by stating: "we are a friendly group of racists with one goal- put all Jews into an army camp until they are disposed of. Sieg! Heil!" Two students wrote apology letters.

In June 2014, there were several antisemitic hate crimes. A swastika and other antisemitic graffiti were scrawled onto a streetside directional sign in San Francisco. More graffiti was found at the Sanctuary Lofts Apartments, where graffiti artists drew antisemitic, satanic and racist symbols inside the apartment complex. Towards the end of the month a young Jewish boy was attacked while he was leaving his home in Brooklyn. The suspect, who was on a bike, opened his hand while passing and struck the victim in the face, then yelled antisemitic slurs.

In July 2014, during the 2014 Gaza War, there was an increase in the occurrence of antisemitic incidents. In the beginning of the month an antisemitic banner was flown above Brighton Beach and Coney Island. The banner contained symbols that meant "peace plus swastika equals love". The word "PROSWASTIKA" also appeared on the banner. Additionally, there were more than 5 incidents of antisemitic graffiti across the country. In Borough Park, Brooklyn, New York, three man were arrested for vandalizing yeshiva property and a nearby house in the Jewish neighborhood by spraying swastikas and inscriptions such as "you don't belong here". Later that month swastika drawings were found on mailboxes near a national Jewish fraternity house in Eugene, Oregon. In another case, swastikas and the phrase 'kill Jews' were found on a playground floor in Riverdale, Bronx. There were also two incidents of graffiti in Clarksville, Tennessee and Lowell, Massachusetts. Some vandalism incidents occurred on a cemetery in Massachusetts. and in country club in Frontenac, Missouri Toward the end of the month there were two places were the word 'Hamas' was scribbled on Jewish property and on a Synagogue In addition, anti-Jewish leaflets were found on cars in the Jewish neighborhood in Chicago. The leaflets threatened violence if Israel did not pull out of Gaza.

In August 2014, there were two incidents in Los Angeles and Chicago where people passed out leaflets of posters from Nazi Germany. In Westwood near UCLA, a Jewish store owner got swastika-marked leaflets which contained threatens and warnings. A few days earlier, during a pro-Palestinian rally in Chicago, antisemitic leaflets were handed out to people. There were more than six incidents of graffiti and vandalism aimed at the Jewish populations in various cities in the United States. Some of the graffiti compared Israel to Nazi Germany. There was also an antisemitic attack on four Orthodox Jewish teens in Borough Park, Brooklyn towards the mid-month. Another physical attack occurred in Philadelphia, when a Jewish student on the campus of Temple University was assaulted and punched in the face by a violent member of Students for Justice in Palestine.

In the beginning of September 2014, there were more than 6 incidents of antisemitic graffiti across the country, three of them outside religious buildings such as a synagogue or yeshiva. Most of the drawings included swastika inscriptions, and one of them had the words "Murder the Jew tenant". Later that month, another antisemitic graffiti was found on the Jewish Community Center in Boulder, Colorado. Then, a few days later a violent attack occurred in Baltimore, Maryland during Rosh Hashanah, where a man drove near a Jewish school shot three man after shouting "Jews, Jews, Jews".

Towards the end of the month, a rabbi was thrown out of a Greek restaurant when the owner found out he was Jewish. Besides the above, Robert Ransdell, a write-in candidate for US Senate from Kentucky used the slogan "With Jews we lose" for his running. Another incident occurred in the University of North Carolina at Charlotte, when a Jewish student was told "to go burn in an oven." The student had also told the media she is "hunted" because of her support in Israel: "I have been called a terrorist, baby killer, woman killer, [told that] I use blood to make matzah and other foods, Christ killer, occupier, and much more."

In October 2014, a coffee shop owner in Bushwick wrote on Facebook and Twitter that "greedy infiltrators" Jewish people came to buy a house near his business. Later that month, two synagogues were desecrated in Akron, Ohio, and in Spokane, Washington. One of them was sprayed with swastika graffiti and the other one was damaged by vandalism. During the month there was also a physical attack, when the head of a Hebrew association was beaten outside Barclays Center after a Nets-Maccabi Tel Aviv basketball game. The attacker was a participant in a pro-Palestinian demonstration outside the hall. During another incident in October, fliers were handed out in the University of California, Santa Barbara that claimed "9/11 Was an Outside Job" with a large blue Star of David. The fliers contained links to several websites that accusing Israel of the attack. A few days later, antisemitic graffiti was found on Jewish fraternity house in Emory University in Atlanta.

During December 2014 an Israeli Jewish young man was stabbed in his neck while standing outside of the Chabad-Lubavitch building in New York City. Another antisemitic incident in New York occurred when a threatening photo was sent to a Hasidic Jewish lawmaker. The photo showed his head pasted on the body of a person beheaded by ISIS. Besides those incidents, several antisemitic graffiti found across the country, and a couple of synagogues were vandalized in Chicago and in Ocala, Florida.

1. Private residence (22.0%)
2. College Campus (7.00%)
3. Jewish Institution / School (11.0%)
4. Non-Jewish School (12.0%)
5. Public area (35.0%)
6. Private Building / Area (12.0%)
7. Cemetery (1.00%)

January 2015 started with some antisemitic graffiti throughout the country, such as racist writing on a car and on an elevator's button. In February, there were more incidents of antisemitic graffiti and harassment. In Sacramento, California, Israeli flags with a swastika were hung out of a house. An American flag with a swastika on it was also taped to the house's door. Earlier that month there were two incidents of antisemitic graffiti outside and inside the Jewish fraternity house at UC Davis. In Lakewood, NJ a Jewish-owned store was targeted with graffiti. That followed several other antisemitic messages found spray-painted and carved around town.

An incident at UCLA on February 10, 2015, where a Jewish student was questioned by a student council regarding whether being active in a Jewish organization constituted a "conflict of interest", illustrated the existing confusion among some students on this point.

In April 2015 the Anti-Defamation League published its 2014 audit of antisemitic incidents. It counted 912 antisemitic incidents across the U.S. during 2014, constituting a 21% increase from the year before. Most of the incidents belonged to the category of "harassments, threats and events". The audit shows that most of the vandalism incidents occurred in public areas (35%). A review of the results shows that during Operation Protective Edge, there was a significant increase in the number of antisemitic incidents, compares to the rest of the year. In all of these states, more antisemitic incidents were counted in 2014 than in 2013.

On January 2, 2018, a gay Jewish man named Blaze Bernstein was murdered by Samuel Woodward, who is a member of a neo-Nazi terrorist organization called Atomwaffen Division.

On October 27, 2018, 11 people were murdered in an attack on the Tree of Life – Or L'Simcha synagogue in Pittsburgh, Pennsylvania. The shooting was committed by Robert Bowers, a prolific user of the alt-tech social media service Gab where he promoted antisemitic tropes and conspiracy theories as well as the white nationalist doctrine of white genocide, which is claimed to be a Jewish conspiracy.

On April 27, 2019, the Chabad of Poway in California was attacked by a 19 year old gunman who killed 1 and injured 3. The shooter in question, John T. Earnest, had written an open letter which he posted on 8chan's /pol/ messageboard specifically blaming Jews for white genocide and other ills.

On December 10, 2019, a mass-shooting attack took place against a kosher grocery store in Jersey City, killing six (including both perpetrators). The attackers invoked tenets of an extremist version of Black Hebrew Israelite philosophy. In December 2019, the Jewish community of New York suffered a number of antisemitic attacks, including a mass stabbing in Monsey on the 28th.

In May 2021 there was an upsurge of antisemitic actions in the United States at the same time as the clashes between Israel and Hamas in Gaza.

On January 15, 2022, four people were taken hostage by a gunman at a synagogue in Colleyville, Texas. After a standoff with the police, the gunman, a British Pakistani, was killed and the hostages freed.

Later in 2022, right-wing political commentator Nick Fuentes blamed Jewish people themselves for antisemitic actions being carried out against the Jewish community. He further claimed that such actions would only get worse if "the Jews" did not support "people like us". Due to comments like these, Fuentes is regarded as an antisemite.

=== College campuses ===
On April 3, 2006, the U.S. Commission on Civil Rights announced its finding that incidents of antisemitism are a "serious problem" on college campuses throughout the United States.

Stephen H. Norwood likens what he describes as antisemitism in contemporary American universities to antisemitism in American campuses during the 1930s. His article says that anti-Zionist and antisemitic opinions are often conflated by pro-Palestine protesters imvoking the blood libel and attacks on Jewish students during protests.

During April 2014 there were at least 3 incidents of swastika drawings on Jewish property in University dormitories. At UCF for example, a Jewish student found 9 swastikas carved into walls of her apartment.

On the beginning of September 2014 there were two cases of antisemitism in College campuses: two students from East Carolina University sprayed swastika on the apartment door of a Jewish student, while on the same day, a Jewish student from the University of North Carolina at Charlotte was told "to go burn in an oven." The student had also told the media she is "hunted" because of her support in Israel: "I have been called a terrorist, baby killer, woman killer, [told that] I use blood to make matzah and other foods, Christ killer, occupier, and much more."

In October 2014 fliers were handed out in the University of California, Santa Barbara that claimed "9/11 Was an Outside Job" with a large blue Star of David. The fliers contained links to several websites that accused Israel of the attack. A few days later antisemitic graffiti was found on a Jewish fraternity house in Emory University. Another graffiti incident occurred in Northeastern University, where swastikas drawn on flyers for a school event.

A survey published in February 2015 by Trinity College and the Louis D. Brandeis Center for Human Rights Under Law found out that 54 percent of the participants had been subject to or witnessing antisemitism on their campus. The survey included 1,157 self-identified Jewish students at 55 campuses nationwide. The most significant origin for antisemitism, according to the survey was "from an individual student" (29 percent). Other origins were: in clubs/ societies, in lecture/ class, in student union, etc. The findings of the research compared to a parallel study conducted in United kingdom, and the results were similar.

In October 2015, it was reported that a few cars in the parking lot of the UC Davis were vandalized and scratched with antisemitic slurs and swastika sketches. A few days later, antisemitic slurs were found on a chalkboard in a center of the campus at Towson University.

=== Trump campaigns and presidency ===
During his 2016 presidential campaign and presidency, Trump was repeatedly criticized for antisemitism.

Jewish journalist Julia Ioffe received antisemitic death threats in 2016 after writing a profile of Melania Trump which revealed Melania Trump had a half-brother she was not in contact with. Neo-Nazi website The Daily Stormer denounced Ioffe as a "filthy Russian kike", while other Trump supporters made memes of Ioffe being executed in the Holocaust. Ioffe received an anonymous phone call from a person who played a Hitler speech. Melania Trump was critical of Ioffe for researching her relatives. When asked about Ioffe's antisemitic death threats, Melania Trump replied "I don't control my fans, but I don't agree with what they're doing. I understand what you mean, but there are people out there who maybe went too far. [Ioffe] provoked them."

In July 2016, Donald Trump tweeted an image of Hillary Clinton over a stack of dollar bills with a six-pointed star, saying "most corrupt candidate ever!" After being criticized by many Jewish communal leaders, his staff took down the tweet, replaced the star with a circle, and then reposted it. However, Trump regretted the decision to take down the star, remarking, "I would have rather defended it—just leave it up and say: No, that's not a Star of David. That's just a star."

In his 2017 inaugural speech, Trump stated, "from this day forward, it's only going to be America first. America first." This slogan was criticized for antisemitism because it referenced the "America First" policy taken by many American Nazi sympathizers during the second World War. Despite its history with antisemitism, this slogan has been continually used by Trump supporters to this day.

When questioned about his antisemitism, Trump responded by saying he is the "least antisemitic person you've ever seen in your entire life."

Steve Bannon, who was the CEO of Trump's 2016 campaign and later served in the Trump administration, was alleged by his ex-wife to have made antisemitic remarks in private. When Bannon was chief editor of Breitbart, he said that Breitbart was "the platform for the alt-right." Bannon employed alt-right author Milo Yiannopoulos at Breitbart and pushed him to make public appearances and speeches. Yiannopoulos was privately friendly with neo-Nazis and white supremacists, and surreptitiously promoted their ideas in his Breitbart articles before his ties to antisemitic alt-right figures, including Baked Alaska and Andrew Auernheimer, were exposed in October 2017. During the 2016 presidential election, antisemitic personalities on the alt-right saw the Trump campaign as an opportunity to promote their views. Jewish commentator Ben Shapiro, who resigned from Breitbart in 2016, accused Bannon of "making common cause with the racist, anti-Semitic alt-right." Yiannapoulos launched a series of personal attacks against Shapiro after his resignation, which coincided with Shapiro receiving a wave of antisemitic abuse. When protests against a planned speech by Yiannapoulos in February 2017 turned violent, President Trump threatened to pull funding from UC Berkeley, tweeting that "If U.C. Berkeley does not allow free speech and practices violence on innocent people with a different point of view – NO FEDERAL FUNDS?"

In August 2017, the Unite the Right rally took place in Charlottesville, Virginia. During the rally, neo-Nazis chanted antisemitic slogans such as "Jews will not replace us!" and "Blood and soil!" The rally quickly turned violent and 30 protestors were injured on the first day. On the second day, a white supremacist ran his car into a crowd of counterprotestors, killing Heather Heyer and injuring 35 people. Trump sparked national outrage by claiming there were "very fine people on both sides." After his statement initiated national outcry, he stated, "racism is evil" and specifically condemned the Ku Klux Klan and white nationalists.

During the Trump presidency, the QAnon conspiracy theory became popular. The theory claims that a powerful cabal of cannibalistic child molesters are conspiring against Trump. Believers think Trump is secretly fighting this cabal of pedophiles. They also believe that this cabal harvests adrenochrome from children they kill, which is directly related to traditional antisemitic blood libel conspiracy theories. QAnoners also believe that Jewish billionaire George Soros and infamous Jewish banking family the Rothschilds are implicated in this conspiracy theory. The Anti-Defamation League has stated that QAnon has had a massive impact on American politics, saying "the damage has already been done. Many of QAnon's most notable claims have already made it into the mainstream, where its toxic impact on our national politics will be felt for decades to come." Academic Gregory Stanton has called QAnon "a rebranded version of the Protocols of the Elders of Zion" and called QAnon a "Nazi cult". A supporter of QAnon was initially scheduled to speak at the 2020 Republican National Convention, but was disinvited after she endorsed an antisemitic Twitter thread which falsely claimed the Protocols of the Elders of Zion is an authentic document. A Qualtrics survey found that supporters of QAnon tend to hold antisemitic beliefs. Numerous believers in QAnon participated in the storming of the U.S. Capitol on January 6. While Donald Trump said in 2020 he was unfamiliar with the tenets of QAnon, he said that believers in QAnon are "people that love our country" and that he appreciated their support. According to Media Matters, Trump amplified QAnon-supporting accounts on Twitter at least 315 times. After being banned from Twitter in 2021, Trump continued to amplify QAnon content on Truth Social.

In December 2019, Trump signed the Executive Order on Combating Anti-Semitism, which uses the IHRA definition of antisemitism. Early reports of the executive order claimed the order defined Judaism as a nationality, sparking criticism and fear amongst the Jewish criticism for its similarities to Nazi-era policies. However, this turned out to not be the case. The order has sparked controversy amongst antizionist activists for appearing to combat speech against Israel rather than antisemitism.

Trump has repeatedly criticized the majority of Jewish-American voters who support the Democratic Party. In 2019, 2021, 2022, 2023, and 2024, Trump made a series of comments disparaging Jewish Democrats as "disloyal", claiming they were insufficiently appreciative of his administration's support for Israel. Trump suggested Jewish Democrats were betraying Israel by supporting the Democratic Party's alleged hostility towards Israel. Trump has declared that "Any Jewish person that votes for Democrats hates their religion." and that Jewish Democrats "hate Israel." Biden administration officials have condemned Trump's rhetoric as antisemitic. Trump has also praised several people who have made antisemitic comments, including Henry Ford, Michelle Malkin, Paul Nehlen, Jack Posobiec, Ann Coulter, and Ted Nugent, he has also shared posts from multiple antisemitic social media accounts. In 2017, Trump endorsed the Philippine drug war, telling President of the Philippines Rodrigo Duterte he was doing an "unbelievable job on the drug problem." Duterte had compared the drug war to the Holocaust in 2016, saying he wished to kill millions of drug users just as Hitler killed millions of Jews. According to Trump's former Chief of Staff John F. Kelly, Trump made favorable remarks about Adolf Hitler in private, saying that "Hitler did some good things."

Numerous participants in the January 6 United States Capitol attack wore clothing with antisemitic slogans or had a history of expressing antisemitic sentiment. Members of the antisemitic Proud Boys participated in the attack. Antisemitic activist Baked Alaska pleaded guilty to participating in the riot. Riley Williams, who was sentenced to prison for stealing Nancy Pelosi's laptop during the attack, was a self-identified "Groyper" and supporter of white supremacist Nick Fuentes. Fuentes himself and his supporters were present outside the Capitol on January 6. Neo-Nazi Timothy Hale-Cusanelli was sentenced to prison for his participation in the attack. In 2022, Hale-Cusanelli's aunt spoke at a Pennsylvania rally headlined by Donald Trump and called for her nephew's release from prison.

The Proud Boys were founded by Gavin McInnes, who once released a video entitled "10 things I hate about the Jews." Numerous members of the Proud Boys have ties to racist and antisemitic groups, including former member Jason Kessler, organizer of the Unite the Right rally in Charlottesville. The Proud Boys have collaborated with Republican Party organizations in New York, Nevada, Oregon, and Florida. Trump adviser Roger Stone is a member of the Proud Boys. During the 2020 United States presidential debates Joe Biden asked Donald Trump to condemn the Proud Boys, to which Trump replied "Proud Boys, stand back and stand by." The comment was interpreted by members of the Proud Boys as a gesture of support for the organization by Trump. Trump has suggested he would pardon Enrique Tarrio, leader of the Proud Boys, who was sentenced to twenty two years in prison for his involvement in the January 6 Capitol attack.

In 2022, four elected officials—Representatives Marjorie Taylor Greene, Paul Gosar, Lieutenant Governor of Idaho Janice McGeachin, and state senator Wendy Rogers—attended the America First Political Action Conference, which was hosted by Nick Fuentes and is associated with the antisemitic Groyper movement. Greene, Gosar, and Rogers have all been accused of antisemitism. All three politicians were endorsed in their re-election campaigns by Donald Trump, while Trump also endorsed McGeachin's candidacy for Governor of Idaho. Another candidate Trump endorsed in 2022, Pennsylvania gubernatorial candidate Doug Mastriano, supported antisemitic social media website Gab and attacked his opponent, Josh Shapiro, for sending his children to a Jewish private school. During the 2022 midterms, QAnon supporter and Republican nominee for Nevada Secretary of State Jim Marchant organized the America First Secretary of State Coalition, a slate of Trump-supporting Republican candidates for state secretaries of state in fourteen states who supported the false theory that the 2020 United States presidential election was stolen. The coalition also endorsed Mastriano and Arizona gubernatorial candidate Kari Lake. In 2024, Marchant endorsed an antisemitic conspiracy theory about a secretive Jewish cabal controlling America's financial system. In 2022 congressional candidate Carl Paladino, who called Hitler "the kind of leader we need today", received the endorsement of Elise Stefanik, chair of the House Republican Conference.

=== Kanye West ===
In late 2022, the American rapper Kanye West stirred up a national controversy over his continuous antisemitic remarks. On October 3, 2022, West showed off a "white lives matter" shirt, a slogan which is commonly used by white supremacists. On October 6, 2022, West conducted an interview with Fox News commentator Tucker Carlson, in which he made various antisemitic and otherwise conspiratorial statements. On October 7, 2022, he implied in an Instagram post that Puff Daddy was being controlled by Jews. The next day, after being banned from Instagram, West tweeted out that he was going to go "death con 3 on Jewish people" and that he can't be antisemitic because "Black people are the real Jews." Multiple celebrities, such as Jamie Lee Curtis, publicly condemned his antisemitic rant.

A few days later, an episode of LeBron James' show, The Shop: Uninterrupted, was cut from the air due to West's antisemitic comments. When news broke about West's recently public antisemitic remarks, Van Lathan, a former TMZ staffer and host of the Higher Learning podcast, wrote that he was unsurprised about Kanye's comments and that an episode of his podcast had previously been unaired due to West remarking that he "loved Hitler and the Nazis."

As a result of his antisemitic rampages, multiple companies and celebrities publicly denounced and cut ties from West. On October 21, 2022, Balenciaga publicly cut their ties with West. A few days later, West's ex-wife, Kim Kardashian spoke out, saying, "Hate speech is never OK or excusable. I stand together with the Jewish community and call on the terrible violence and hateful rhetoric towards them to come to an immediate end." On that same day, MRC announced that it would not release a finished documentary on West as he "has now helped mainstream" antisemitism. On October 25, 2022, Adidas announced that they were cutting their ties from West. West was also dropped by Foot Locker, TJ Maxx, Madame Tussauds, and more.

On November 22, 2022, West dined with the former President Donald Trump and white nationalist Nick Fuentes, stirring up even more controversy around the country. Trump wrote on his social media platform that he "never knew and knew nothing about" Fuentes and, of West, "...we got along great, he expressed no anti-Semitism, & I appreciated all of the nice things he said about me on 'Tucker Carlson.'"

On December 1, 2022, West went on Alex Jones's show InfoWars. On this show, West claimed that he saw "good things about Hitler." In response to West's comments on the show, President Joe Biden tweeted, "I just want to make a few things clear: The Holocaust happened. Hitler was a demonic figure. And instead of giving it a platform, our political leaders should be calling out and rejecting antisemitism wherever it hides. Silence is complicity."

West had previously received support from congressional Republicans when the Twitter account of the House Judiciary Committee posted "Kanye. Elon. Trump." after West was photographed wearing a "White Lives Matter" t-shirt. The tweet was deleted after West praised Hitler.

On December 26, 2023, months after his very long antisemitic outburst, West wrote a public apology to the Jewish community in Hebrew on Instagram. Adidas, who had been in a years-long legal battle with West over his antisemitic comments, formally ended the battle in October 2024.

=== Elon Musk and Twitter/X ===
Elon Musk has been repeatedly criticized for antisemitic tweets and for allowing a massive surge in antisemitism on his social media platform, X (formerly known as Twitter). Studies have shown that right after Musk bought the social media, antisemitic tweets immediately increased dramatically. After Musk bought Twitter, the website restored several accounts previously banned for extremism, including multiple accounts belonging to neo-Nazis.

The Anti-Defamation League has repeatedly expressed concerns about Musk's personal antisemitism and the persistence of antisemitism on the platform. In response to these concerns, Musk tweeted, "Since the acquisition, The @ADL has been trying to kill this platform by falsely accusing it & me of being anti-Semitic. Our US advertising revenue is still down 60%, primarily due to pressure on advertisers by @ADL (that's what advertisers tell us), so they almost succeeded in killing X/Twitter! If this continues, we will have no choice but to file a defamation suit against, ironically, the 'Anti-Defamation' League." After Musk tweeted this, a campaign called #BanTheADL trended on X/Twitter. Musk liked a tweet by Keith O'Brien, who once called himself "a raging antisemite", endorsing the #BanTheADL campaign.

On November 17, 2023, Musk endorsed a tweet claiming that Jews are pushing "hatred of whites" and "hordes of minorities" into the Western world, causing him to be widely condemned by the Jewish community for antisemitism. Importantly, this was during a massive uptick in antisemitism that began during the 2023 Hamas-led attack on Israel only a month prior. After being widely condemned, Musk agreed to visit Auschwitz in January 2024. During the visit, he expressed that he had been "naive" on antisemitism, yet insisted that he sees "no antisemitism" in his circles on X. In 2024, Musk declared his opposition to the prosecution of far-right European politicians, including Dries Van Langenhove and Bjorn Hocke, who had been criminally charged for espousing Nazi rhetoric. In 2024, X intervened to remove numerous posts which revealed the identity of neo-Nazi cartoonist Stonetoss.

=== Diversity, equity, and inclusion (DEI) ===
Diversity, equity, and inclusion (DEI) programs on college campuses have been accused of ignoring or even contributing to antisemitism. Critics alleged that in general they do not include antisemitism as an evil to be fought, that they do not include Jews as an oppressed group, and that they sometimes include Jews as an oppressor group. The relationship between DEI and campus antisemitism came under further scrunity after the October 7 attacks, and the subsequent Gaza war.

Tabia Lee, a former DEI director at De Anza College in California and DEI critic, has claimed that DEI frameworks foster antisemitism due to its "oppressors and the oppressed" dichotomy where "Jews are categorically placed in the oppressor category", and described as "white oppressors". She has claimed that her attempts to include Jews under the "DEI" umbrella was resisted. When her critics asked the college trustees to oust her from her role, one counselor explicitly referenced her attempts to place Jewish students "on the same footing as marginalized groups". The Brandeis Center likewise notes how the DEI committee at Stanford University alleged that "Jews, unlike other minority group[s], possess privilege and power, Jews and victims of Jew-hatred do not merit or necessitate the attention of the DEI committee", after two students complained about antisemitic incidents on campus.

Following a widely reported perception that antisemitic incidents on American campuses had increased in 2023, several Republican congressmen laid the blame at DEI, with Burgess Owens stating DEI programs "are anything but inclusive for Jews". DEI's lack of inclusion for Jews, and contribution to fueling antisemitism, was similarly criticized by businessman Bill Ackman, and columnist Heather Mac Donald. Following the antisemitism controversy at the University of Pennsylvania, one donor pulled a $100 million donation "because he thought the school was prioritizing D.E.I. over enhancing the business school's academic excellence."

Supporters of DEI have alleged that the Trump administration's opposition to DEI policies does not help Jews and that opposition to antisemitism is being invoked to justify attacking academic freedom and the defunding of universities. Wesleyan University president Michael S. Roth has said that Trump is "using antisemitism as a cloak" as part of an effort to force universities to "express loyalty to the president". The historian and antisemitism scholar Lila Corwin Berman called Trump's claims to combat antisemitism an "irony", given his anti-DEI measures were forcing universities to gut DEI inititaives dedicated to opposing antisemitism.

=== Reactions to Israel, Hamas and the war in Gaza, 2023–present ===
In December 2023, the Anti-Defamation League (ADL) reported a 337% increase in incidents they recorded as antisemitic since the 2023 Hamas-led attack on Israel. However, these numbers have been viewed as controversial because the ADL has recorded that protests led by Jewish organizations such as Jewish Voice for Peace and IfNotNow as antisemitic. Some chants which have been shouted by supporters of the Pro-Palestine movement, such as "From the river to the sea" have been deemed antisemitic by institutions such as the ADL.

In response to an increase in antisemitic incidents, particularly on college campuses, the US Congress passed House Resolution 894 on December 12, 2023, claiming that antizionism is antisemitism and urging world leaders to fight against antisemitism.

Under intense pressure at a Congressional hearing, the presidents of Harvard University and the University of Pennsylvania gave weak answers to the allegations of antisemitism on their Ivy League campuses. President Claudine Gay of Harvard and President Liz Magill of Pennsylvania were forced to resign in January 2024. In February, Representative Virginia Foxx, a North Carolina Republican and chair of the House education committee, attacked Harvard. Foxx stated that its "Jewish students continue to endure the firestorm of antisemitism that has engulfed its campus. ... Congress will not tolerate antisemitic hate in its classrooms or on campus."

In an op-ed about rising antisemitism on campuses, Dara Horn wrote, "The through line of anti-Semitism for thousands of years has been the denial of truth and the promotion of lies. These lies range in scope from conspiracy theories to Holocaust denial to the blood libel to the currently popular claims that Zionism is racism, that Jews are settler colonialists, and that Jewish civilization isn't indigenous to the land of Israel. These lies are all part of the foundational big lie: that anti-Semitism itself is a righteous act of resistance against evil, because Jews are collectively evil and have no right to exist. Today, the big lie is winning."

Throughout the United States, there have been many instances of posters of hostages being ripped down, Jewish people being assaulted, antisemitic graffiti and vandalism, and bomb threats against Jewish community centers.

Additionally, there has been an increase in denial of the 2023 Hamas-led attack on Israel, with false suggestions that the IDF and the Mossad faked the attacks or that those killed in the attack were principally victims of friendly fire circulating online. According to Haaretz, disproven atrocity stories, such as the Hamas baby beheading hoax and stories of the burning alive of Israeli children, have further strengthened this false narrative.

As a result of this uptick in antisemitism, many Jewish people have reported feeling unsafe in the US. Recent studies by the American Jewish Committee have reported that 78% of American Jews felt unsafe upon hearing about the Hamas-led attack, with 46% claiming that they have altered their behavior out of fear of antisemitism.

== See also ==
- Antisemitic trope, false allegations
  - Stereotypes of Jews
- Anti-Zionism, attacking the state of Israel
- Geography of antisemitism § United States
- History of antisemitism, worldwide
- History of the Jews in the United States
- Antisemitism in the United States in the 21st century
- List of antisemitic incidents in the United States
- List of attacks on Jewish institutions in the United States
- United States and the Holocaust
- Israel–United States relations
- Religious discrimination in the United States
- African American–Jewish relations
