= United States and the Holocaust =

National relation to the Holocaust

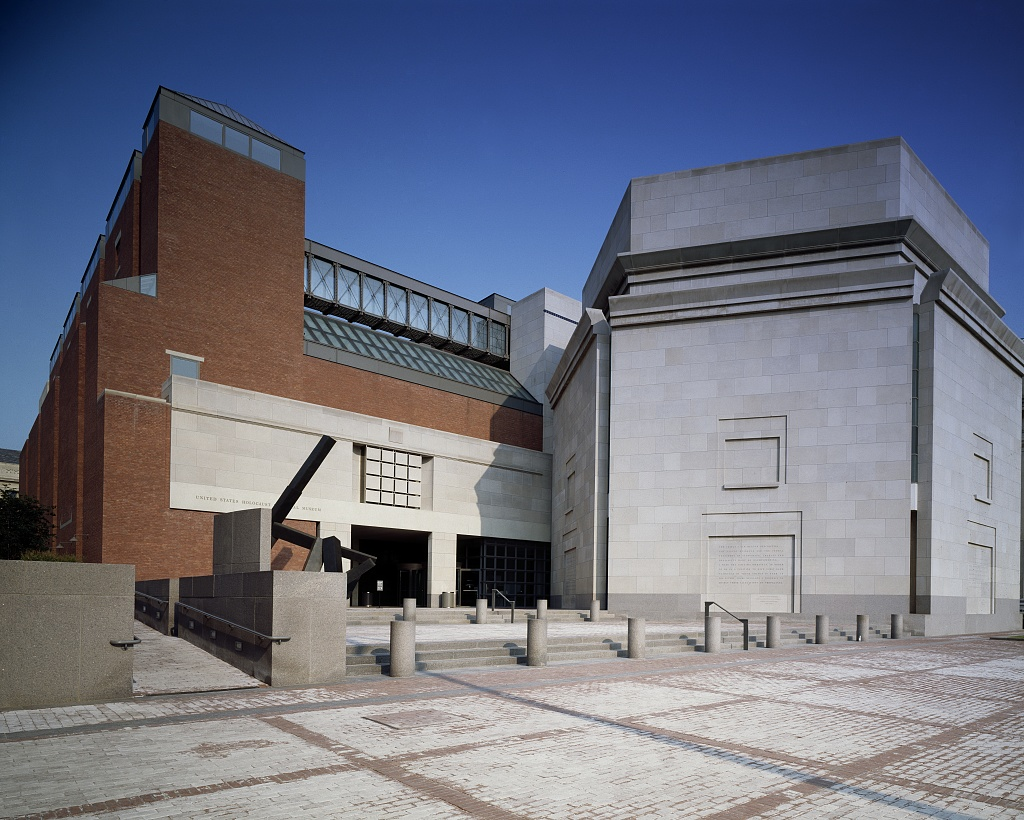
The U.S. Holocaust Memorial Museum in Washington, D.C.

A neutral state, the United States entered the war on the Allied side in December 1941. The American government first became aware of the Holocaust in German-occupied Europe in 1942 and 1943. Following a report on the failure to assist the Jewish people by the Department of State, the War Refugee Board was created in 1944 to assist refugees from the Nazis. As one of the most powerful Allied states, the United States played a major role in the military defeat of Nazi Germany and the subsequent Nuremberg trials. The Holocaust saw increased awareness in the 1970s that instilled its prominence in the collective memory of the American people continuing to the present day. The United States has been criticized for taking insufficient action in response to the Jewish refugee crisis in the 1930s and the Holocaust during World War II.

== Background ==
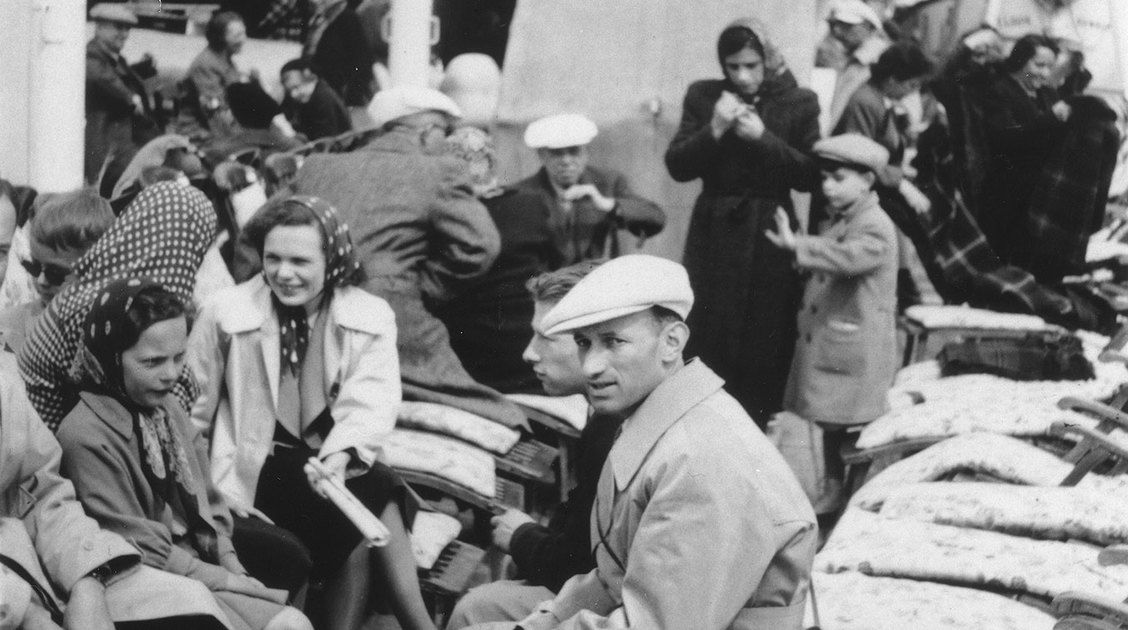
Jewish refugees on the St. Louis

In 1924, the Johnson-Reed Act was passed, limiting immigration to the United States. In July 1938, the United States initiated the Évian Conference to address the refugee crisis with the nations of Europe and the Americas, but no consensus could be reached between the countries. In the aftermath of Kristallnacht in November 1938, Gallup found that at the time, 94% of Americans disapproved of the mistreatment of Jews in Nazi Germany, but only 21% of Americans supported increasing Jewish immigration to the United States. Isolationism was the dominant foreign policy at the time, and the people of the United States generally opposed involvement in foreign affairs and they also opposed increased immigration. This fact has been attributed to economic concerns which resulted from the Great Depression and an antisemitic prejudice which was held by a sizable portion of the population.

Following Kristallnacht, Secretary of the Interior Harold L. Ickes proposed relocating European Jews to Alaska. The government had been seeking solutions to increase the development of Alaska, and its status as a territory would allow the refugees to circumvent immigration quotas. The plan, laid out in the Slattery Report, was opposed by Jews and non-Jews in the United States, and it was never adopted as a result. Another initiative which the United States took to try to help Jewish refugees was the introduction of the Wagner–Rogers Bill in 1938, which would have authorized 20,000 refugee children from Germany to enter the United States. The bill was highly controversial, and it never reached a vote in Congress.

In 1939, German Jewish citizens boarded the passenger ship St. Louis and traveled to Cuba in an attempt to escape Nazi persecution. Despite the fact that they had the paperwork which enabled them to enter Cuba, only 29 passengers were allowed to off board, including those passengers who had US visas. The United States intervened on behalf of the passengers in an attempt to persuade the Cuban government to permit them to enter Cuba, but the Cuban government broke off the negotiations. Neither the United States nor Canada permitted the passengers to enter as an exception to immigration laws, so the ship was forced to return to Europe where the passengers were off boarded in the United Kingdom, the Netherlands, Belgium, and France. Of the 907 passengers who were returned to Europe, 254 were murdered in the Holocaust and one was killed in an air raid.

By the time the United States entered World War II, it had admitted more refugees from Nazism than any other country in the world. Approximately 1,000 unaccompanied Jewish children were admitted to the United States between 1934 and 1936.

== Domestic response ==
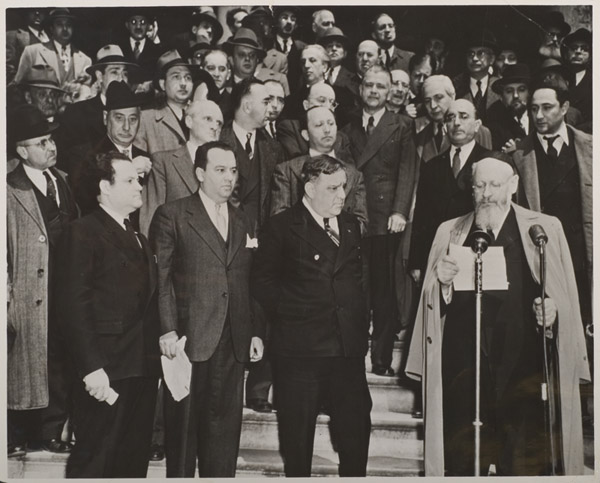
Public commemorations of the first anniversary of the Warsaw Ghetto Uprising in New York City on 19 April 1944

The prevalence of antisemitism in German society was widely known by the 1930s, but citizens of the United States were unaware that the Holocaust was taking place for the first year. Several individuals attempted to contact the government of the United States and other governments to inform them of the Holocaust after it began in 1941. In his last telegram to the United States following the Invasion of Yugoslavia, the United States ambassador to the Kingdom of Yugoslavia, Arthur Bliss Lane reported that both Jews and Serbs were being persecuted in Zagreb. In June 1941, a Standard Oil company employee who had recently left Zagreb provided evidence of persecutions conducted by the Independent State of Croatia (NDH) against Jews and Serbs to the United States delegation in Geneva. Both the telegram and evidence submitted in Geneva did not mention deaths or executions that would later form part of the Holocaust and genocide of Serbs in the NDH. By the beginning of 1942, secretary of state Cordell Hull was receiving daily updates from the United States consul-general Sam Honaker in Istanbul of both Jews and Serbs being killed in the NDH. Despite the numerous reports, the United States did not react.

In August 1942, Gerhart M. Riegner sent the Riegner Telegram to the United States and the United Kingdom, indicating a suspicion that Nazi Germany may attempt to kill the Jewish people of Europe. Suspicions of Nazi atrocities against the Jews were given credibility after Raczyński's Note was published in December 1942 and Witold's Report offered the first detailed report of the Holocaust in April 1943. The full extent of the Holocaust was not known until after it concluded at the end of World War II.

In January 1944, Assistant Secretary of the Treasury Josiah E. DuBois Jr. authored a report detailing how certain officials within the Department of State had worked to prevent assistance to Jewish refugees and obscure information about the Holocaust. In response, President Roosevelt created the War Refugee Board as an independent agency to help Jewish refugees. From August 1944 to February 1946, 982 refugees from eighteen countries were interned at Fort Ontario Emergency Refugee Shelter as Operation Safe Haven. American rescue efforts in the final year of World War II are credited as saving tens of thousands of lives.

While many American newspapers showed concern for the atrocities committed against European Jews, The New York Times gave it a low priority, and stories about Jews in Europe rarely appeared on the front page. News of Jewish rights as a whole was often relegated to lesser importance in the context of military campaigns, and the contradictory nature of the reports which were coming out of Europe made reporting on the subject difficult. After it was reported that over two million Jews had been killed in Europe, We Will Never Die was written by Ben Hecht and performed in Madison Square Garden to spread awareness of the Holocaust. Subsequent performances took place across the United States in the summer of 1943, and over 100,000 Americans witnessed the pageant.

Many individuals and organizations in the United States contributed to refugee assistance and relief activities. Religious groups such as the Quakers and the Unitarians assisted in rescue efforts.

== Strategic bombing and the Western European Campaign ==
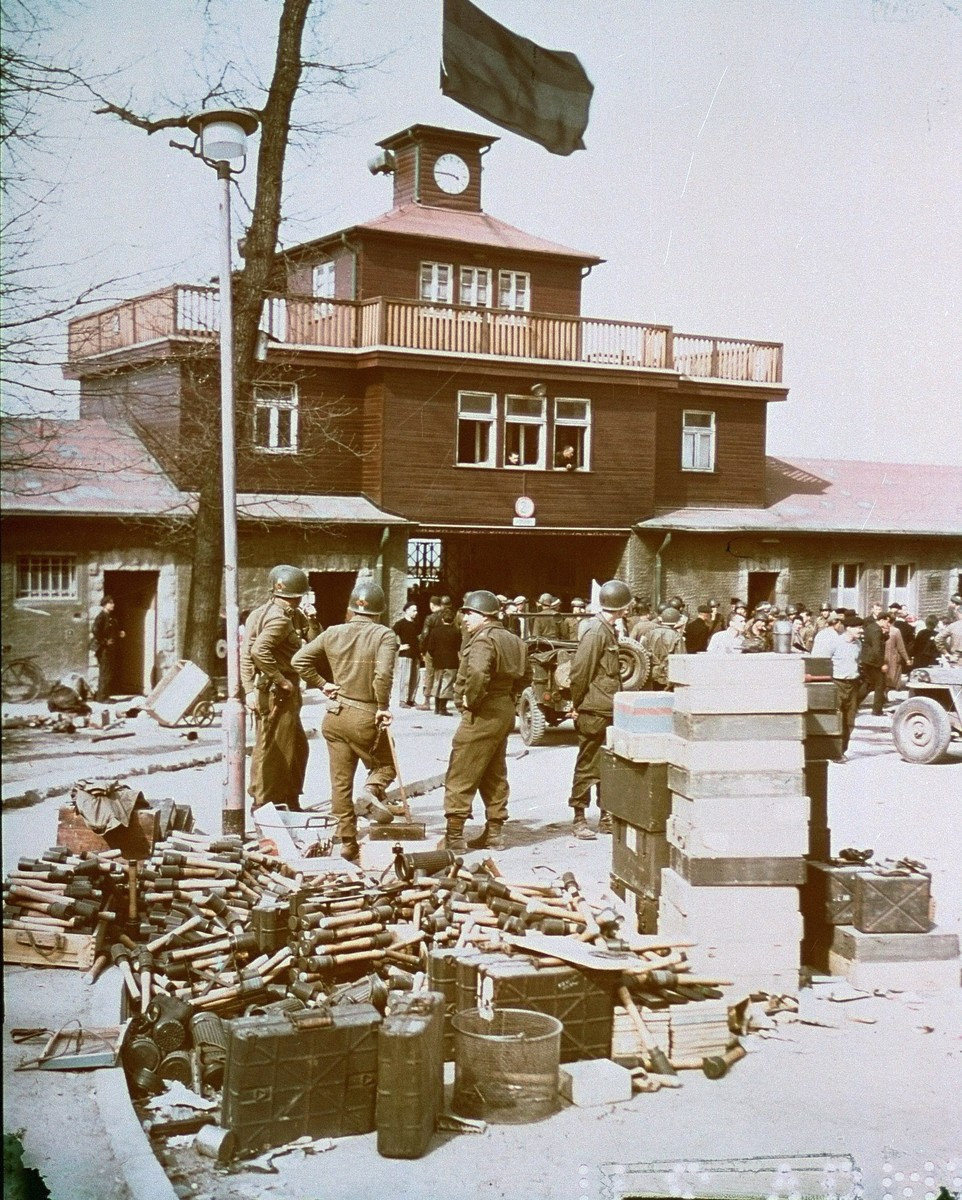
American soldiers oversee the disestablishment of Buchenwald concentration camp.

During the strategic bombing of Germany by the Allies in World War II, some Jewish leaders advocated the bombing of Auschwitz concentration camp. The United States and the United Kingdom developed the capacity to reach Auschwitz with strategic bombing in July 1944. The United States declined to bomb Auschwitz, citing technical and strategic concerns, including the insufficient accuracy of strategic bombing and the risk of prolonging the war by diverting resources away from military targets.

In rare cases, American prisoners of war were sent to concentration camps. Approximately 9,000 Jewish Americans were captured as prisoners of war in Nazi Germany. While most were sent to standard prisoner-of-war camps that ratified the Geneva Convention (1929), mostly due to reciprocity concerns, those identified as Jewish were sent to concentration camps. Most notably, 350 Americans were segregated from Stalag IX-B and sent to the Berga an der Elster subcamp at Buchenwald concentration camp on February 8, 1945, where they were subjected to "Extermination through labour". American dog tags during World War II identified the religious beliefs of each soldier, and Jewish Americans were forced to decide if they should lie about their religion or carry their dog tags on missions at all. African American Prisoners of War were often singled out for more harsh labor than their white counterparts, and sometimes transfer to concentration camps.

The United States military freed the prisoners of the concentration camps in Western Germany in April and May 1945, including Buchenwald, Dachau, Mittelbau-Dora, Flossenbürg, and Mauthausen concentration camps. Their complete liberation was not immediate, and significant numbers of survivors remained at the camps for months without adequate food, clothing o, or medical care. For several months after their liberation, in accordance with official American military policy, a number of the camps continued to be heavily surrounded by barbed wire and guarded by armed American servicemen instructed to shoot escapees, as had the German guards that previously guarded the camps, though only two cases of such shooting have been documented.

Earl G. Harrison, a lawyer, Dean of the University of Pennsylvania Law School and the former U.S. Immigration Commissioner under Franklin Roosevelt confirmed in the Harrison Report of August 1945, four months after their liberation, that "displaced Jews are being held in unsanitary, barbed-wire camps, wearing hideous concentration camp garb or discarded German SS uniforms, with nothing being done for them by way of rehabilitation." The report continued, "One is led to wonder whether the German people, seeing this, are not supposing that we (Americans) are not following or at least condoning Nazi policy." Coming over seven months after the unconditional surrender of Germany, the Truman Directive of December 22, 1945, among other objectives, intended to set the United States as an example to the World by vastly increasing and expediting the admission of displaced persons to the United States, and to open U.S. immigration to full use. Shipments of food and medicine to the camps had increased before the issuance of the Truman Doctrine and began to significantly improve by the Fall of 1945.

The Ohrdruf facility of the Buchenwald concentration camp was the first to be discovered by American soldiers. Upon finding and liberating the camp, soldiers worked to feed the prisoners and treat them for illness. Generals Eisenhower, Bradley, and Patton arrived to inspect the site on April 12, and a documentation process began soon after. Journalist Edward R. Murrow arrived the same day to begin recording the facilities and broadcasting the findings.

== Post-war ==
As the end of World War II in Europe approached, the Allied powers debated the best response to the crimes of the Nazi Party's leadership. The Soviet Union advocated a show trial and the United Kingdom advocated summary execution, but the United States advocated a fair trial and an agreement was made to hold a trial which would be founded on common law. The Nuremberg trials were held in 1945 and 1946 to this end, and Supreme Court justice Robert H. Jackson was selected as the chief prosecutor representing the United States. Following the trials of Nazi leadership, the Allied powers could not come to an agreement on trials for other individuals involved in the Holocaust, so the United States held the subsequent Nuremberg trials unilaterally between 1946 and 1949 through military tribunals. During these trials, the United States prosecuted many additional perpetrators, including Nazi doctors, Nazi judges, industrialists, and military officers.

In the immediate aftermath of World War II, reports and photographs of the Holocaust served to emphasize the evil of the Nazis in the American consciousness. The democratization of West Germany and the onset of the Cold War caused the Soviet Union to replace Germany as the primary example of evil and totalitarianism in American rhetoric. Attention toward the Holocaust briefly resurged in 1961 during the Eichmann trial in Israel, and this event is credited for establishing the association of the Holocaust with the Jewish people specifically. A Holocaust awareness movement led by Jewish activists developed in the 1970s, resulting in the establishment of the Holocaust as a major event in the American consciousness. The Holocaust has persisted in the collective memory of the American people into the 21st century, and it has also been cited as a rare example of a historical event that has become more prominent in society as time passes.

Dozens of Holocaust memorials and museums exist in the United States. According to a 2020 Pew Research Center report, 84% of American adults are able to accurately describe the Holocaust, 69% were able to identify which part of the 20th century the Holocaust occurred in, and 45% were able to correctly identify how many Jews were killed in the Holocaust.

=== Panel discussions ===
- Diplomacy, Dissent, and the Holocaust: Speaking Out, Then and Now full transcript of US State Dept panel discussion on State Dept efforts in the Holocaust.

== See also ==
- Antisemitism in the United States § Holocaust denial
- Diplomatic history of World War II § United States
- Fascism in the United States
- Foreign policy of the United States § World War II
- History of antisemitism in the United States § The Holocaust
- International response to the Holocaust § United States
- Military history of the United States § World War II (1941–1945)
- United States home front during World War II

== Bibliography ==
- Ngai, Mae (2009). "The Johnson Reed Act of 1924 and the Reconstruction of Race and Immigration Law". In Janice A. Radway; Kevin Gaines; Barry Shank; Penny Von Eschen (eds.). American Studies: An Anthology. Wiley. ISBN 9781405113519.
- Novick, Peter (1999). The Holocaust in American life. Boston: Houghton Mifflin. ISBN 9780547349619.
- Greene, Daniel; Phillips, Edward, eds. (2022). Americans and the Holocaust: A Reader. New Brunswick: Rutgers University Press. ISBN 9781978821682.
- Peck, Sarah E. (1980). "The Campaign for an American Response to the Nazi Holocaust, 1943-1945". Journal of Contemporary History. 15 (2): 367–400. ISSN 0022-0094. JSTOR 260518.
