= John W. Pehle =

American lawyer and politician (1909–1999)

Director of the War Refugee Board
- In office 1944–1945
- President: Franklin D. Roosevelt
- Preceded by: Position created
- Succeeded by: William O'Dwyer

Personal details
- Born: February 2, 1909 Minneapolis, Minnesota, U.S.
- Died: March 24, 1999 (aged 90) Bethesda, Maryland, U.S.
- Education: Creighton University (BA); Yale Law School (LLB, JD)

John W. Pehle (1909 – 1999) was an American United States Department of the Treasury lawyer and one of the authors of the Report to the Secretary on the Acquiescence of This Government in the Murder of the Jews, a 1944 document exposing the United States Department of State's alleged cover-up of the Holocaust. As the first director of the War Refugee Board, Pehle helped save the lives of tens of thousands of European Jews who would have otherwise died at the hands of the Germans in the last two years of the Second World War.

== Early life and education ==
John Pehle was born in Minneapolis, Minnesota to German immigrant Franz Otto Herman Pehle (1881–1956) and Minnesota-born Agnes M. Flodquist (1880–1953). John and his three siblings grew up in Omaha, Nebraska, where in 1920 the census shows their father managed a biscuit company.

Pehle earned a Bachelor of Arts degree from Creighton University, followed by a Bachelor of Laws and Juris Doctor from Yale Law School.

== Government Service ==
In the summer of 1943, Pehle was a staffer at the Treasury Department, reporting directly to Secretary Henry Morgenthau Jr. Pehle and his colleagues in a unit called the Foreign Fund Control became convinced that the U.S. State Department was ignoring warnings of the mass slaughter of Jews under the Nazi regime. Specifically, Assistant Secretary Breckenridge Long, was actively blocking any efforts to rescue Jewish refugees and burying evidence of his obstructionism.

Pehle and his colleagues helped Morgenthau marshal the evidence of State Department intransigence and present it to President Franklin D. Roosevelt in January 1944. Originally titled with the fiery phrase, Report to the Secretary on the Acquiescence of this Government in the Murder of the Jews, the final draft of the briefing memorandum was headed, "Personal Report to the President." As a result of that briefing, Roosevelt created the War Refugee Board, and placed Pehle in charge as its first executive director. Pehle’s advocacy had played a large part in convincing Roosevelt to finally act, according to the PBS documentary "The U.S. and the Holocaust."

The War Refugee Board, nominally co-headed by the U.S. Secretaries of State, War, and Treasury, operated between January 22, 1944, and September 15, 1945. Like Pehle, however, most of the Board’s staff were Treasury Department employees. After years of official inaction in the matter of the extermination of European Jews by the Nazis and their Axis collaborators, the War Refugee Board streamlined the work of private relief agencies, helping them send money and resources into neutral and enemy territory. They also placed American representatives in neutral nations to supervise projects, and to pressure these countries to welcome refugees.

The War Refugee Board was the first and only official American response to the Holocaust. Winning World War II, however, remained the Allied priority. According to the Holocaust Encyclopedia authored by the United States Holocaust Memorial Museum, the War Refugee Board was a significant attempt to rescue and relieve Jews and other endangered people under German occupation. Though not created until 1944, the establishment of the WRB provided a clear and coherent U.S. rescue policy.

After the war, many - including John Pehle himself – called the Board’s actions “little and late.” But while we cannot know how many lives might have been saved had the Board been created earlier, for those lives the Board did save, and for the thousands more aided through the Board’s relief work, the authors of the Holocaust Encyclopedia believe that the efforts of John Pehle and his co-workers should not be minimized.

== Private Practice ==
Early in 1945, Pehle left the War Refugee Board, where he was succeeded by William O'Dwyer.

In 1946 he entered private practice, as a senior partner in the Washington, D.C., law firm of Pehle & Lesser and successor firms; and, later, in the Washington office of Morgan, Lewis & Bockius.

John Pehle was not an “all work, no play” man: He was an avid golfer and a member of the Congressional Country Club.

== Later life and death ==
His wife, Franche Elser Pehle, died in 1995.

According to his obituary in the Washington Post, John Pehle died of cancer at the age of 90 in Bethesda, Maryland on March 24, 1999.

In 2006 John Pehle was the subject of H.R.5011, which was meant to award him, posthumously, a Congressional Gold Medal in recognition of his contributions to the Nation in helping rescue Jews and other minorities from the Holocaust during World War II. However, while the legislative text recited in detail Pehle's extraordinary accomplishments, the bill found little support in the Republican-controlled House and Senate; the bill was never referred out of the Subcommittee on Domestic and International Monetary Policy, Trade, and Technology.
