= The U.S. and the Holocaust =

American documentary television series

- Genre: Documentary
- Written by: Geoffrey Ward
- Directed by: Ken Burns; Lynn Novick; Sarah Botstein
- Voices of: Liam Neeson; Matthew Rhys; Paul Giamatti; Meryl Streep; Werner Herzog; Joe Morton; Hope Davis; Bradley Whitford; Adam Arkin; Helena Zengel
- Narrated by: Peter Coyote
- Country of origin: United States
- No. of episodes: 3

Production
- Executive producer: Ken Burns
- Running time: 395 minutes/6 hours 58 minutes

Original release
- Network: PBS
- Release: September 18 – September 21, 2022

The U.S. and the Holocaust is a 2022 three-part documentary miniseries about the United States' response to the Holocaust. The series was directed by Ken Burns, Lynn Novick, and Sarah Botstein, and was written by frequent Burns collaborator Geoffrey C. Ward.

The miniseries premiered on PBS on September 18, 20, and 21, 2022 and has since then been available to stream on PBS.org and the PBS video app.

== History and production ==
The miniseries was partially inspired by the United States Holocaust Memorial Museum's "Americans and the Holocaust" exhibition and Burns' production of it coincided with the ongoing exhibit. Work on the miniseries began in 2015, after Burns and Novick received questions about the American response to the Holocaust following the release of Burns’ documentaries The War and The Roosevelts: An Intimate History.

== Cast ==
- Liam Neeson as Polish Holocaust victim
- Matthew Rhys
- Paul Giamatti as Madison Grant
- Meryl Streep as Eleanor Roosevelt
- Werner Herzog as Hermann Göring
- Joe Morton
- Hope Davis
- Bradley Whitford as Thomas Wolfe / William Borah
- Helena Zengel
- Adam Arkin
- Elliott Gould
- Josh Lucas
- Murphy Guyer
- Carolyn McCormick
- Olivia Gilliatt as Anne Frank
- Paul Corning
- Leon Dische Becker

== Synopsis ==
Through interviews with Holocaust survivors, historians and witnesses, as well as through historical footage, the series examines the U.S. response to the rise of Adolf Hitler and the Holocaust.

The first episode starts in 1933 Frankfurt, and chronicles Anne Frank and her family's attempt to move to the United States. It then continues with an examination of the United States before World War II and the Holocaust, including antisemitism, anti-immigrant xenophobia, white supremacy, and how Nazi Germany looked to the segregated Jim Crow South as a model worthy of emulation.

As isolationism kept the U.S. out of the war for years, many Jews who sought to escape from Europe were excluded because of immigration quotas enshrined by the landmark Johnson-Reed Act of 1924, enforced by officials such as Breckenridge Long, and supported by public figures such as Father Charles Coughlin, Henry Ford and Charles Lindbergh.

The documentary challenges the myth that Americans didn’t know the extent of Hitler’s murderous vision. A radio dispatch by Edward R. Murrow, from December 1942, describes it in plain language: “Millions of human beings, most of them Jews, are being gathered up with ruthless efficiency and murdered.”

The miniseries ends with footage of recent events in the U.S., including the 2015 Charleston church shooting, the 2017 Unite the Right rally, the 2018 Pittsburgh synagogue shooting and the 2021 January 6 United States Capitol attack.

In an Op-Ed published shortly before the premiere of the documentary, the filmmakers underlined the parallels between the rise of Nazism and the situation in the United States in late 2022. "We are witnessing the rising appeal of authoritarianism abroad and at home, we are bombarded by social media outlets that spread divisive falsehoods and hatred, and, a mere two months before midterm elections, we find our democracy itself under attack." In conclusion, they urged viewers to think about the implications of history. "Do Americans today have the courage to look at the mistakes of our past for the sake of our improvement? Courage, in this case, includes our willingness to teach our entire history, to confront the difficult along with celebrating the positive."

== Episodes ==
No.	Title	Original release date	US viewers (millions)
1	"The Golden Door (Beginnings–1938)"	September 18, 2022	N/A
A xenophobic backlash prompts Congress to restrict immigration. Hitler and the Nazis persecute German Jews, forcing many of them to seek refuge. FDR is concerned about the growing crisis but is unable to coordinate a response to it. Runtime: 128 minutes
2	"Yearning to Breathe Free (1938–1942)"	September 20, 2022	N/A
As World War II begins, Americans are divided over whether to intervene against Nazi Germany or not. Some individuals and organizations work tirelessly to help refugees escape. Germany invades the USSR and secretly begins the mass murder of European Jews. Runtime: 137 minutes
3	"The Homeless, The Tempest-Tossed (1942–)"	September 21, 2022	N/A
A group of dedicated government officials fights against red tape in an attempt to support rescue operations. As the Allies liberate German camps, the public sees the sheer scale of the Holocaust and begins to reckon with its reverberations for the first time. Runtime: 130 minutes

The original airing of Episodes 2 and 3 was postponed for one day in honor of the funeral of Queen Elizabeth II on September 19.

== Release ==
The U.S. and the Holocaust was shown at the 2022 Telluride Film Festival, which Burns has frequently attended. To promote the film’s release, PBS held in-person and virtual roundtable discussions with film director Steven Spielberg, author Michael Abramowitz, CNN anchor Jake Tapper, the International Rescue Committee and Freedom House.

In the UK, The U.S. and the Holocaust was released on BBC Four weekly from January 9, 2023, with all episodes dropping on the BBC's iPlayer streaming service.

== Reception ==
The U.S. and the Holocaust was received positively by critics. As of October 2022, it has a 100% rating on film review aggregator Rotten Tomatoes. John Berman of CNN's New Day on September 15, 2022, called the series "breathtaking." Pulitzer Prize-winning journalist Dorothy Rabinowitz of Wall Street Journal wrote that the series was "sublime" and "shined a light on political aspects" of the Holocaust "never before addressed in a TV documentary," and "unforgettable." Matthew Gilbert of The Boston Globe wrote, "Compelling, and delivered by a series of articulate historians." Kelly Lawler of USA Today wrote, "Must-Watch."

It also was one of the programs awarded the prestigious Television Academy Honors in 2023 and the Alfred I. duPont-Columbia University Award in 2024.
