= Randolph E. Paul =

American lawyer

- Born: August 8, 1890; Hackensack, New Jersey, U.S.
- Died: February 6, 1956 (aged 65)
- Education: New York Law School; Amherst College

Randolph Evernghim Paul (1890–1956) was a name partner of the international law firm of Paul, Weiss, Rifkind, Wharton & Garrison and was a lawyer specializing in tax law. He is credited as "an architect of the modern tax system."

== Biography ==
Paul, the grandson of a butcher, was born in Hackensack, New Jersey on August 8, 1890, to Charles B. and Martha Evernghim Paul. He worked his way through Amherst College (Class of 1911), and received his law degree from New York Law School in 1913. He began his career as a switchboard operator and, later, as an insurance adjuster.

== Law career ==
=== Early law career ===
In 1918, Paul happened upon an advertisement placed by one George E. Holmes soliciting assistance in Holmes' specialty practice in federal income tax law, a still novel concentration in the years just following adoption of the Sixteenth Amendment to the United States Constitution. Though lacking any background in the field, Paul answered the ad, got the job, and within two years had become a name partner in the firm.

Over the next twenty years, the firm's name underwent various changes: first Holmes, Paul and Havens; then Holmes, Lynn, Paul and Havens; then Olcott, Holmes, Glass, Paul and Havens; and finally Olcott, Paul and Havens. In 1938, Paul left his small firm to form the tax law department at one of New York's oldest and then-largest firms, Lord, Day & Lord. By this time, Paul was a pioneer in establishing tax law as an integral component of a full-service Wall Street law firm. He was the author of the leading treatise on tax law in the United States (the six-volume Law of Federal Taxation with Jacob Mertens, and successive editions of Studies in Federal Taxation), and a visiting Sterling Professor of Law at Yale Law School.

=== Civil service ===
In 1940, he was named a director of the Federal Reserve Bank of New York, the first tax lawyer ever to occupy the position. Throughout the 1930s, Paul served as a part-time advisor to U.S. Secretary of Treasury Henry Morgenthau Jr. Five days after the Japanese attack on Pearl Harbor, Paul finally accepted previously-declined entreaties to work full-time for the U.S. Treasury Department. First as special assistant to the Secretary for the Tax Division, and later as the Department's General Counsel, Acting Secretary of the Treasury for Foreign Funds Control, and the Roosevelt Administration's chief spokesperson on tax matters on Capitol Hill, Paul convinced Morgenthau to embrace Keynesian principles and to consider taxation as a vehicle for social progress.

To this end, Paul was instrumental in defeating attempts to enact a national sales tax and in transforming the federal income tax into the broad-based revenue source and tool of fiscal policy that exists today. The Government's existing income tax system—in which taxpayers need not pay their tax bill for one year until the next, when the value of the dollar had fallen—exacerbated the problem. The confluence of these events required an exceptional solution, which the Paul-written Revenue Act of 1942 addressed. Paul is credited with modernizing the Internal Revenue Code and persuading Congress to enact the payroll withholding tax.

=== Paul's role in the creation of the War Refugee Board ===
Paul was also the principal sponsor of the first contemporaneous Government paper attacking America's dormant complicity in The Holocaust. Entitled "Report to the Secretary on the Acquiescence of This Government in the Murder of the Jews", written by Josiah DuBois, the document was an indictment of the U.S. State Department's diplomatic, military, and immigration policies. Among other things, the Report narrated the State Department's inaction and in some instances active opposition to the release of funds for the rescue of Jews in Romania and occupied France, and condemned immigration policies that closed American doors to Jewish refugees from countries then engaged in their systematic slaughter.

The catalyst for the Report was an incident involving 70,000 Jews whose evacuation from Romania could have been procured with a $170,000 bribe. The Foreign Funds Control unit of the Treasury, which was within Paul's jurisdiction, authorized the payment of the funds, the release of which both the President and Secretary of State Cordell Hull supported. From mid-July 1943, when the proposal was made and Treasury approved, through December 1943, a combination of the State Department's bureaucracy and the British Ministry of Economic Warfare interposed various obstacles. The Report was the product of frustration over that event. On January 16, 1944, Morgenthau and Paul personally delivered the paper to President Roosevelt, warning him that Congress would act if he did not. The result was Executive Order 9417 creating the War Refugee Board composed of the Secretaries of State, Treasury and War. Issued on January 22, 1944, the Executive Order declared that "it is the policy of this Government to take all measures within its power to rescue the victims of enemy oppression who are in imminent danger of death and otherwise to afford such victims all possible relief and assistance consistent with the successful prosecution of the war."

=== Paul's Role in Post-WWII Negotiations with the Swiss ===
President Truman appointed Randolph Paul chief negotiator with the Swiss concerning Nazi assets under Swiss control. In spring 1946 Paul requested permission to threaten Switzerland with economic sanctions as a means of pressuring it to turn over Nazi assets that remained under Swiss control. Permission was refused and Paul was instructed to accept Switzerland's offer, which was based on Switzerland's much lower estimate of the amount of Nazi loot in Switzerland.

=== Return to private practice ===
Paul left the Treasury Department in March 1944, having served as general counsel since 1942, to rejoin Lord, Day & Lord. Eighteen months later, he accepted an invitation to join a law firm then known as Cohen, Cole, Weiss & Wharton and which became, with the addition of Paul and Lloyd K. Garrison, the firm of Paul, Weiss, Wharton & Garrison. Based on his reputation gained in the Treasury Department, Paul attracted such blue-chip clients as Ford, General Motors, Standard Oil of California, Brown Shoe Company, B.V.D. Company, Reader's Digest, Union Sulpher Company, and the estates of the rich and famous. In addition to his private practice, Paul continued writing, including Taxation for Prosperity (1947), a studied argument for postwar maintenance of a progressive income tax; The History of Taxation in the United States (1953); and dozens of articles for journals such as The Harvard Law Review, The Yale Law Journal, The Tax Law Review and The Tax Lawyer.

Paul maintained a teaching schedule as an adjunct professor at Harvard and Howard University Law Schools, among others. He briefly returned to government service as a part-time Special Assistant to President Truman for tax policy and later as the President's envoy to the negotiations between Switzerland and the Allied Powers on Nazi assets in Switzerland – a controversy that stayed alive for a half century after his death. He was a frequent witness before congressional committees on tax and fiscal policy, testifying on the proper role of taxation in the Nation's social and fiscal programs.

== Death ==
On February 6, 1956, Paul was testifying before a Joint Committee of the U.S. Congress on President Eisenhower's Economic Report. Having completed his prepared text, Paul began to answer a question when he slumped forward, dead of a heart attack.
