= Report to the Secretary on the Acquiescence of This Government in the Murder of the Jews =

Report on US government actions during the Holocaust

Report to the Secretary on the Acquiescence of This Government in the Murder of the Jews was the initial title of a government memorandum prepared by officials of the United States Department of the Treasury. Dated January 13, 1944, during the Holocaust, its primary author was Josiah E. DuBois Jr., Assistant to the Secretary of the Treasury. Focusing on the period from late 1942 to late 1943, the report argued that certain officials within the US State Department not only had failed to use US government tools to rescue Jewish European refugees but instead had used them to prevent or obstruct rescue attempts, as well as preventing relevant information from being made available to the American public. Described as "political dynamite", the memorandum, shortened and re-titled Personal Report to the President, helped convince President Franklin D. Roosevelt to approve the creation of the War Refugee Board.

== Background ==
In 1938, U.S. President Franklin D. Roosevelt called for an international conference on the plight of Jewish European refugees. Held in Évian-les-Bains, France and known as the Évian Conference, no substantive change resulted. The German Foreign Office, in a sardonic reply, found it "astonishing" that other countries would decry Germany's treatment of Jews and then decline to admit them.

During World War II, in the early 1940s, information about The Holocaust started to become public but was dismissed by many as exaggerated. As time passed, it became an increasingly contentious matter in contemporary American politics. At the same time, a public fear was generated concerning the war-time security risk posed by admitting refugees to the United States. The U.S. State Department's Visa Division was responsible for issuing travel visas to foreign nationals seeking to get to the United States. That division was under the control of Breckinridge Long, a State Department officer who had expressed admiration for both Mussolini's fascist regime and for Hitler.

Henry Morgenthau Jr., was the Secretary of the Treasury during the Roosevelt administration. By 1943, the State Department publicly confirmed reports of some details of the Nazi plan to annihilate Jews, and Morgenthau discussed this with his staff. Officials at the Treasury Department were disappointed that the 1943 bi-national Bermuda Conference on refugees did not deliver results and suspected that the State Department had delayed financing for the rescue of refugees.

== The Report ==
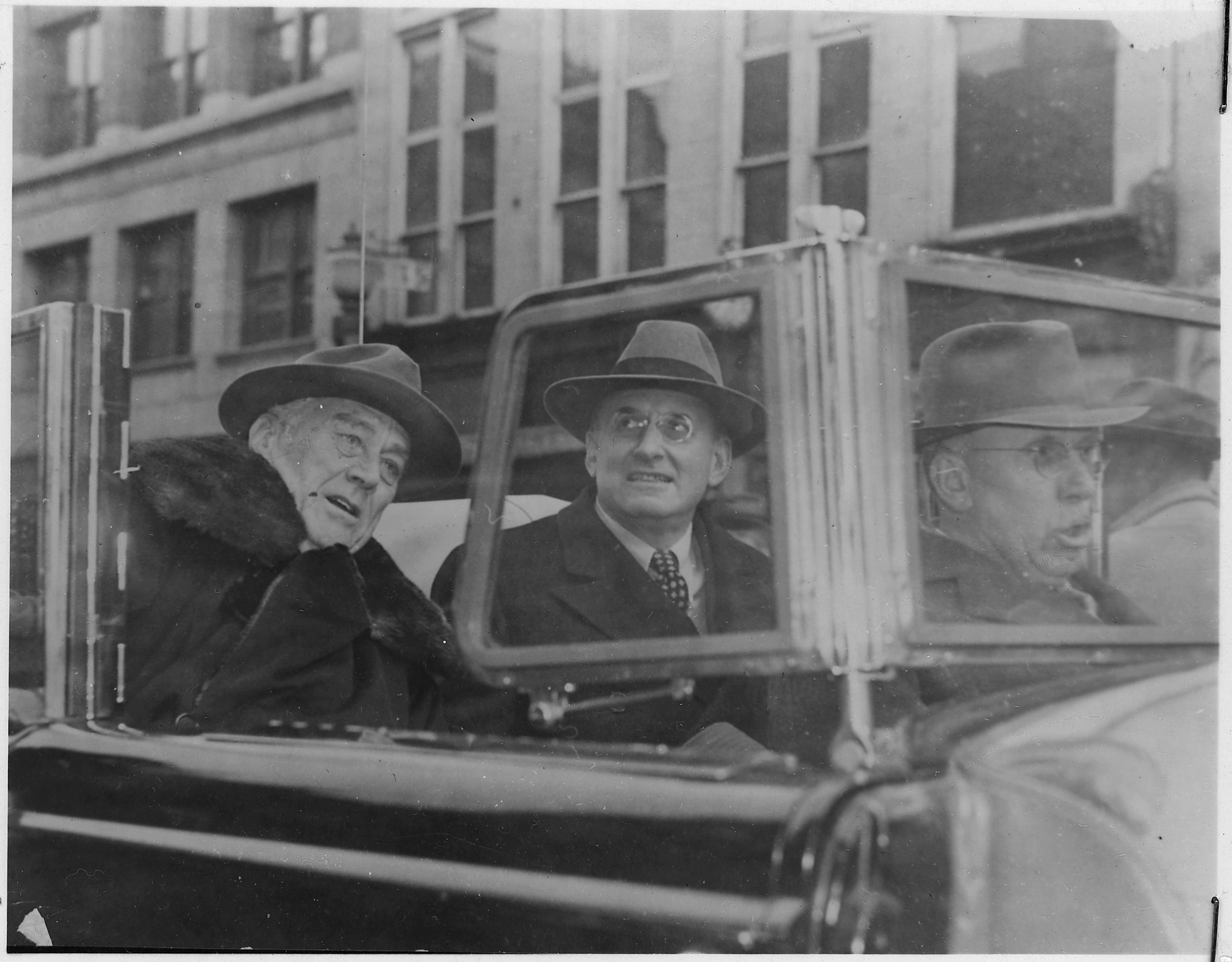
Franklin D. Roosevelt and Henry Morgenthau Jr. in Poughkeepsie, New York, November 6, 1944

The report has been described as a 17 or 18 pages-long memorandum. Dated January 13, 1944, the report was initiated by Treasury general counsel, Randolph Paul, authored by the Secretary's assistant Josiah E. DuBois Jr. with help from the director of foreign funds control, John Pehle, and addressed to U.S. Secretary of the Treasury Henry Morgenthau Jr. The Treasury officials criticized the US State Department for its alleged obstructionism and even conspiracies, and stated that, "[u]nless remedial steps of a drastic nature are taken, and taken immediately, I am certain that no effective action will be taken by this government to prevent the complete extermination of the Jews in German controlled Europe, and that this Government will have to share for all time responsibility for this extermination". DuBois argued that certain officials within the State Department not only had failed to use US government tools to rescue the Jews, but had used them instead to prevent or obstruct rescue attempts, as well as preventing relevant information from being made available to the American public, and made further attempts to cover up such obstructionist activities.

Dubois' report was written in the first person and focused on the time period between late 1942, and late 1943. According to the report, in late 1942, largely through the efforts of Under Secretary of State Sumner Welles, the United States publicly confirmed the Nazi program and led its allies in a December 1942 public condemnation and promise of help. (At the time, the allies were known as the United Nations). In January 1943, Welles cabled the American delegation in Switzerland for more information to be made public. In February persons unknown sent a cable from State basically ordering the diplomats in Switzerland not to make such information public. In April, the Bermuda Conference between State Department staff and British Foreign Office staff met specifically to discuss refugee issues but the results of the conference were kept secret. (As it turned out, neither the British nor Americans expressed much interest in taking concrete action on refugees.) In the first half of 1943, several cables from State discussed a plan to fund refugee rescue. In July, State finally approached Treasury about these refugee funds and Treasury approved but State continued to delay the funding. In addition, the report covered State's delays and failures in even filling refugee immigration quotas, ostensibly claiming security concerns. The report contains extended criticism, in particular of Assistant Secretary of State Breckinridge Long for delay and cover-up, and stressed that more than a year had gone by and nothing had been done, although people were dying and time was of the essence.

The title of Dubois' document was later described as vehement, even fantastic, though "borne out by the grotesque revelations". The report given to the president by Morgenthau had a less "jarring", more technical title: "Personal Report to the President". The report was nonetheless still described as "scathing" and as "political dynamite", given the context of the election year 1944. Within days of its receipt, Roosevelt approved the creation of a War Refugee Board, a U.S. executive agency to aid civilian victims of the Nazi and Axis powers. Although John Pehle, its first director, called the Board "little and late," the number of lives saved by the War Refugee Board has been generally counted in the tens of thousands, and may have been as high as 200,000.

== See also ==
- International response to the Holocaust
- MS St. Louis
- The Abandonment of the Jews
