= War Refugee Board =

United States executive agency

The War Refugee Board, established by President Franklin D. Roosevelt in January 1944, was a U.S. executive agency to aid civilian victims of the Axis powers. The Board was, in the words of historian Rebecca Erbelding, "the only time in American history that the US government founded a non-military government agency to save the lives of civilians being murdered by a wartime enemy."

There was increasing and persistent significant publicity and pressure on the Roosevelt administration to help the abandoned Jews of Europe. The campaign was led by the Bergson Group led by Hillel Kook (aka Peter Bergson). The activist group had significant support by many leading senators and congressmen mostly from states without significant Jewish voters, from Eleanor Roosevelt, famous Hollywood and Broadway personalities and other prominent citizens. President Roosevelt acted after considerable additional pressure from his friend, Secretary of the Treasury Henry Morgenthau Jr. and his team at the Treasury. Roosevelt "stressed that it was urgent that action be taken at once to forestall the plan of the Nazis to exterminate all the Jews and other persecuted minorities in Europe".

The WRB was created when a group of young Treasury Department lawyers, including John Pehle, Ansel Luxford, and Josiah E. DuBois Jr., grew frustrated by State Department delays surrounding a license for relief funds to help Jews escape Romania and France. While the Treasury Department had granted the World Jewish Congress permission to send the money to Switzerland in July 1943, the State Department used various excuses, delaying permission until December, a full eight months after the program was first proposed. Josiah DuBois also found evidence that the State Department had actively tried to suppress information about the murder of the Jews from reaching the United States.

When the Treasury staff learned of the State Department obstructions, they submitted a Report to the Secretary on the Acquiescence of this Government in the Murder of the Jews, first drafted by DuBois, aiming to convince Morgenthau to meet with the President. Morgenthau, John Pehle, and Randolph Paul met with Roosevelt on January 16, 1944, where he agreed to create the War Refugee Board, issuing Executive Order 9417. Credited with rescuing tens of thousands of Jews from Nazi-occupied countries, through the efforts of Raoul Wallenberg and others, the War Refugee Board is the only major civilian effort undertaken by the United States government to save the lives of Jews during the Holocaust.

== Creation ==
The immediate cause for Roosevelt's action was pressure from the staff of the Treasury Department's office of Foreign Funds Control and its chief, John W. Pehle. Pehle's office had authorized a number of charitable groups to use funds in the U.S. regulated under the Trading with the Enemy Act to pay for food, medicine, and other aid to refugees and other civilian victims of the war in Europe. Those efforts were systematically blocked by some officials in the U.S. State Department. Specifically, in July 1943, the Treasury Department issued a license to the World Jewish Congress to use funds in the United States to pay some of the costs of evacuating Jews from Romania and France. (This should not be confused with another initiative, by the Romanian government, to "sell" Jews for approximately $50 a head, with which it had no connection.)

Various State Department officials delayed the license for the next five months. Treasury officials, led by a staff lawyer, Josiah E. DuBois Jr., investigated how and why the license had been held up. In their research, which was aided by some whistleblowers in the State Department, they discovered that in addition to blocking licenses for use of money to aid refugees, the State Department had also sent foreign missions orders not to forward information about Nazi atrocities—specifically about the Holocaust—to Washington. At the end of 1943, DuBois wrote a memorandum, "Report to the Secretary on the Acquiescence of This Government in the Murder of the Jews", which said the State Department was "guilty not only of gross procrastination and willful failure to act, but even of willful attempts to prevent action from being taken to rescue Jews from Hitler".

DuBois took his memorandum to Treasury General Counsel Randolph E. Paul, who agreed to put his signature on it and forward it to Secretary Henry Morgenthau Jr. After a series of meetings, Morgenthau agreed to take his staff's concerns to the President. Morgenthau, Paul, and Pehle met with President Roosevelt in the White House on Sunday, January 16, 1944.

Roosevelt got an oral briefing on the facts and conclusions in the Treasury Department's memorandum, and immediately agreed to deal with the issues by creating a War Refugee Board, consisting of three cabinet members, Secretary of State Cordell Hull, Secretary Morgenthau, and Secretary of War Henry Stimson (Morgenthau had suggested that instead of Stimson, Leo Crowley, Director of the Foreign Economic Administration be appointed, but Roosevelt decided to appoint Stimson instead.) On January 22, 1944, Roosevelt signed Executive Order 9417 creating the Board. The Treasury Department did not act in a vacuum.

By the end of 1943, Roosevelt was also getting intense pressure to act on the issue from some members of Congress and Hillel Kook (aka Peter Bergson) and the Emergency Committee to Save the Jews of Europe, which he founded and led. Notably Jewish Congressman Sol Bloom, head of the Foreign Relations Committee, opposed the initiative and especially Hillel Kook and his rescue activist group. Progressive Jewish organizations under leadership of Stephen Wise, director of the World Jewish Congress, opposed the initiative at the Sol Blum organized fall 1943 Congressional hearings where he voiced his policy: to save the Jews of Europe by opening the gates of Palestine, which doomed Jews to annihilation. Two Congressional resolutions had been introduced in November 1943, calling on Roosevelt to create a commission to formulate and effectuate plans for the relief and rescue of Jews. The Senate was scheduled to vote on the resolution in late January; the House Committee on Foreign Affairs held hearings, and testimony from these hearings further discredited Breckinridge Long of the State Department.

Establishment of the Board was thanks to the team at the Treasury Department and an information campaign and pressure by Kook's high-level rescue activist group.

== Composition ==
John W. Pehle, the assistant to the secretary of treasury, was appointed executive director of the board, which was directly responsible to the president. Its members included the Secretary of State, the Secretary of the Treasury, the Secretary of War, and a staff, mainly pulled from inside the Treasury Department. Though they were officially restricted to a maximum staff of thirty, some government employees (including Pehle) were considered "detailed" to the WRB, raising their staff to seventy in the summer of 1944. Brigadier General William O'Dwyer later succeeded Pehle as executive director until its dissolution at the end of World War II.

The Board appointed representatives in Turkey, Switzerland, Sweden, Portugal, Great Britain, Italy, and North Africa.

== Activity ==
The WRB developed and implemented various plans and programs for:

- Rescuing, transporting, and relieving victims of enemy oppression
- Establishing of havens of temporary refuge for such victims

The War Refugee Board enlisted the cooperation of foreign governments and international refugee and rescue organizations in carrying out these functions. Such neutral countries as Switzerland, Sweden, and Turkey were of particular importance, serving as bases of operation for the rescue and relief program. The Vatican may have rendered some assistance, mostly towards the very end of the war. Well before establishment of the WRB some Papal representatives helped and tried to protect Jews, for example Angelo Rotta in Budapest and Phillippe Bernardini in Switzerland, both deans of the diplomatic community. They helped in part as a channels of communication.

The board obtained the cooperation of the Intergovernmental Committee on Refugees, the United Nations Relief and Rehabilitation Administration, and the International Committee of the Red Cross in rehabilitating and resettling refugees, finding temporary shelters for rescued victims, transporting these victims to the shelters and providing for their maintenance in transit, and making relief deliveries inside enemy territory.

The WRB worked closely with private U.S. relief agencies in formulating, financing, and executing plans and projects. A Treasury Department licensing policy that permitted established private agencies to transfer funds from the United States to their representatives in neutral countries aided in financing the rescue of persecuted peoples living under Nazi control. Under this licensing policy, it was possible to communicate with persons in enemy territory and to finance rescue operations with certain controls designed to bring no financial benefit to the enemy. Approximately $15 million in private funds was made available in this way. The board obtained blockade clearances for food shipments of private relief agencies for distribution by the International Red Cross to detainees in Nazi concentration camps and supplemented these private projects with a food-parcel program of its own financed from the emergency funds of the president.

Through the efforts of the War Refugee Board, refugee camps were prepared in North Africa and safe haven was arranged in Palestine, Switzerland, and Sweden.

In August 1944 the WRB brought 982 Jewish refugees, who were in Italy from many countries, to The Fort Ontario Emergency Refugee Shelter in Oswego, in New York. These refugees were admitted outside the immigration quota laws, but given no status, and it was intended that they would be repatriated to their home countries at a (successful) war's end.

The WRB used the example of Fort Ontario to influence other countries to also allow additional refugees over their borders.

The WRB lobbied Roosevelt to publicly condemn the mass murder of Jews by the Nazis, which he did on March 24, 1944.

After George Mantello, First Secretary of El Salvador in Switzerland received the Auschwitz Protocol with much delay he immediately publicized its summary. From about June 24, 1944 in Switzerland that led to large-scale grassroots protests, Sunday masses and about 400 articles in the papers about the barbarism against Europe's Jews. This created so much noise that it attracted international attention to the large-scale daily deportation of Hungary's Jews to Auschwitz since May 1944. The WRB may have also helped put pressure on Hungary's Regent Horthy Miklos, which may have contributed to the cessation of most deportations of Jews from Hungary to Auschwitz on July 6, 1944. That saved many of the Jews of Hungary.

The Board convinced Swedish noble turned diplomat for the rescue mission Raoul Wallenberg to go to Budapest and protect Jews. Through the WRB, the American Jewish Joint Distribution Committee (the Joint,) funded Wallenberg's rescue work there. The work by Wallenberg in Hungary was one of the most successful and important rescue efforts by the War Refugee Board. He may have protected tens of thousands of Jews.

It is difficult to determine the exact number of Jews rescued by the War Refugee Board, since so much of their work was done behind enemy lines and involved psychological warfare and other intangible rescue activities. One historian, David Wyman, credits them with saving as many as 200,000 people; the WRB staff themselves estimated they saved tens of thousands. However, near the end of his life, WRB director Pehle described the work as "too little, too late" in contrast with the totality of the Holocaust.

With the close of the war in Europe, the work of the board was at an end. By the terms of Executive Order No. 9614 the board was abolished on September 15, 1945.

== See also ==
- Auschwitz bombing debate
