= Josiah E. DuBois Jr. =

American attorney (1912–1983)

Josiah DuBois Jr.
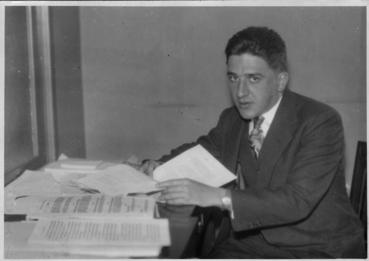
- DuBois, c. 1945
- Born: October 21, 1912; Camden, New Jersey
- Died: August 1, 1983 (aged 70); Woodbury, New Jersey
- Occupation: Attorney
- Known for: Prosecutor at Nuremberg; War Refugee Board
- Notable work: Report to the Secretary; The Devil's Chemists

Josiah Ellis DuBois Jr. (October 21, 1912 – August 1, 1983) was an American attorney at the U.S. Treasury Department who played a major role in exposing State Department obstruction efforts to provide American visas to Jews trying to escape Nazi Europe. In 1944, he wrote the Report to the Secretary on the Acquiescence of This Government in the Murder of the Jews, which led to the creation of the War Refugee Board. After the war, he was a prosecutor at the Nuremberg Trials prosecuting Nazi war crimes, particularly in the prosecution of Holocaust chemical manufacturer IG Farben.

== Background ==
DuBois was born in Camden and raised in Woodbury, New Jersey, the eldest of at least eight children born to Josiah DuBois Sr. and Amelia Ayles DuBois. In 1934, he graduated from the University of Pennsylvania Law School.

== Career ==
Dubois served as special assistant to the Secretary of the Treasury, 1944–45; general counsel of the War Refugee Board, 1944; member of the Allied Reparations Commission, Moscow, 1945; member of the U.S. delegation to the Potsdam Conference, 1945; and deputy chief counsel for War Crimes in charge of the I.G. Farben case, Nuremberg, Germany, 1947-48

=== Report on US acquiescence in Holocaust ===
DuBois wrote the famous Report to the Secretary on the Acquiescence of This Government in the Murder of the Jews, which Treasury Secretary Henry Morgenthau Jr. used to convince President Franklin Roosevelt to establish the War Refugee Board in 1944. Randolph Paul was also a principal sponsor of this report, the first contemporaneous Government paper attacking America's policies during The Holocaust.

This document was an indictment of the U.S. State Department’s diplomatic, military, and immigration policies. Among other things, the Report narrated the State Department’s inaction and in some instances active opposition to the release of funds for the rescue of Jews in Romania and German-occupied France during World War II, and condemned immigration policies that closed American doors to Jewish refugees from countries then engaged in their systematic slaughter.

By late 1942, credible reports of systematized mass murder were reaching the U.S. DuBois, Paul and other junior officers in the Treasury Department were dismayed at the obstructionism by the U.S. government, in particular the high-ranking officers of the State Department, blocking efforts to rescue Jews - particularly the indifference of Assistant Secretary of State Breckenridge Long, whom DeBois described, simply, as "an anti-Semite."

DuBois and his colleagues began to probe the State Department's tactics for blocking what they saw as the most urgent humanitarian mission of their time. Author and presidential aide Richard Goodwin recalled:

As Joe dug deeper, he started making enemies. he told me of State Department officials who would say to him things like, "You Jews are a pain in the ass," because they assumed he was Jewish, which of course he was not.... Joe told me that on one occasion a State Department official pulled him aside and said, "DuBois, you're heading for a lot of trouble, more than you can handle. You better drop this whole issue." If they thought that would scare him off, they didn't know Joe DuBois. Not only was he not intimidated, he saw it as an indication that he was on the right track. it convinced him that there must be even more skeletons in the closet, and it energized him to work even harder.

The final catalyst for the Report was an incident involving 70,000 Jews whose evacuation from Romania could have been procured with a $170,000 bribe. The Foreign Funds Control unit of the Treasury, which was within Paul’s jurisdiction, authorized the payment of the funds, the release of which both the President and Secretary of State Cordell Hull supported. From mid-July 1943, when the proposal was made and Treasury approved, through December 1943, a combination of the State Department’s bureaucracy and the British Ministry of Economic Warfare interposed various obstacles. The Report was the product of frustration over that event.

On January 16, 1944, Morgenthau and Paul personally delivered the paper to President Roosevelt. Its original, inflammatory title had been softened to a more simple, "Personal Report to the President." Other sections were softened as well. An early draft of the "Personal Report" concluded, "This much is clear to me.... Unless remedial steps of a drastic nature are taken, and taken immediately, no effective action will be taken by this government to prevent the extermination of the Jews in German-controlled Europe, and this government will have to share for all time responsibility for this extermination." The last sentence was changed to focus on the danger this issue posed to Roosevelt's reputation: "This matter is too big to be covered up for long, and unless you take immediate steps to get to the root of the trouble, the whole story may explode to the discredit of this administration." The result of that briefing, and Morgenthau's arguments to Roosevelt, was Executive Order 9417 creating the War Refugee Board composed of the Secretaries of State, Treasury and War. Issued on January 22, 1944, the Executive Order declared that "it is the policy of this Government to take all measures within its power to rescue the victims of enemy oppression who are in imminent danger of death and otherwise to afford such victims all possible relief and assistance consistent with the successful prosecution of the war."

=== Nuremberg Military Trials ===
DuBois was put in charge of the IG Farben trial at the Nuremberg Military Trials (1946-1949). Of the 24 defendants, 13 were found guilty of at least one charge, and given sentences ranging from 1 1/2 to 8 years. Later, he wrote the seminal account of that trial, The Devil's Chemists.

=== Accusations of Communism ===
On July 9, 1947, US Representative George Anthony Dondero included Dubois when publicly questioning the "fitness" of United States Secretary of War Robert P. Patterson for failing to ferret out Communist infiltrators in his department. Dondero, who sympathized with McCarthyism, had previously tried to defund the prosecution of the IG Farben executives at the Nuremberg trials. Dondero, who also claimed that modern art fostered Communism, decried what he said was Patterson's lack of ability to "fathom the wiles of the international Communist conspiracy." Dondero cited ten government personnel in the War Department who had Communist backgrounds or leanings:

- Colonel Bernard Bernstein
- Russel A. Nixon
- Abraham L. Pomerantz
- Josiah E. DuBois Jr.
- Richard Sasuly
- George Shaw Wheeler
- Heinz Norden
- Max Lowenthal
- Allen Rosenberg (member of Lowenthal's staff)

Dondero stated, "It is with considerable regret that I am forced to the conclusion the Secretary Patterson falls short of these standards."

== Works ==
=== Books ===
- Generals in Grey Suits: The Directors of the International 'I. G. Farben' Cartel, Their Conspiracy and Trial at Nuremberg. London: Bodley Head. 1953.
- The Devil's Chemists (PDF). Boston, MA: Beacon Press. 1952. Archived from the original (PDF) on 2012-06-17.

=== Memos ===
- Report to the Secretary on the Acquiescence of This Government in the Murder of the Jews (Jan. 3, 1944)

== See also ==
- International response to the Holocaust
