= Rublee =

Rublee is a surname. Notable people with this surname include:

- George Rublee (1868-1957), American lawyer
- Horace Rublee (1829–1896), American journalist and Ambassador
- Juliet Barrett Rublee (1875-1966), American birth control advocate
- William Alvah Rublee Ambassador and journalist
