= Jewish refugees from Nazism =

Emigration of Jews

Jewish refugees from Nazism are Jews who were forced to leave their place of residence due to persecution by the Nazis, their allies (the Axis powers) and Nazi collaborators between 1933 and 1945.

Starting in the 1930s, right-wing regimes with anti-Semitic policies came to power in Germany and some other European countries. This led to the flight of hundreds of thousands of Jewish refugees. Between 350,000 and 400,000 Jews left Germany, Austria, and Czechoslovakia before the start of World War II. Of the 235,000 Jewish immigrants to Palestine from 1932 to 1939, approximately 60,000 were German Jews.

During World War II, millions of Jews were forced to evacuate areas occupied by the German army and its allies, and most of those who remained were forcibly moved to ghettos and then either killed on the spot or deported to extermination camps.

Many countries, fearing the influx of refugees, created obstacles and did not grant them entry permits. Even news of the mass murder of Jews by the Nazis did not become a reason to reconsider this policy. After the war, the rise of anti-Semitism in Europe and the desire of the surviving victims of the genocide to go to Palestine caused a conflict with the anti-immigration policy of the British Mandate authorities. In the 1950s and later, questions of material compensation for victims of persecution were addressed.

== 1933–1939 ==
The idea of expelling Jews from Germany was one of the most important programmatic points of the National Socialists. At the time the Nazis came to power, 523,000 Jews lived in Germany, making up less than 1% of the population. At the first stage, populist measures (boycotts, insults, etc.), discriminatory legislation, and economic sanctions were used as anti-Jewish policies. Subsequently, violent pressure was applied to force Jews to emigrate, as well as direct deportations. The expulsion of Jews was accompanied by their almost total robbery during emigration. The Nazi policy of confiscating property intensified from 25% in 1933 to almost 90% by 1938.

=== Anti-Jewish legislation 1933–1937 ===
The mass persecution of Jews in Germany began on April 1, 1933, when the first nationwide boycott of all Jewish businesses in the country was carried out. The main instrument of anti-Jewish policy in 1933–1935 was anti-Jewish legislation.

On April 7, 1933, the Law for the Restoration of the Professional Civil Service was adopted, which ordered the dismissal of all non- Aryan officials, with rare exceptions. Anyone who had at least one Jewish ancestor was considered a non-Aryan. Then, from April to December, several regulations and measures were adopted aimed against the Jewish intelligentsia with the goal of eliminating the influence of Jews on public life. Thus, on April 25, quotas were introduced for the admission of Jews to educational institutions, and on May 10, a public burning of books by Jewish and anti-Nazi authors took place. Racial restrictions affected doctors, lawyers, notaries, professors, editors and others. A stream of anti-Semitic publications appeared in the press, especially in the weekly Der Stürmer edited by Julius Streicher. The result of this policy was the flight of 60,000 Jews from Germany in 1933–1934, of which 53,000 ended up in France, Belgium and Holland.

The pinnacle of anti-Jewish legislation was the so-called Nuremberg Race Laws adopted on September 15, 1935. Jews were deprived of German citizenship; mixed marriages were prohibited. Subsequently, amendments were adopted to the laws, and all other racist legal norms were drawn up as an addition to these laws. At the economic level, a policy of Aryanization was carried out - the transfer of property into the hands of people of German origin. At this stage, Aryanization was not associated with the forced seizure of property, but direct and indirect pressure was exerted on Jews to sell their property.

From 1933 to 1937, 130,000 Jews emigrated from Germany.

=== International reaction ===
In October 1933, the League of Nations Assembly created a special office for Jewish refugees from Germany, the High Commissioner for Refugees Arriving from Germany. Its head was the American professor and journalist James Grover McDonald. He began to fight for the unification of efforts to finance aid, since the League of Nations did not directly finance this work, and against restrictions on the immigration of refugees. In two years of work, he helped to settle 80 thousand Jewish refugees in Palestine. MacDonald tried to convince the League of Nations to intervene directly, but these attempts were unsuccessful. On December 27, 1935, MacDonald resigned in protest. In an open letter on this matter, he noted:

When the internal policy of a state threatens people with a complete trampling of their human dignity, considerations of diplomatic correctness must give way to considerations of elementary humanity. I would be remiss if I did not draw attention to the current situation and appeal to the world public, through the League of Nations… to take steps to prevent this real tragedy, as well as others that already threaten humanity.

In 1936, the "British Committee for Aid to German Jews" was created. It developed active lobbying activities in Great Britain.

=== Forced emigration 1938–1939 ===
The year 1938 was a turning point in the attitude towards Jews in Germany. After the dismissal of the pragmatist Hjalmar Schacht as Minister of Economics at the end of 1937, the influence of the radical Nazis, in particular Hermann Göring, increased. Historian Dan Michman notes a direct connection between the accelerated preparations for war and the tightening of anti-Jewish policies. Beginning in 1938, this policy was intensified with the aim of achieving the emigration of Jews from German territory. It included means of psychological pressure in the form of further discrimination and separation of Jews and non-Jews, economic discrimination and police pressure.

Several measures were carried out throughout Germany, the purpose of which was to pit Jews against non-Jews, such as the separation of postal items and forced name changes. From June 1938, after the mandatory registration of "Jewish property", forced "Aryanization" began. Dan Michman writes that police pressure actions to force Jews to emigrate were carried out by both the SS and the police system as a whole and were distinguished by particular cruelty. Professor Marion Kaplan notes that Jews were literally robbed bare during their emigration, even to the point of having their gold teeth removed.

According to Michman, the apogee of forced emigration was the so-called Polish Action at the end of October 1938, when 17,000 German Jews with Polish passports were arrested and forcibly deported across the Polish border.

=== Anschluss of Austria and the establishment of the Central Bureau for Jewish Emigration ===
The annexation of Austria was part of the official foreign policy of the Nazis from 1933. On March 12, 1938, German troops entered the country, and on March 13, the Law on the Reunification of Austria with the German Empire was published, according to which Austria was declared one of the states of the German Empire under the name Ostmark. At the time of annexation to Germany, the Jewish population of Austria was 181,778 people, of whom 165,946 (91.3%) lived in Vienna. After the Nuremberg Laws were implemented in Austria, 220,000 people were considered Jews in Austria. After the Anschluss, which was accompanied by spontaneous pogroms, Jews became the object of organized persecution. This prompted many Austrian Jews to flee the country, mainly to Italy and Switzerland. From March 26 and throughout April, Jews were forcibly expelled from entire regions of the country - to the Czech Republic, Hungary and Yugoslavia.

The Anschluss was an important stage in Heinrich Himmler's activities - in the part that concerned anti-Jewish policy. A forced reorganization of Jewish communities was carried out, this process was led by Adolf Eichmann. In August 1938, Eichmann founded the Central Agency for Jewish Emigration in Vienna to speed up the emigration process. In November 1938, Hermann Göring created a similar institution in Berlin. In 1939, Adolf Eichmann founded a similar bureau in Prague.

Before the war, 100 thousand Jews left Austria.

=== The Evian Conference ===
From July 5 to 16, 1938, at the initiative of US president Franklin D. Roosevelt, the Evian Conference was convened to address the problem of refugees from Germany and Austria, with representatives from 32 countries taking part. Not a single international organization involved in refugee assistance was represented, except for the commissioner general of the League of Nations. Representatives of the refugees themselves and Jewish organizations were not allowed to attend the conference. Of the conference participants, only the Dominican Republic expressed a desire to accept refugees and provide them with land for this purpose. European countries, the United States and Australia stated that they were unable to expand the quotas. Great Britain categorically refused to accept refugees either in the metropolis or in Palestine, offering to accept a small number of people in East Africa.

The result of the Evian Conference was the creation of the Intergovernmental Committee on Refugee Affairs, which operated until April 1943. Australia agreed to accept 15,000 refugees over three years, and Latin American countries were also ready to accept them in small numbers. Thanks to the work of the Intergovernmental Committee, an international agreement was concluded to allow refugees in transit to cross borders without passports. Negotiations with Germany on organized emigration and on allowing refugees to take some of their property with them were fruitless due to the Nazi position. Overall, the Evian Conference did not solve the refugee problem.

For the Jews of the Third Reich, according to the famous statement of Chaim Weizmann (later the first president of Israel), "The world was divided into two camps: countries that did not want Jews, and countries that did not want them in their countries."

Meanwhile, the situation for Jews continued to deteriorate and the flow of refugees continued to grow, especially after the Kristallnacht pogroms of November 9–10, 1938.

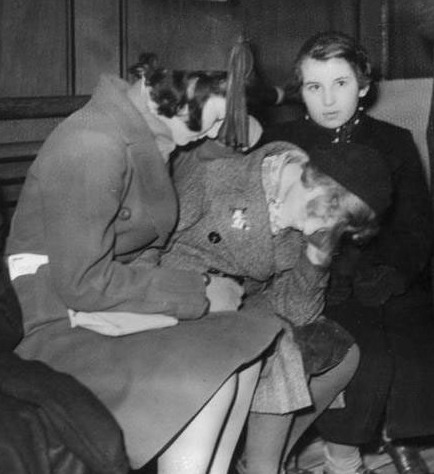
Teenage refugees in Essex, UK, 2 December 1938

In December 1938, Britain allowed 10,000 Jewish children to enter the country without their parents, the so-called Kindertransport program. The program was interrupted with the outbreak of World War II in September 1939.

=== Rublee-Wohlthat-Plan ===
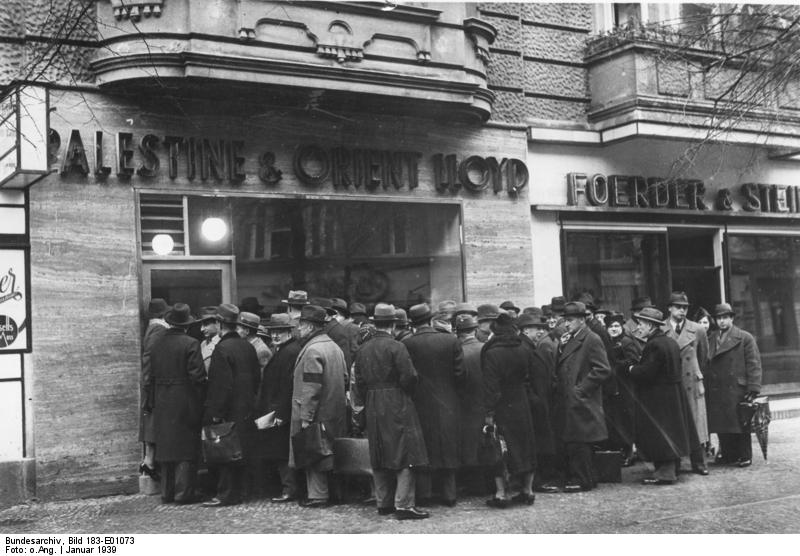
Queue for processing exit documents. Berlin, January 1939

On December 15, 1938, George Rublee, head of the Intergovernmental Committee on Refugees, met in London on behalf of the president Roosevelt with Hjalmar Schacht, a well-known German industrialist and president of the Reichsbank, to ensure the emigration from Nazi Germany Jews to the United States, Great Britain and other countries. For saving the Jews, Schacht demanded 3 billion Reichsmark, which was equal to 1 billion 200 million dollars. In January 1939, Hermann Göring entrusted further negotiations with Rublee to the adviser of the Ministry of Economics, Helmuth Wohlthat. In February 1939, Wohlthat announced his readiness to accept the plan for the emigration of 150 thousand able-bodied Jews over 3–5 years. Then their families and dependents were to follow. During this period, Germany pledged not to put pressure on the remaining Jews. The plan was supposed to be financed from capital confiscated from the Jews and additional international aid. However, due to the violation of agreements by the German authorities and the unwillingness of the United States and other countries to accept refugees, Rublee's plan was not implemented.

=== Persecution in Czechoslovakia ===
In March 1939, the Czech Republic was declared a protectorate of Germany, and Slovakia became its ally. Persecution of Jews began there as well. Emigrants were charged a very large emigration tax, which effectively meant confiscation of property. The total value of property confiscated by the Nazis from the Jews of Bohemia and Moravia was about 12 billion Czechoslovak koruna. By October 1941, when the Nazis finally banned emigration, 26,629 (according to other sources, 43,000) people had left Bohemia and Moravia. The remaining Jews were confined to ghettos, 75,765 of whom died.

=== Emigration statistics ===
Jewish emigration from Central Europe in 1933–1939:

Year	Germany	Austria	Czechoslovakia (Bohemia, Moravia)	Total number
1933	37,000	—	—	37,000
1934	23,000	—	—	23,000
1935	21,000	—	—	21,000
1936	25,000	—	—	25,000
1937	23,000	—	—	23,000
1938	47,400	62,958	—	110,358
1939	68,000	54,451	43,000	165,451
Total	244,400	117,409	43,000	404,809

By the beginning of World War II, there were 370,000 Jews remaining in Germany, Austria and the protectorate.

== World War II ==
=== Jewish refugees from Poland ===
With the beginning of the German army's invasion of Poland on September 1, 1939, a stream of Jewish refugees from that country rushed east. At first, the USSR did not hinder the Polish Jews, but then closed the borders and sent the fleeing Jews back to the territory occupied by the Germans.

I invited Schulenburg to inform him of a number of cases of forcible transfer of large groups of the Jewish population across the border into Soviet territory… I noted that when attempting to transfer these people back to German territory, German border guards open fire, resulting in dozens of people being killed. This practice is not ceasing and is becoming more widespread, I ask the ambassador to contact Berlin. —Deputy People's Commissar for Foreign Affairs V. Potemkin

According to eyewitnesses, Soviet border guards also opened fire on the refugees:

The Germans did not detain the fugitives, but with clubs and rifle butts gave them a final demonstrative lesson in their philosophy of the "racial myth" for the road; on the other side of the demarcation line, in long sheepskin coats, Budyonny-style pointed helmets and with bayonets drawn, stood the guards of the "class myth", greeting the wanderers fleeing to the promised land with unleashed shepherd dogs or fire from light machine guns.

Subsequently, in February 1940, the USSR refused Germany's offer to resettle German and Austrian Jews in Birobidzhan and Western Ukraine.

On September 21, 1939, the expulsion of Jews from the Polish territories annexed to Germany began - they were deported to the area between the Vistula and the Bug. From October 1939 to March 1940, about 95 thousand Jews were deported from Gdańsk, West Prussia, Poznań, Upper East Silesia, Vienna and Moravska Ostrava to the Lublin area.

In the autumn and winter of 1939, approximately 15,000 Polish Jews fled from Poland to Lithuania and found temporary refuge in Vilnius. In late 1940 - early 1941, 2,100 Jews from this group of refugees managed to leave for the Far East - as far as Shanghai and Japan. Assistance to these refugees was provided by a Dutch businessman, a representative of Philips and the Dutch consul in Lithuania since 1939, Jan Zwartendijk, who began issuing Jews certificates for entry into the Dutch colony of Curaçao in the Netherlands Antilles in the Caribbean Sea. The Japanese consul in Lithuania, Chiune Sugihara, issued them transit visas, since people could only reach their destination through the territory of the USSR and Japan. In total, thanks to Sugihara, from October 1940 to August 1941, 3,489 Jewish refugees from Europe entered Japan, heading primarily to the Shanghai ghetto. In early 1941, the Japanese Foreign Ministry allowed the refugees to remain in Japan or in the occupied areas of China.

In early 1940, 65,796 Jewish refugees from Poland were registered in Belarus. The total number of Jewish refugees from western Poland to the USSR is estimated by various sources at between 200,000 and 500,000 people. From the end of June 1940, after the annexation of Lithuania, Latvia, Estonia, Bessarabia and Northern Bukovina to the USSR, large-scale deportations began inland as special settlers of "socially dangerous elements" and refugees, among whom were 82-84% Jews. About 100,000 Jewish refugees were deported in this way, mainly to the northern logging sites of the USSR. Some of them subsequently joined the Polish Anders Army to take part in the fight against Nazism.

On February 18, 1943, a group of Polish Jews (369 adults and 861 children, including 719 orphans and 142 children with one or both parents) arrived in Palestine after almost 4 years of painful wanderings, including flight from Poland to the USSR, evacuation to Samarkand, transfer to Kislovodsk, and from there to Iran, an orphanage in Iran from August 1942 and travel to Palestine via India, Suez and Sinai.

=== Germany's attack on the USSR and the evacuation of Jews ===
After Germany attacked the USSR and occupied the western part of the country, Jews living in the USSR became victims of Nazi persecution. Some of them managed to evacuate to the east and south of the country. Semyon Shveibish, an employee of the Jerusalem University, wrote that by the beginning of the war, 4,855 thousand Jews lived in the USSR (excluding refugees from the occupied part of Poland and from Romania), including 4,095 thousand in the territory that was occupied during the war. Of these, 1.2-1.4 million Jews were evacuated to the Soviet rear. According to historian Dov Levin, the number of those who left for evacuation was 1-1.5 million people Historian Albert Kaganovich in his 2023 monograph "The Tashkent Front: Jewish Refugees in the Soviet Rear" believes that, considering the flight of Jews, including from places that were never occupied, the total number of Jewish refugees was over 2 million people. At the same time, no more than 100 thousand managed to evacuate from the western territories annexed to the USSR after 1939, where more than 2 million Jews lived.

Researcher Solomon Schwartz, author of the book "Jews in the Soviet Union since the Beginning of World War II," published in 1966 in New York, claimed that nothing was done in the USSR for the timely evacuation and rescue of Jews from the Nazis. However, historian Maria Potemkina believes that this thesis distorts reality. According to the Central Statistical Administration of the USSR, of the population subject to evacuation (excluding children from evacuated children's institutions) registered on September 15, 1941, the share of Jews was 24.8% (second place after Russians - 52.9%). Thus, the percentage of evacuees from the total Jewish population living in the western regions of the USSR was higher than that of representatives of other peoples, except for Russians. Dov Levin claims that the decision to evacuate did not affect the fate of the Jews in the territories annexed to the USSR in 1939 at all, since it was made when most of these territories had already been captured by the Germans. In turn, Albert Kaganovich writes that a number of post-Soviet authors, including Potemkina, adhere to the patriotic principle of "not airing dirty linen in public" and deliberately promote an embellished concept of "successful absorption" of refugees.

Both those evacuated by order of the government and those who fled on their own initiative could use the services of 128 evacuation centers, 100 refugee aid stations, and hundreds of hot water distribution points distributed along the routes from the border regions to the east as far as the Ural Mountains. However, there were also attempts to forcibly hinder the evacuation of the population, especially in the context of the rapid advance of German troops and the growing administrative chaos. Thousands of evacuees were detained at the old Soviet Polish, Soviet Latvian, etc. borders, and Soviet soldiers threatened to shoot them if they tried to reach the interior of the USSR. In other places (for example, in Bessarabia), the authorities and the military helped Jews who, both in an organized manner and spontaneously, fled to the east.

There were also problems with the transportation and resettlement of refugees after leaving the western regions of the USSR: many had to wait for trains for several days or even weeks (in early December 1941, there were 40-45 thousand people at 5-6 junction stations in Kazakhstan, including 12-15 thousand in Jambyl); the mortality rate on the way was high (in February 1942, 26 out of 240 students of a vocational school died during the move from Leningrad to Stalinsk in Novosibirsk Oblast). There are known cases of forced deportation of refugees: for example, from November 25 to December 5, 1941, 36,500 refugees from among former Polish citizens were deported from Uzbekistan to Kazakh collective farms, and on December 8, 1941, 21,500 refugees who had accumulated at the railway stations of Kazakhstan were sent to collective farms in the south of Kyrgyzstan. Even though many Jewish refugees had no experience of heavy agricultural work, people resettled on collective farms received food only on condition that they worked on them. Housing was often provided by forced resettlement with local residents. There were epidemics of malaria, typhoid and typhus, dysentery, measles, and scarlet fever. Despite the efforts of the central authorities, refugees often encountered anti-Semitism everyday among the population and local party organs.

Noting the fact of the relatively high number of evacuated Jews, researchers point out that the evacuation was carried out in areas of the former "Pale of Settlement", where there were initially more Jews than in other areas of the country. Dov Levin suggests that the fact that many Jews were members of the Communist Party, and the evacuation of party and Komsomol activists was considered one of the priorities for the Soviet government (for example, 55.2% of all members of the local Communist Party, 2,553 people, were evacuated from the Lithuanian SSR, which was occupied for just three days), influenced the increase in the percentage of Jews among the evacuees compared to the percentage in the population. Summarizing the situation, Levin concludes that "the view accepted in pro-Soviet circles, according to which the Soviet government organized the rescue of its Jewish citizens during the Second World War, has no basis."

=== Ghettos and deportations to death camps ===
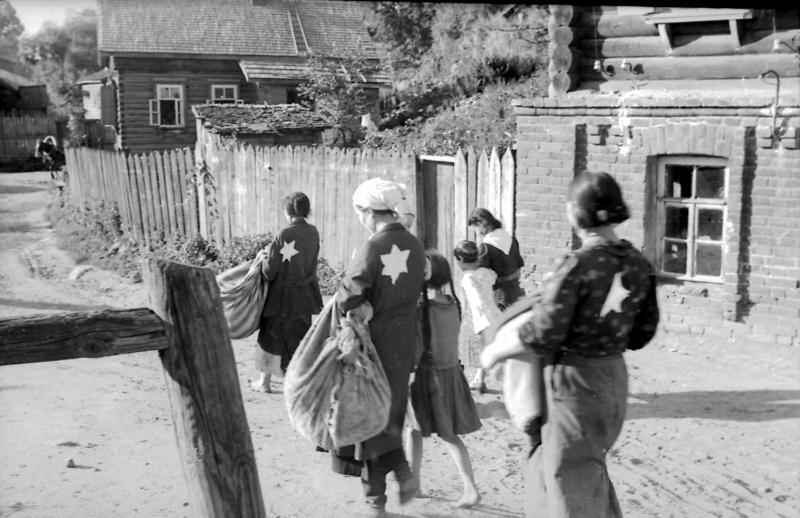
The deportation of Jews in Mogilev in July 1941

In the cities of the occupied territory, Jewish ghettos were created, where the Nazis drove the entire Jewish population of the city and its environs under threat of death. The largest ghettos in the USSR were the Lvov and Minsk ghettos. Later, the ghetto population was exterminated or taken to death camps.

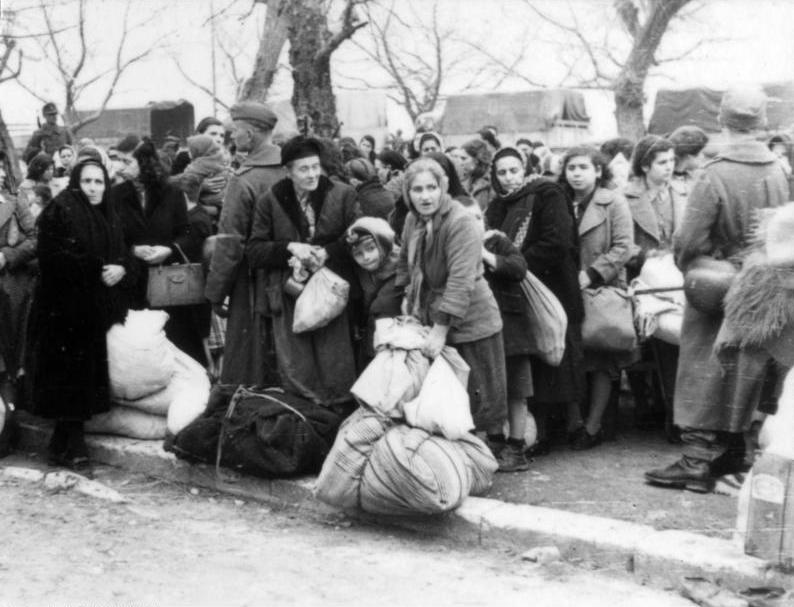
Deportation of Jews from Greece. Ioannina, March 25, 1944

The number of Soviet Jews who ended up in the territory occupied by the Germans amounted to 2.75–2.9 million people, almost all of them died. Thus, by December 1941, 80% of the 300,000 Jews in the Baltics had been killed by the Nazis and their accomplices.

At the same time, Jewish ghettos were created in the occupied countries of Eastern Europe, primarily in Poland. All Jews, including Jews from Western Europe, were also forcibly resettled there under threat of death. The largest was the Warsaw Ghetto, which held about 450 thousand prisoners, and there were also large ghettos in the cities of Łódź, Kraków, Białystok, and Lublin.

The Nazis and their collaborators deported almost 76 thousand Jews from France, and only 3% of them survived the Holocaust. 100 thousand Dutch Jews died in extermination camps. In total, about 800 ghettos were created, which held at least a million Jews. Most of the Jews resettled in ghettos in Europe were killed by the Nazis.

== Refugee Reception Statistics ==
Countries that accepted Jewish refugees in 1933–1943 (except for those temporarily evacuated during the war deep into the USSR):

Country	Number of accepted (thousands)	%
United States	190	23,4
Palestine	120	14,8
England	65	8
France	55	6,8
Netherlands	35	4,3
Belgium	30	3,7
Switzerland	16	1,9
Spain	12	1,5
Other European countries	70	8,8
Argentina	50	6,2
Brazil	25	3,1
Chile	14	1,7
Bolivia	12	1,5
Uruguay	7	0,8
Other Latin American countries	20	2,4
China	25	3,1
Australia	9	1,1
South Africa	8	1
Canada	8	1
Other countries	40	4,9
Total:	811	100

The countries that had taken in the most Jewish refugees from the Third Reich (as a percentage of their own population) before the war—France, Belgium, and Holland—were themselves soon occupied by the Nazis, leaving the Jews with virtually nowhere else to go. The United States, which took in the most refugees in terms of total numbers, could have saved many more if it had wanted to, according to many commentators, since it took in a tiny fraction of its population—1/1000. The total number of Jewish displaced persons is estimated at 7 million, most of whom died.

== Aftermath of World War II ==
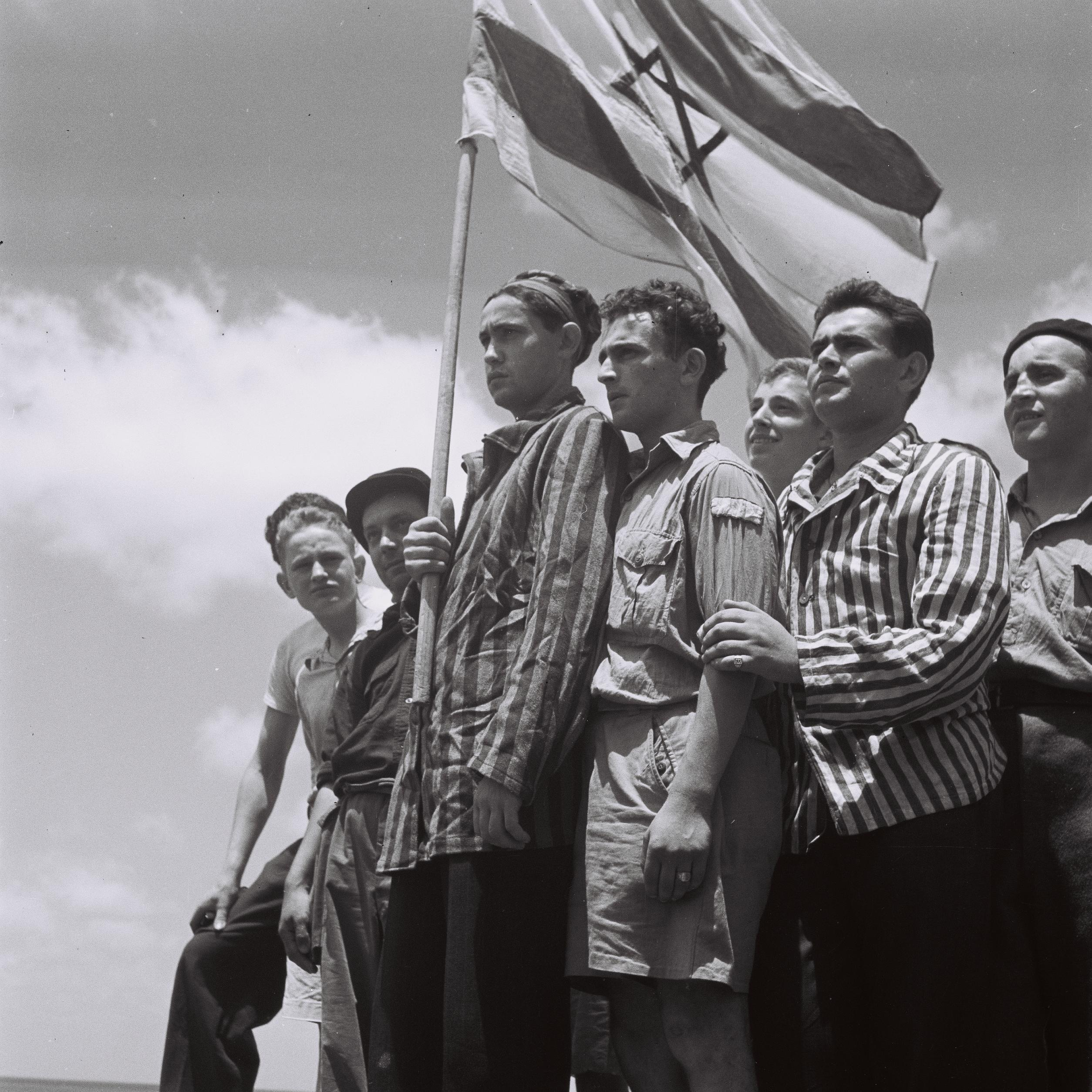
Buchenwald prisoners arrive in Haifa, July 15, 1945

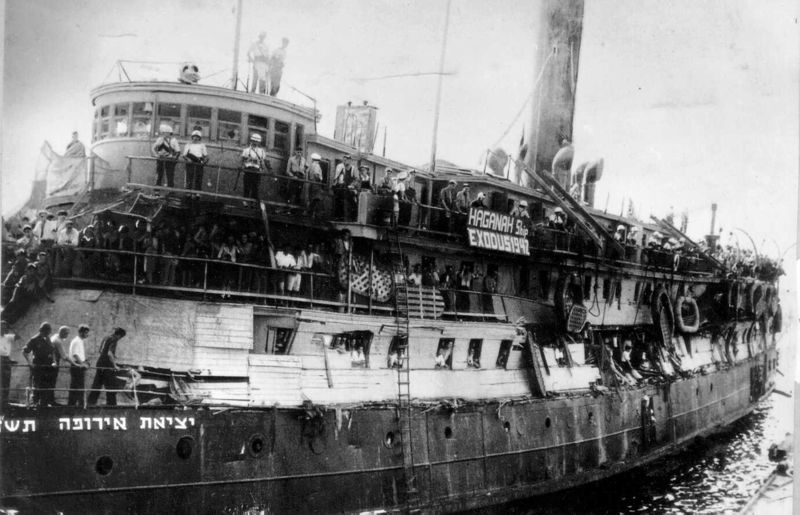
Haganah's Exodus-1947 - Symbol of Illegal Jewish Immigration to Palestine

After the end of the war, many refugees continued to seek refuge in Palestine. By the end of the war, more than 200,000 Jews were in refugee camps in Europe.

In Poland, the Jews who survived the Holocaust were again persecuted. The unwillingness of the Poles to return Jewish property appropriated during the war and conflicts with the new government, which included Jews, led to numerous attacks on Jews - from November 1944 to December 1945, 351 Jews were killed in such attacks. The largest of the anti-Semitic actions was the pogrom in Kielce on July 4, 1946, during which 42 Jews were killed and more than 40 were wounded. These events caused a mass emigration of Jewish survivors from Poland. Of the 380,000 Polish Jews who survived the Holocaust, 100,000 remained in Poland by the end of 1946. Pogroms and the growth of anti-Semitism were also observed in Hungary and other countries of post-war Europe. The underground organization Bricha helped refugees reach Palestine.

During the period 1945–1948, 66 ships with 70,000 illegal immigrants arrived in Palestine. Of these, 64 ships were sent from Europe and two from North Africa. However, Great Britain continued to pursue a strict policy of restricting immigration towards the surviving victims of the Holocaust; from the autumn of 1946, illegal refugees were deported to special concentration camps created in Cyprus, where 51,500 people were interned. Passengers of ships carrying illegal immigrants often put up fierce resistance to the British during deportation, which sometimes led to casualties among the refugees, for example, three were killed and 28 were wounded when the ship Exodus-1947 was captured by British sailors. The violence against refugees and the outrage of the world community over these facts played a significant role in the discussion of the decision to partition Palestine and create the State of Israel.

After the creation of Israel in May 1948, its government declared repatriation an inalienable right of every Jew. The report of the Special Subcommittee on Displaced Persons of the Judiciary Committee of the US House of Representatives of January 20, 1950, stated that Israel allows all Jews into the country regardless of any criteria, regardless of age, profession, social status, etc. The last camp for Jewish displaced persons in Germany was closed in 1953.

In the USSR, the re-evacuation of Jews encountered problems. Those returning were often met with hostility both due to the massive impact of Nazi propaganda during the occupation and in connection with attempts by Jews to return housing and property seized by their neighbors during their absence. The situation is particularly difficult in Ukraine, where several anti-Semitic incidents have occurred, including pogroms and murders.

== Obstacles to refugees and rescue attempts ==
Many countries, fearing an influx of refugees, created obstacles and refused to grant them entry permits. Even news of the mass murder of Jews by the Nazis did not become a reason to revise the anti-immigration policy.

The authorities of pre-war France, which was experiencing the effects of the global economic crisis, feared that Jewish refugees would worsen the problem of unemployment. Already at the end of 1933, the representative of France in the Office of the High Commissioner for Refugees announced that France would only be a transit country, but not a final destination for refugees. The mass deportation of Polish Jews from France in the autumn of 1938 provoked the unemployed Herschel Grynszpan to attempt to assassinate the German diplomat Ernst vom Rath, who died of his wounds two days later. The Nazi Germany regime took advantage of this assassination attempt to carry out a mass pogrom against the Jewish community under the slogan "Revenge for the murder of Ernst vom Rath", which became known as "Kristallnacht".

Many refugees, especially from Germany and Austria, sought to reach neutral Switzerland. However, the Swiss authorities, fearing an influx of refugees, already in the second half of the 1930s banned immigration and allowed only transit. From October 1938, at the request of the Swiss government, Third Reich border guards stamped the passports of departing Jews with the stamp "J" - "Jude" (Jew). In August 1942, the Swiss Federal Police issued an instruction according to which "refugees who have become such solely due to persecution on racial grounds cannot be considered political emigrants". Many German, Austrian and French Jews were handed over to the Nazis or deported back. The Swiss who helped Jews cross the border illegally were subject to criminal prosecution.

In 1937, due to the impossibility of legal immigration to Palestine for most of the Jewish refugees, the Zionists created an organization for illegal immigration – Mossad LeAliyah Bet. Before the proclamation of Israel in 1948, this organization illegally transported more than 16,000 Jews to Palestine before the end of the war and more than 70,000 from 1945 to 1948.

The White Paper of British colonial secretary Malcolm MacDonald was published on May 7, 1939, after the failure of the St James's Palace Conference regarding the future of the Palestine Mandate. It stated that "the aim of His Majesty's Government is to establish within ten years an independent Palestinian State." Over the next five years, the number of Jewish immigrants was not to exceed 75,000 people, and the Jewish population was to be no more than 1/3 of the population of Palestine. After 5 years, the entry of Jews into the country was prohibited "if the Arabs of Palestine object to immigration," and the purchase of land by Jews was prohibited or limited. However, Arab immigration was not limited.

By 1944, out of 75 thousand immigration visas, only 51 thousand were used. The restrictions were slightly relaxed, and Great Britain allowed the entry of Jewish refugees into Palestine in the amount of up to 18 thousand people per year. Haganah and other underground Jewish groups in Palestine tried to hinder the immigration policy of the British authorities. Thus, in November 1940, in the Haifa roadstead, Haganah bombers blew up the ship Patria, which had 1,700 immigrants from Europe on board, in the hope of preventing the forced deportation of refugees to Mauritius. According to the organizers of the explosion, the plan was to damage one of the compartments with the explosion, but the hole was too big, and 250 refugees drowned.

A similar policy against Jewish immigration was carried out by the United States - over a 10-year period, from 1933 to 1943, the total number of unused quotas in the United States was 1,244,858. American historian Joseph Telushkin notes that according to public opinion polls, "the majority of Americans were against the access of a significant number of Jewish refugees to the country." The attitude in the United States to the problem of Jewish refugees before entering the war was characterized by Chaim Weizmann in his book "Trials and Errors", published in 1949:

It was a nightmare, especially since it was necessary to remain silent. To speak publicly about the danger in which European Jews found themselves was to "conduct propaganda."

The quintessence of Canadian immigration policy was the statement of one of the employees of the relevant department: in response to the question of how many Jews Canada could accept, he replied: None is Too Many. As a result, Canada accepted fewer refugees than any other Western country.

The most famous example of anti-immigration policy towards Jewish refugees was the fate of the steamship St. Louis, which left Hamburg for Cuba on May 13, 1939, with 936 passengers on board, including 930 Jews. Even though large sums of money were paid for tickets and a guarantee of return in case of refusal to accept, and the majority had a Cuban visa, the Jews were unable to disembark in Cuba. Cuba accepted only 27 passengers of the St. Louis. The passengers of the steamship were also unable to disembark in the United States or Latin American countries. Direct appeals to US president Roosevelt to save at least some of the passengers, including more than 400 women and children, were of no help. The American Jewish Joint Distribution Committee made gigantic efforts, hiring lawyers and offering large sums of money as guarantees, but all was in vain. The ship headed back to Europe. By the time of its arrival in June, an agreement had been reached that 2/3 of the refugees would be accepted by Belgium, Holland and France, and 1/3 by Great Britain. Moreover, it was emphasized that this precedent would not be the basis for making decisions in the future. As a result, it is estimated that only 288 of the passengers of the St. Louis who disembarked in England and 278 of the 619 who disembarked in Antwerp and were accepted by France, Belgium and Holland survived the Holocaust and the war.

In addition to accepting Jewish refugees, there was also the problem of repatriating its own Jewish citizens who found themselves under German occupation. After 1943, Spain created serious problems for the repatriation of its own citizens of Jewish nationality from France and Greece, although they were in mortal danger. Similar problems arose with the repatriation of Turkish Jews.

The transportation of Jews by sea during the war often ended with the death of ships and passengers. Thus, on February 24, 1942, in the Black Sea, the Soviet submarine Shch-213 sank the Bulgarian ship Struma with 769 refugees on board, only one passenger was saved. On August 5, 1944, a Soviet submarine sank the Romanian ship Mefkura with more than 300 Jewish refugees on board on its way to Palestine.

On April 19–30, 1943, the Anglo-American Bermuda Conference was held, dedicated to the problem of refugees from the countries occupied by the Nazis. The Bermuda Conference failed to even repeal the White Paper of 1939, which limited Jewish immigration to Palestine to an insignificant figure of 75 thousand people over 5 years compared to the total number of refugees, although this was one of the most important demands of Jewish organizations. The only achievement of the Bermuda Conference was the resumption of the activities of the Intergovernmental Committee on Refugees, which was created at the Évian Conference.

By October 1, 1943, in less than three weeks, 7 thousand Jews from Denmark were transported to neutral Sweden by the Danish anti-Nazi underground. The Nazis managed to deport only 472 Danish Jews to concentration camps. In Norway, they managed to save 930 of the approximately 1,800 Jews, also transporting them to Sweden. In 1944, Swedish diplomat Raoul Wallenberg managed to save thousands of Jews in Budapest in Hungary using forged documents.

The last major attempt to save Jews was made in 1944 by Rudolf Kastner. He negotiated with the Nazis to allow Jews to leave the occupied territories for neutral countries in exchange for the delivery of 10,000 trucks with food for the German army ("Blood for goods"). An agreement was not reached, but Kastner managed to get 1,686 Hungarian Jews to leave for Switzerland by paying a large sum of money.

== Holocaust Victim Compensation ==
As a result of the persecution and extermination of Jews during the Holocaust, a huge number of people lost their property and suffered material deprivation. At the same time, Jewish property was often appropriated by persecutors and simply neighbors and was also confiscated by the states where they lived.

On September 20, 1945, the chairman of the Jewish Agency, Chaim Weizmann, appealed to the governments of the four powers that occupied Germany with a request to return the Jewish property confiscated by the Nazis to their owners, and if the owners were no longer alive, then to transfer the property to authorized Jewish organizations that would spend the funds on the rehabilitation of the health of Holocaust victims. Later, in 1951, the State of Israel officially made similar demands.

Israel demanded that Germany reimburse the costs of accepting 500 thousand people - refugees from Europe - on its territory. The costs were estimated at $3,000 per person, for a total of $1.5 billion. In addition, a demand was made to compensate for the loss of property in the amount of $6 billion. The United States, Great Britain and France declared that they were bound to Germany by the Paris Reparations Treaty and could not demand new reparations. The Soviet Union ignored the demands.

However, in September 1951, German chancellor Konrad Adenauer declared his readiness to discuss the possibility of paying compensation, and on September 10, 1952, an agreement was signed under which Germany was to pay Israel 3 billion marks in goods over 14 years. An agreement was also signed with the Claims Conference on the adoption of laws for the direct payment of compensation to victims of Nazi persecution and the payment of 450 million German marks to assist in rehabilitation and resettlement. In addition, under the Federal Compensation Act of September 18, 1953, certain categories of individuals and legal entities were entitled to compensation, including 270 thousand Jews. Several other compensation programs were subsequently adopted, under which tens and hundreds of thousands more people received payments. The total amount of compensation paid was more than 50 billion dollars.

Several governments that had previously been occupied by the Nazis and their Nazi-allied countries in Europe also committed themselves, decades after the war, to the restitute of Jewish property that had been confiscated in 1939–1945, as well as by the communist regimes of Eastern Europe after the end of the war. Such programs were adopted in Hungary, Poland, Norway, Belgium and Lithuania.

Significant funds from Holocaust victims were appropriated by Swiss banks. Several lawsuits were held in 1996–1998, as a result of which Swiss banks were obliged to pay Holocaust victims $1.25 billion and publish a list of unclaimed accounts from that time to search for owners and heirs.

== Representation in Art ==
The most famous literary work describing the fate of Jewish refugees was the best-selling novel Exodus by American writer Leon Uris, published in 1958 and published in 50 languages with a total circulation of over 7 million copies. The main historical background of the novel is the return of Jews to Eretz Israel from the end of the 19th century until the creation of the State of Israel. A film of the same name was made based on this book in 1960 and the musical Ari was staged on Broadway in 1971.

Winfried Sebald's novel The Emigrants tells, among other things, about the persecution of Jews in pre-war Germany. This topic is also raised in Remarque's novels Flotsam and Shadows in Paradise.

The documentary film Shanghai Ghetto (2002) tells the story of German Jews who fled Nazi persecution and ended up in China in the late 1930s.

== Literature ==
- Basin, Yakov Zinovievich. The Jewish Question and the Emigration Policy of Germany and the USA in 1933-38. Notes on Jewish History: Magazine. October (issue 16 (119)). 2009.
- Gutman I. Jews in Anders' Army, formed in the USSR. Daniil Romanovsky, David Zilberklang. Yad Vashem: studies: collection. Jerusalem: Yad Vashem, Vol. 2. pp. 121–176. 2010. ISSN 1565-9941.
- Albert Kaganovich. "Tashkent Front": Jewish Refugees in the Soviet Rear. Moscow: M. Greenberg Library; Bookmen, 2023. p. 448. ISBN 978-965-93014-5-4.
- Gennady Kostyrchenko. Stalin's Secret Policy: Power and Anti-Semitism. - 2. Moscow: International Relations, p. 784. 2003. ISBN 978-5-7133-1071-4.
- Dov Levin. A Fateful Decision: The Flight of Jews to the Interior of the USSR in the Summer of 1941. Jerusalem: Yad Vashem, V. 1. 2009. ISSN 1565-9941.
- Dov Levin. The Attitude of the Soviet Union towards the Rescue of Jews. Ed. by Michael Robert Marrus. Part 8: Bystanders to the Holocaust. The Nazi Holocaust: Historical Articles on the Destruction of European Jews. Munich: De Gruyter Saur, Vol. 3. pp. 1118–1129. 1989. ISBN 978-0-88736-268-2.
- Dan Michman. The Catastrophe of European Jewry. - 1. - Tel Aviv: Open University of Israel, Vol. 2. 2001. ISBN 978-965-06-0233-8.
- Dan Michman. The Catastrophe of European Jewry. - 1. - Tel Aviv: Open University of Israel, Vol. 3. 2001. ISBN 978-965-06-0233-8.
- Dan Michman. The Catastrophe of European Jewry. - 1. - Tel Aviv: Open University of Israel, Vol. 6. 2001. ISBN 978-965-06-0233-8.
- Lilly Mousse. A Call to the Nations. Minsk: Encyclopedics, p. 256. 500 copies. 2007. ISBN 978-985-6742-59-3.
- Tolochko D. M. The Problem of Refugees from Poland in Soviet-German Relations (September 1939 - June 1940). Journal of Russian and East European Historical Research. No. 1 (4). pp. 66–76. 2012. ISSN 2409-1413
- Samuel Ettinger. Part Six. The Newest Period. Chapter Six. The Nazis' Rise to Power in Germany and the Genocide of European Jewry during World War II. History of the Jewish People. Jerusalem: Aliya Library, pp. 541–560, p. 687. 3000 copies. 2001. ISBN 978-5-93273-050-8.
- Statistical data. The destruction of Jews in the USSR during the German occupation (1941-1944). Collection of documents and materials. Yitzhak Arad. Jerusalem: Yad Vashem, 1991. p. 424. ISBN 978-965-308-010-2.
- Holocaust. Resistance. Revival. The Jewish People during World War II and the Post-War Period (1939-1948) Study Guide edited by I. Altman and P. Agmon. - Moscow: Holocaust Foundation, p. 344. 2000. ISBN 978-5-89897-005-5.
- Yehuda Bauer. American Jewry and the Holocaust: The American Jewish Joint Distribution Committee, 1939-1945. Wayne State University Press, p. 522. 1981. ISBN 978-0-8143-1672-6.
- Marion A. Kaplan. Between Dignity and Despair: Jewish Life in Nazi Germany. New York: Oxford University Press, p. 304. 1998. (Studies in Jewish History). ISBN 978-0-19-513092-8.
- Thomas Albrich. Escapé Throwgh Austria: Evish Refugees and the Austrian Route to Palestine. Tylor & Francis Group, 2006. ISBN 978-0-7146-5213-9.
- Irving Abella, Harold Troper. None Is Too Many: Canada and the Jews of Europe, 1933-1948. Toronto: Key Porter Books, p. 340. 2002. ISBN 978-1-55263-289-5.
- Marion Bergnann. Continental Britons: German-Jewish Refugees from Nazi Germany. Bergnann Books, 2006. ISBN 978-1-84545-090-8.
- Walter Laqueur. Generation Exodus: The Fate of Young Jewish Refugees from Nazi Germany. University Press of New England, 2001. ISBN 978-1-58465-106-2
- Louise London. Whitehall and The Jews, 1933—1948: British Immigration Policy, Jewish Refugees, and the Holocaust, 1933—1948. Cambridge University Press, p. 327. 2000. ISBN 978-0-521-53449-9.
- Pamela Rotner Sakamoto. Japanese Diplomats and Jewish Refugees. Praeger Publishers, p. 216. 1998. ISBN 978-0-275-96199-2.
