= Rublee-Wohlthat-Plan =

The Rublee-Wohlthat-Plan was an unrealized draft of an intergovernmental agreement on organizing the emigration of Jews from Nazi Germany and Austria, discussed in 1938-1939.

It was planned to ensure the emigration of 150,000 able-bodied Jews from Nazi Germany to the United States, Great Britain, and other countries over the course of 3-5 years, using the emigrants' own funds and international aid, and then all other Jews. The plan failed due to the reluctance of other countries to accept refugees and the policies of the Nazis, who ignored preliminary agreements.

== Previous events ==
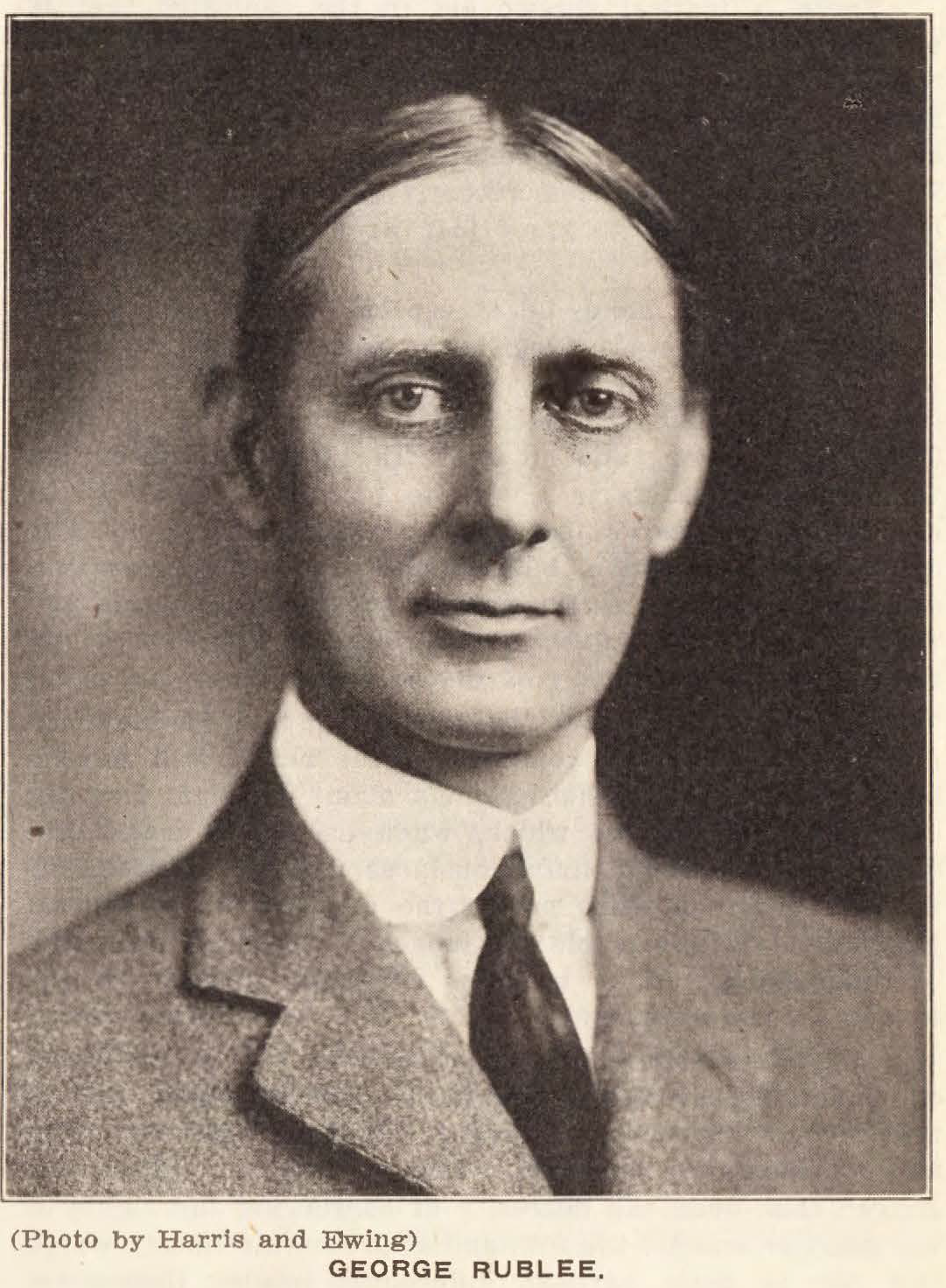
George Rublee

In 1933, the National Socialists came to power in Germany, whose attitude towards Jews was based on the ideas of racial anti-Semitism. The persecution of Jews resulted in mass emigration. In 1933-1937, 130 thousand Jews left Germany. After the Anschluss of Austria by the Nazis in March 1938, the exodus of Jews from that country began.

In July 1938, at the intergovernmental Évian Conference on the refugee problem, convened at the initiative of US President Franklin Roosevelt, it was decided to create in London the Intergovernmental Committee on Refugees. (ICR, IGCR) from representatives of the countries participating in the conference. On August 6, the US representative, lawyer George Rublee, was elected executive director of the committee. Rublee requested permission to negotiate with Germany, but his departure was delayed due to the Munich Agreement.

The main problem was that other countries refused to accept Jewish refugees or accepted them in insignificant numbers. Because of the isolationist and anti-immigrant sentiments that prevailed in the United States at the time, the Roosevelt administration could neither ease restrictions on Jewish entry into the United States nor even provide funds to finance emigration to other countries. The conference was essentially a demonstration of the desire to “do something for the Jews” without any possibility of changing the situation.

== Agreements between Rublee and German representatives ==
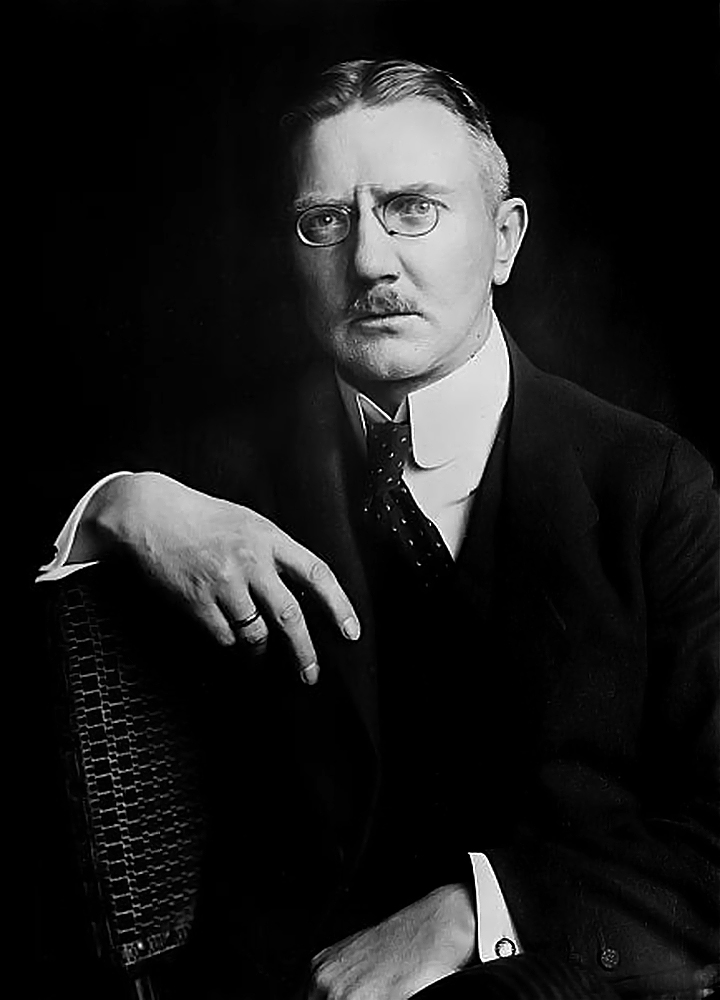
Hjalmar Schacht

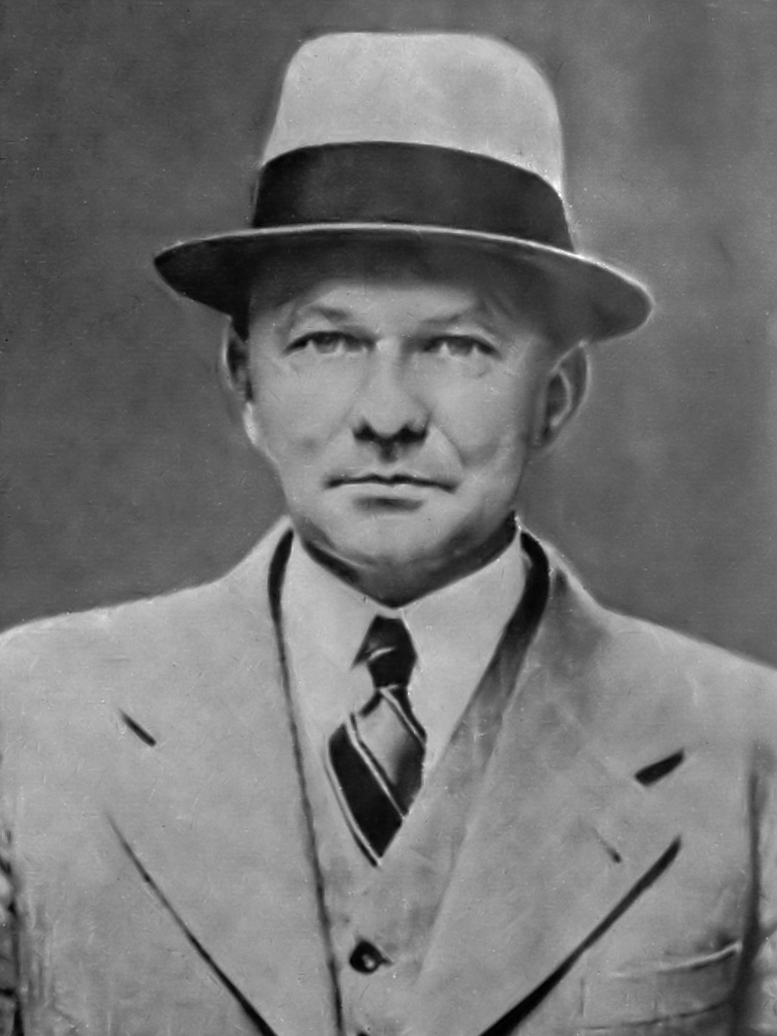
Helmuth Wohlthat

Initially, Reich Minister of Economics Hermann Göring assigned the development of the details of the agreement to the Austrian Minister of Economics Hans Fischböck. After the events of Kristallnacht, Göring and President of the Reichsbank, Hjalmar Schacht agreed that Schacht would take on this project. The initial initiative came directly from Adolf Hitler, who also supervised the course of the negotiations.

On December 15, 1938, Rublee, on behalf of US President Franklin Roosevelt, met with Schacht in London. He tried to convince the German authorities to give Jews the opportunity to emigrate with part of their capital to interest other countries in their immigration. Rublee proposed that Schacht develop a program for the emigration of all able-bodied Jews living in Germany within five years - both German citizens and stateless persons. As a supplement to the Haavara Agreement concluded in 1933 on Jewish immigration to Palestine, the new agreement was to facilitate immigration to many other countries as well. The US State Department was positive about this idea, while Great Britain and France, on the contrary, were skeptical.

For saving the Jews, Schacht demanded 3 billion Reichsmarks, which was equal to 1 billion 200 million dollars. Despite the ultimatum nature of Schacht's offer and the absurdity of the sum, the negotiations continued. On Roosevelt's instructions, Rublee went to Berlin, where he stayed from 11 January to 2 February 1939.

However, according to German Foreign Minister Joachim von Ribbentrop, Schacht, by arranging these negotiations, had encroached on the sphere of authority of the Foreign Ministry. Schacht referred to a direct instruction from Hitler and Göring. As a result, after Schacht's removal from the post of chairman of the Reichsbank on January 20, 1939, Göring entrusted further negotiations with Rublee to the adviser of the Ministry of Economics, Helmuth Wohlthat.

On February 1, Rublee drew up a top-secret memorandum with a draft agreement based on the results of negotiations with Schacht and Wohlthat, which, among other things, contained the following points:

- Definition of belonging to Jews according to the Nuremberg Laws.
- Division of Jews into "hired workers" (able-bodied Jews aged 15 to 45), "eligible for material assistance", "elderly and infirm" (aged 45 and over), and "undesirable".
- Initial departure abroad of about 150,000 "hired workers" over a period of 3-5 years.
- Division into "Aryans" and "non-Aryans" as long as German jobs are occupied by Jewish "hired workers".
- Establishment of a trust fund with a board of two German and two foreign trustees, consisting of 25% Jewish assets - for the purchase of inventory, travel and freight costs, and to support housing projects for migrants.
- The maintenance of persons unable to earn a living must be made primarily from Jewish assets in Germany, not including the portion transferred to a trust fund.
- Advance of 150,000 foreign currency to emigrants as "immigration aid" from ICR member countries and subsequent transfer of trust fund assets at a favorable exchange rate.
- Involvement of the Haavara company in transfer shipments within the previously approved limits.
- Organizational regulation regarding passports, training in new specialties and the transport of permitted goods.

The benefit to Germany from such a solution, which Schacht saw and supported, was that while Germany was getting rid of the Jews, it would simultaneously gain substantial exports of its goods with the subsequent demand for service and spare parts. Schacht had previously obtained Hitler's approval for this plan. A key part of the plan was a trust fund of 6 billion Reichsmarks, or $2.4 billion, the idea of which was Fischböck.

The draft treaty did not contain any indication of how the Jewish assets were to be transferred to the fund or the planned maintenance (such as seizure of property).

The US and UK governments supported the agreement. Jewish leaders were divided - some were for some were against. Many of them believed that the confiscation of Jewish property and their expulsion from Germany could not be supported. One of the key problems was the requirement for Jewish organizations to raise $600 million. By comparison, the entire budget of the Joint in 1939 was $8.1 million, of which $1 million was spent on solving the problem of refugees on the steamship St. Louis.

== Failure of the plan ==
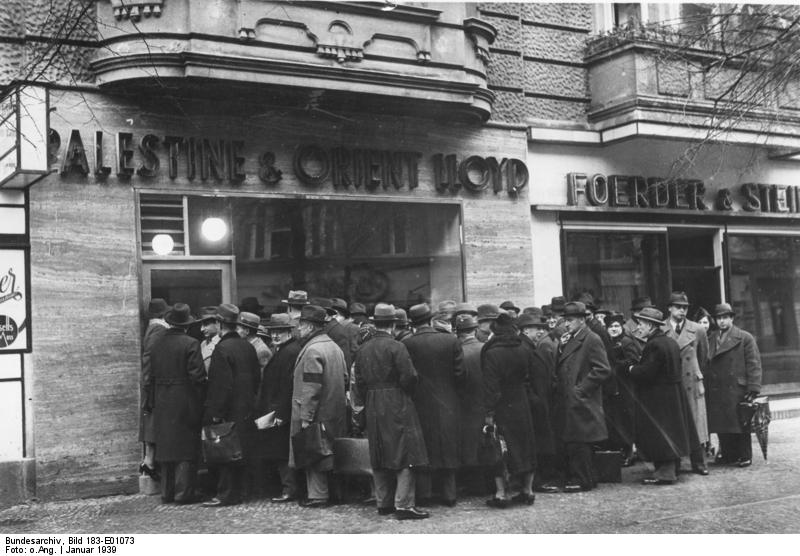
Queue for exit documents in Berlin, January 1939.

However, contrary to the preliminary agreements, on February 11, 1939, at a meeting of the Reich Central Office for Jewish Emigration, Reinhard Heydrich declared that the Rublee plan should not be relied upon, and that emigration should be stimulated by all available means. The Nazi plan for the Jews, according to historian Yehuda Bauer, consisted of simultaneously pursuing two policies: negotiations on their "sale" and simultaneous robbery and expulsion from the country. Getting rid of the Jews was achieved in any case, regardless of the success or failure of negotiations with the West.

At the ICR meeting on February 13-14, 1939, the governments of the countries represented on the committee agreed to "promote the possibility of permanent settlement of forced emigrants" from Germany over the next five years, "within the framework of the laws and normal practice of the governments of the member countries." In essence, the members of the committee refused any specific commitments regarding admission quotas, but simply "recognized" the creation of a private international organization for cooperation in financing emigration. As a result of the meeting, Rublee announced his resignation after six months as ICR executive director. He was replaced by Sir Herbert Emerson, High Commissioner for Refugees to the League of Nations.

Herbert Pell was entrusted with further negotiations. But on February 21, Göring issued a decree requiring German Jews to surrender all items made of precious metals to the authorities within two weeks at a fixed price. On February 25, Jewish organizations in Germany were instructed to provide the police with daily lists of one hundred people who were to leave Germany within two weeks. This violated all the preliminary agreements between Rublee and Wohlthat. Moreover, there were no countries yet that were ready to accept these refugees.

On March 3, Pell went to Berlin to negotiate with Wohlthat with a preliminary plan for emigration calculated for 3-5 years. Pell had previously agreed with Emerson on the sending of commissions from the United States and Great Britain to select places for future emigration, while simultaneously working out the issue of financing.

Wohlthat, in turn, intended to support the mass emigration according to Heydrich's plan. Wohlthat made a request for readiness to accept refugees: it turned out that in the USA and other countries, work on preparing for the reception of refugees was at an early stage. In May, a delegation of German Jews in London also did not receive any documentary evidence of readiness to facilitate the emigration of Jews from Germany.

Moreover, without assuming that the alternative to the "ransom" of German Jews would be mass extermination, some Jewish organizations in the USA and Europe, especially from the left side of the political spectrum, opposed the plan. They feared that such an agreement would provoke other countries, in particular Poland and Romania, to similar actions against Jews. These organizations also participated in organizing an anti-German boycott, and the plan assumed that Jews would essentially become "sellers" of German goods supplied in exchange for the confiscated Jewish property. The situation became even more complicated after Great Britain published the White Paper on May 17, 1939. Under pressure from the Arabs, Britain limited Jewish immigration to Palestine to no more than 75,000 people over the next 5 years.

The dim prospects of the organized emigration plan encouraged the Nazi authorities, led by Heydrich, to increase pressure on the Jewish community with demands to leave the territory of the Reich. In the end, due to the lack of real opportunities for resettlement and its financing, the Rublee plan completely failed and lost its relevance with the outbreak of World War II.

According to Yehuda Bauer, this plan had no chance of success from the very beginning and the blame for this lies primarily with the Allies. The Jews could not raise the amount of money that the Nazis demanded, the Nazis were captivated by the false concept of "Jewish omnipotence" and did not believe that they could not "put pressure" on the governments of other countries, and Western countries saw the Jews as "hostile strangers". General decency would have been enough for the governments of democratic countries to solve this problem. This would not only save hundreds of thousands of people, but also help in the coming war, since many of these people joined the Allied armies. But it required a different mindset, priorities and goals for the Western powers than existed at the time.

== Literature ==
- Basin Ya. Z. The Jewish Question and the Migration Policy of Germany and the USA in 1933-38. Magazine. Issue 16 (119). October, 2009.
- Mikhman D. The Catastrophe of European Jewry. Tel Aviv. Open University of Israel. volume=2. 2001. ISBN 965-06-0233-X
- Yehuda Bauer. American Jewry and the Holocaust: The American Jewish Joint Distribution Committee, 1939-1945. Wayne State University Press. p. 522. 1981. ISBN 978-0814316726
- Yehuda Bauer. The Rublee-Schacht episode and the coordinating foundation. My Brother's Keeper. A History of the American Jewish Joint Distribution Committee 1929-1939. Philadelphia. The Jewish Publication Society of America. 1974. ISBN 0-8276-0048-8
- Yehuda Bauer. The Jewish emergence from powerlessness. Toronto, Buffalo, London. University of Toronto Press. pp. 90. 1979. ISBN 0-8020-6354-3
- Yehuda Bauer. Jews for sale?: Nazi-Jewish negotiations, 1933-1945. New Haven and London. Yale University Press. pp. 306. ISBN 978-0-30006-852-8
- Brechtken M. Madagaskar für die Juden" : antisemitische Idee und politische Praxis 1885 - 1945. R. Oldenbourg Verlag GmbH. pp. 336. 1987. ISBN 3-486-56384-X
- Geerken H. Hitler's Asian Adventure. Books on Demand. pp. 572. 2007. ISBN 9783738630138
- Kieffer F. [https://books.google.de/books?id=8_DI1N212MYC&pg=PA409#v=onepage&q&f=false Judenverfolgung in Deutschland — eine innere Angelegenheit?: internationale Reaktionen auf die Flüchtlingsproblematik, 1933-1939. Franz Steiner Verlag. pp. 409-419, p. 520. 2002. ISBN 9783515080255
- Penkower M. N. Decision on Palestine Deferred: America, Britain and Wartime Diplomacy, 1939-1945. Routledge. pp. 402. 2013. ISBN 9781135289102
- Vogel Rolf (Hrsg.) Ein Stempel hat gefehlt. Dokumente zur Emigration deutscher Juden. Droemer-Knaur. p. 246-251, pp.367. 1977. ISBN 342605602X
