= Intergovernmental Committee on Refugees =

- The Intergovernmental Committee on Refugees (ICR)
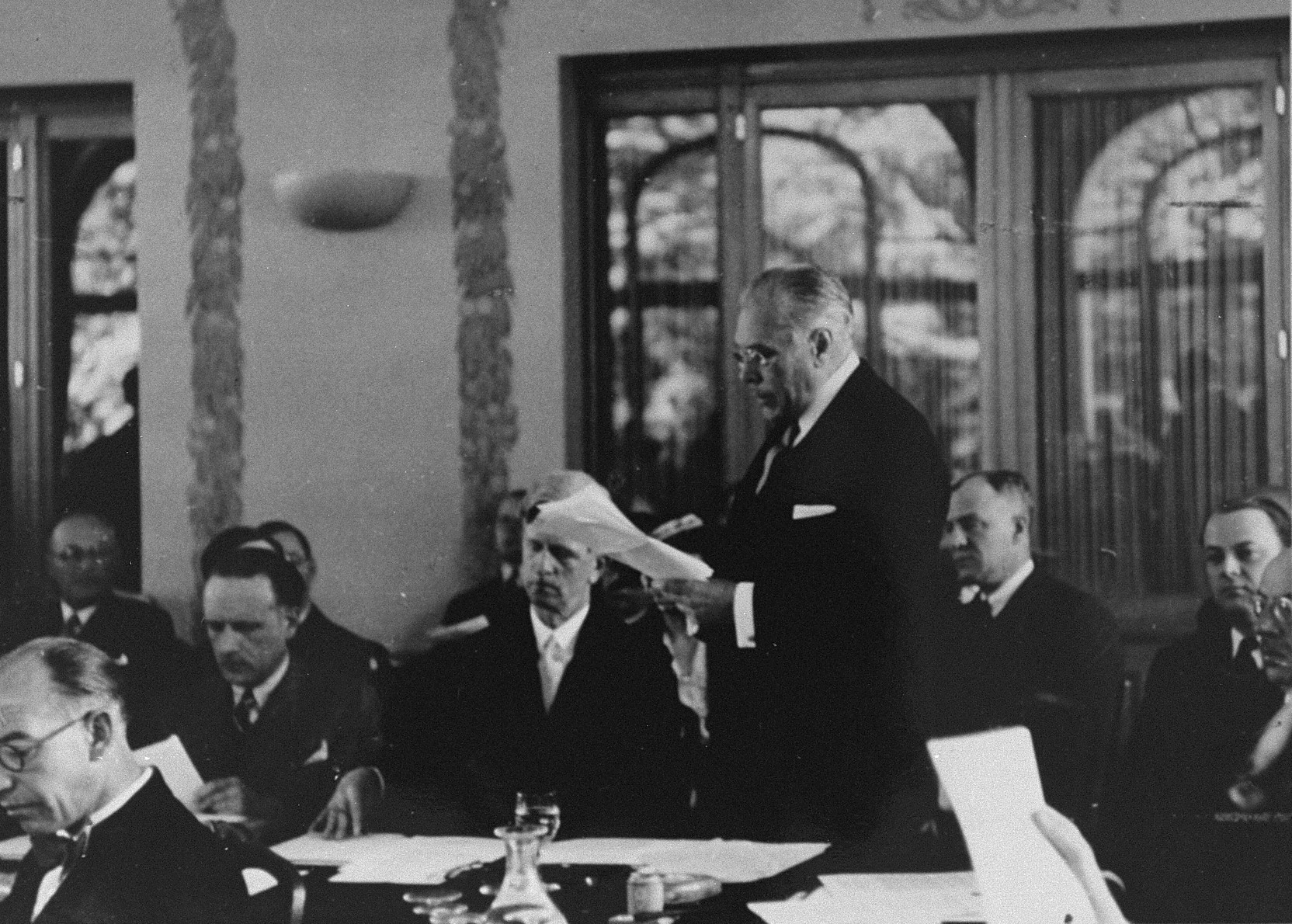
- Myron Taylor opens the Évian Conference
- Abbreviation: ICR
- Successor: International Refugee Organization
- Formation: July 14, 1938; 88 years ago
- Founder: League of Nations
- Founded at: Évian-les-Bains, France
- Dissolved: July 1, 1947; 79 years ago
- Type: Nonprofit organization
- Legal status: Non-profit organization
- Purpose: Administer intergovernmental efforts to resettle refugees from Nazi Germany
- Headquarters: London
- Location: UK
- Region served: Nazi Germany and all of Europe
- Key people: George Rublee (US), Myron Taylor (US), Herbert Emerson (UK), Edward Winterton (UK), Henry Bérenger (France)
- Main organ: League of Nations
- Parent organization: League of Nations

The Intergovernmental Committee on Refugees (ICR), also known as the Intergovernmental Committee for Political Refugees or the Évian Committee (French: Comité d'Évian), abbreviated as IGC, or sometimes IGCR, was formed on July 14, 1938 by the Évian Conference to negotiate additional entry quotas for Jewish refugees from Nazi Germany and Austria and to coordinate their orderly departure with the German authorities. During and after World War II, the organization was responsible for the resettlement of displaced persons.

== The Evian Conference and Jewish Entry Quotas ==
=== Formation ===
The ICR was made up of government representatives sent by most of the 32 states participating in the conference. A council of six members was informally formed from this circle, with Lord Winterton (UK), Henry Bérenger (France) and Myron Taylor (USA) prominent. Initial negotiations were entrusted to a board of directors headed by Americans George Rublee and Herbert Pell.

Six months later, Rublee resigned and was replaced by the former League of Nations High Commissioner for Refugees, the British Herbert Emerson.

=== First contacts ===
Four days before the first meeting of the ICR in London, on 3 August 1938, the British Ambassador Nevile Henderson formally asked State Secretary Ernst von Weizsäcker whether he wished to receive the leader of the negotiations. The aim of the planned discussion was to create "...an orderly basis for sending Jews abroad...". Weizsäcker rejected the negotiations and referred to the failure of the Évian Conference, which had not established any significant quotas for the reception. Germany did not want and could not give the refugees foreign currency. Requests from the US and French ambassadors were also unsuccessful.

After the Kristallnacht pogroms of November 1938, the German side changed its readiness for negotiations. Hermann Göring wanted to use all available means to promote "Jewish emigration" and ordered Reinhard Heydrich to create a Reich Central Office for Jewish Emigration in Berlin (January - February 1939). Informal confidential contacts were carried out through intermediaries. In December 1938, Hjalmar Schacht, with Adolf Hitler's consent, went to London, where he met with Rublee "as a private person."

The German authorities violated agreements, and the United States and other countries were unwilling to accept refugees, Rublee's plan was not implemented.

=== German proposals ===
At this time, the Sicherheitsdienst (SD) had also come to the realization that even under the best conditions, probably 200,000 Jews were “unfit to emigrate” due to age and illness. The costs of maintaining the Jews who remained in the Reich were to be covered, if possible, by fellow believers abroad or by confiscated property from the refugees.

Schacht presented Rublee with a more concrete plan. Within the next five years, all Jews of working age should to leave Germany. Their assets must be confiscated, and the funds used primarily to support the older Jews remaining in Germany. A quarter of the proceeds were to go into a trust fund, which could only be transferred when the foreign exchange situation was favorable. Rublee was to propose to the government representatives of the ICR that they advance foreign currency as “immigration aid” for an initial 150,000 emigrants.

On January 20, 1939, Schacht was dismissed as president of the Reichsbank. However, the very next day Rublee met with Hermann Göring, who was aware of the matter and instructed Ministerial Director Helmuth Wohlthat to continue the negotiations.

=== Reaction ===
Joachim von Ribbentrop, who felt ignored by Schacht, was against the plan, wanting to maintain his position. Reinhard Heydrich, who had been head of the Reich Central Office for Jewish Emigration since 24 January 1939, also did not want to rely on the plan. He intended to create an "Imperial Association of Jews in Germany" and, along with the international Jewish aid organizations, make it responsible for acquiring foreign currency and obtaining immigration permits. At their meeting in mid-February 1939, the government representatives of the ICR limited themselves to non-committal statements about "promoting... the possibility of permanent resettlement of 'forced migrants' from Germany" and taking the financing plans "under consideration". There were no specific commitments. Several possible host countries were mentioned, including Madagascar, as well as four commissions. However, in April, the ICR discovered that only agricultural workers and a few specialists and investors were needed; its own labor market should not be burdened under any circumstances.

While negotiations with the German authorities were ongoing, Heydrich was able to point to his success in removing almost 20,000 Jews from Germany in three months. A few months later, the outbreak of World War II thwarted the ICR’s half-baked plans.

== The Bermuda Conference and the Resettlement of Displaced Persons ==
The search for refuge proved unsuccessful, and during the early years of the war the ICR ceased its work without disbanding the organization. At the Bermuda Conference, which opened on 19 April 1943 with the participation of the United States and Great Britain to deal with the problem of war refugees, it was decided to reactivate the ICR. Although the ICR was to act as an important instrument for the urgent rescue and support of Jews (calls for help from the Warsaw Ghetto rebels were heard in the West two days after the start of the Bermuda Conference), the ICR Executive did not meet until August and did not adopt a single rescue or aid project in 1943.

In August 1943, the ICR Executive Committee recognized that the circumstances of the war required it to go beyond its original mandate and care for people who had left their homeland for religious, racial or political reasons out of fear for their lives and freedom. The relief effort, based on the division of labour, was to be organized jointly with the United Nations Relief and Rehabilitation Administration (UNRRA), which was founded the same year. The ICR was to take care of the resettlement of displaced persons who were unwilling or unable to return to their countries of origin, while UNRRA was to organize repatriation to their respective home countries.

The seventh and final plenary session of the Intergovernmental Committee on Refugees, attended by twenty-nine of its members, was held in London from May 30 to June 3, 1947. Action at the meeting included resolutions that no further activities were to be undertaken by the Committee after July 1, 1947. It was replaced by the International Refugee Organization.

== Literature ==
- Brechtken, Magnus. «Madagaskar für die Juden». Antisemitische Idee und politische Praxis 1885—1945. München: R. Oldenbourg Verlag, 1997. ISBN 3-486-56240-1. (full original text).
- Carneiro, Maria Luiza Tucci. Weltbürger. Brasilien und die Flüchtlinge des Nationalsozialismus 1933—1948 // Reihe: Geschichte, Forschung und Wissenschaft, 43. Lit, Münster: Lit, 2014.
- Enzyklopädie des Holocaust. München. Vol. 2. ISBN 3-492-22700-7.
- Jansen, Hans. Der Madagaskar-Plan. Die beabsichtigte Deportation der europäischen Juden nach Madagaskar. München, 1997. ISBN 3-7844-2605-0.
- Meinen, Insa; Meyer, Ahlrich. Verfolgt von Land zu Land: Jüdische Flüchtlinge in Westeuropa 1938—1944. Paderborn: Schöningh, 2013 ISBN 978-3-506-77564-1.
- Sjöberg, Tommie. The Powers and the Persecuted — The Refugee Problem and the Intergovernmental Committee of Refugees (IGCR), 1938—1947. Lund University Press, 1991. ISBN 91-7966-155-6.
- Vogel, Rolf (Bearb.). Ein Stempel hat gefehlt. Dokumente zur Emigration deutscher Juden. München, p. 247. 1977. ISBN 3-426-05602-X.
- Weingarten, Ralph. Die Hilfeleistung der westlichen Welt bei der Endlösung der deutschen Judenfrage. Das Intergovernmental Committee on Political Refugees (IGC) 1938—1939. Bern, 1983.

== Sources ==
- Gilbert, Martin (2006). Kristallnacht: prelude to destruction. Making history series. London: Harper Press. ISBN 978-0-00-719240-3.
