= William Alvah Rublee =

American diplomat

William Alvah Rublee (March 16, 1861 – April 15, 1910) was an American Consul General, journalist and editor.

Rublee was born in Madison, Wisconsin. Rublee's father was Horace Rublee, who was also a journalist and ambassador. The younger Rublee attended Phillips Exeter Academy, Harvard College (Class of 1883, degree in French and German) and Harvard Law School (class of 1885).

Rublee returned to Milwaukee after finishing law school, becoming the Milwaukee Journal Sentinel political editor. Eventually he became the vice president and director. Benjamin Harrison appointed him Consul General of the United States to Prague (then in Austria-Hungary) on June 6, 1890. He retired on November 9, 1893. William McKinley and Theodore Roosevelt appointed him Consul General at Hong Kong (March 2, 1901), Havana, Cuba (September 15, 1902), Vienna, Austria (March 26, 1903), and then again at Hong Kong (May 17, 1909).

Rublee died in Hong Kong at the age of 49 on April 15, 1910 of peritonitis. His remains were repatriated to Seattle, Washington on a steamer and then taken to Madison, Wisconsin for burial.

== See also ==
- George Rublee, his brother
