= Juliet Barrett Rublee =

American film producer (1875–1966)

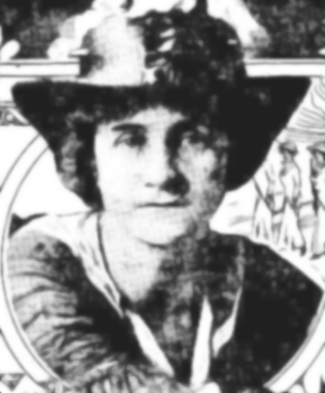
- Born: March 2, 1875; Chicago, Illinois, US
- Died: May 17, 1966 (aged 91)
- Occupations: film producer, birth control advocate
- Spouse: George Rublee (m. 1899)

Juliet Barrett Rublee (March 2, 1875 – May 17, 1966) was an American birth control advocate, suffragist, and film producer. She was married to lawyer George Rublee.

== Biography ==
Born on March 2, 1875, in Chicago, Rublee was the heir to the Barrett Company, a roofing supply and tar manufacturer. She attended Miss Porter's School.

In 1899, Juliet married George Rublee, a Wilson appointee to the Federal Trade Commission. In 1911, she served as the president of the Cornish Equal Suffrage League and worked towards women's suffrage in New Hampshire. She also participated in women's suffrage parades in New York.

Juliet Rublee was a member of the Committee of 100 which was organized in January 1917 to protest the recent arrest of birth control activists in Brownsville, Brooklyn. Other members of the Committee of 100 included Mary Ware Dennett, Rose Pastor Stokes, and Crystal Eastman. They held a protest rally at Carnegie Hall on January 28, 1917, and published a booklet titled The Birth Control Movement, highlighting Sanger's work and the positive effects of family limitation. Rublee was responsible for writing many of the materials produced by the Committee of 100.

The Committee of 100 disbanded shortly after Sanger's trial ended, but Committee members continued to support Sanger and the birth control movement. They funded the Birth Control Review, a monthly journal founded in 1917, and by lent their support to the First American Birth Control Conference, in held in 1921.

Rublee was Sanger's most significant financial backer. She helped Sanger establish herself among the wealthy and powerful in New York, Washington, and Chicago. She also paid the rent of the Birth Control Review offices.

She led a diving expedition for treasure in the Mediterranean Sea in 1925.

She produced the silent film Flame of Mexico (1932), also known as The Soul of Mexico, The Heart of Mexico and Alma Mexicana. Rublee invested $150,000 of her own money into the film. It may be the first American feature motion picture made entirely in Mexico.

Her papers are maintained by Smith College.

== Gallery ==
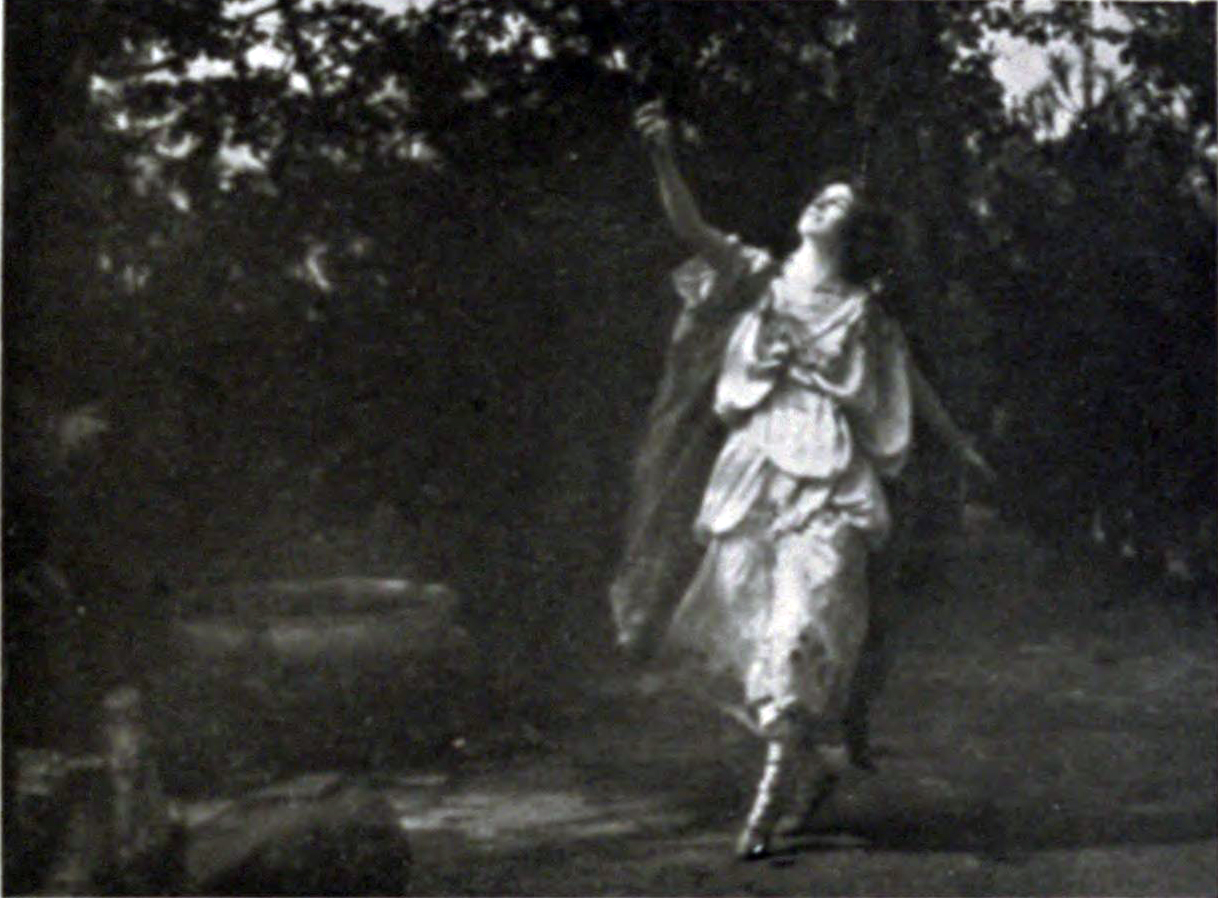
Juliet Barrett Rublee as a dancer for The Masque, 1914

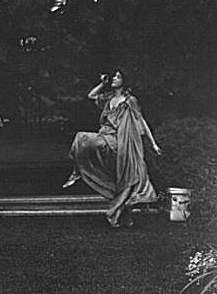
Juliet Barrett Rublee as Tacita the dryad, in a 1913 rehearsal for Sanctuary, A Bird Masque, by Percy MacKaye
