= Horace Rublee =

American journalist

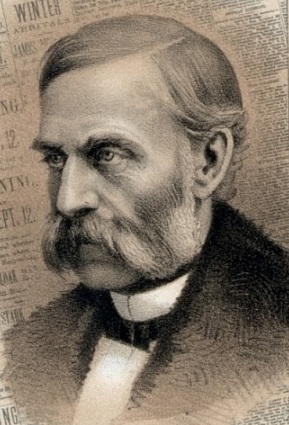
- Born: August 19, 1829; Berkshire, Vermont
- Died: October 19, 1896 (aged 67); Milwaukee, Wisconsin
- Occupations: Journalist, Editor, Republican party leader, Ambassador to Switzerland

Horace Rublee (August 19, 1829 – October 19, 1896) was a Wisconsin journalist and newspaper editor, Republican party leader, and ambassador to Switzerland.

Rublee was born August 19, 1829, the son of Alvah and Martha (Kent) Rublee, in Berkshire, Vermont, a community on the Canada–US border. In 1839, his father moved to what was then the pioneer western town of Sheboygan, Wisconsin Territory, where he had an interest at a saw mill, and in June 1840 the rest of the family joined him, traveling via steamship to Milwaukee and by sloop from Milwaukee to Sheboygan.

The Rublee family was among the earliest of young families from New York and New England who settled in Sheboygan County. This new community was intellectually vibrant. Influential were, for example, Horace Greeley and the New York Tribune, which was subscribed to by many in the area, and Combe on the Constitution of Man. There was a debating society well attended by these pioneers in nearby Sheboygan Falls, and among the philosophical trends was Fourierism. In 1843 a school opened, and Rublee was one of the first two students. The teacher frequented the debating societies in Sheboygan Falls, and "he loaned me Scott's 'Lady of the Lake,' 'Nicholas Nickleby,' 'Oliver Twist' and several of Bulwer's novels, which helped to pass the school hours, and wonderfully shortened the long winter evenings." Rublee was academically stimulated, with many influences of high literature. As a young man, he aspired to be a poet.

He taught school briefly at age 17. Starting in 1849 he spent a year at the University of Wisconsin–Madison, then returned to Sheboygan County to teach for two more years.

Rublee began his political and journalism career in 1852, when he moved back to Madison. He was legislative reporter for the Madison Argus and Democrat in 1852–53. In 1853 he started work at the Wisconsin State Journal, and in 1854 purchased a part interest in the paper. He was secretary of the state mass meeting held at Madison on July 13, 1854, which formed the state chapter of the Republican party. The party had been started in embryonic form in March in Ripon, but this mass meeting was the first serious establishment of the party as a lasting organized political force. He was Republican party chair 1859–1869, and in 1868 a delegate to the national Republican convention. From 1856 to 1858 he was Wisconsin State Librarian. From 1857 to 1871 he was a curator of State Historical Society of Wisconsin, serving with such notable nineteenth-century Wisconsin figures as James Duane Doty, Cyrus Woodman and Lyman Draper. He married Katherine Hopkins in 1857.

In 1869 Rublee was a candidate for the US Senate, although this was prior to the Seventeenth Amendment (the direct election of Senators), so while the candidacy and campaign were not a secret from the public, it was carried out almost entirely behind closed doors. The seat was won by Matthew H. Carpenter. Later that same year, Rublee was appointed Ambassador to Switzerland by President Ulysses S. Grant, serving until 1877. In consequence of this appointment, he sold his interest in the Wisconsin State Journal.

When he returned to Wisconsin after his ambassadorship, he again assumed the chair position of the Republican party, serving from 1877 to 1879. In 1878 he settled the 'Greenback Party Controversy' which threatened to seriously divide the party. In 1879 he went east and served as editor of Boston Advertiser for one year.

After he returned to Wisconsin, in 1881 he and associates purchased the Milwaukee Daily News and renamed it Republican and News. In 1882 he purchased the Milwaukee Sentinel and merged the Republican News into it. He remained the editor of Sentinel until his death in 1896. During his life in Milwaukee, he lived on fashionable Prospect Avenue, home of the cream of Milwaukee's social, political and business elite. He died October 19, 1896, in Milwaukee.

== See also ==
- Edward Bulwer-Lytton
- Sir Walter Scott
  - "The Lady of the Lake"
- Charles Dickens
  - Nicholas Nickleby
  - Oliver Twist
- George Rublee
- William Alvah Rublee
