= Évian Conference =

Conference addressing a Jewish refugee crisis

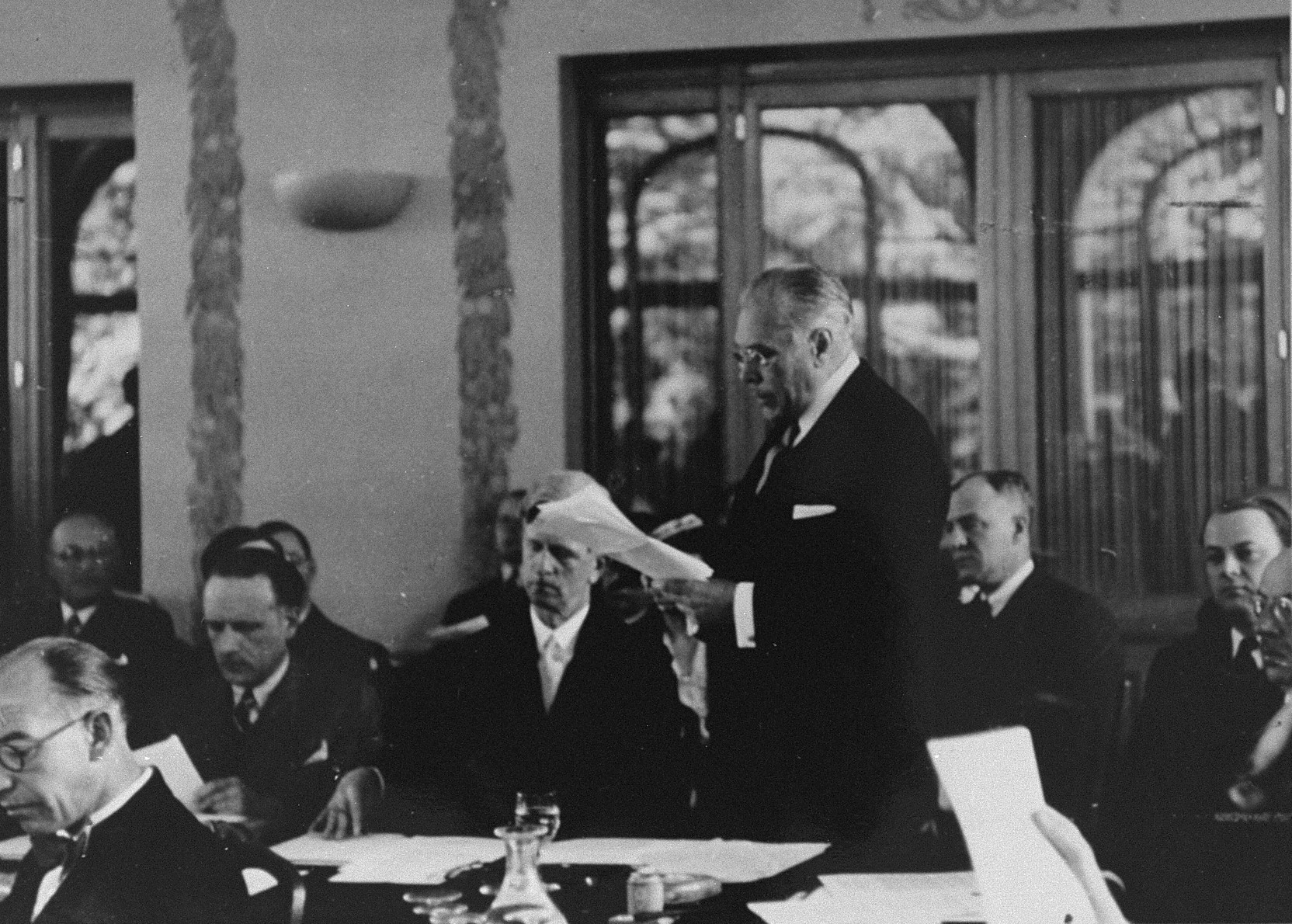
Myron Taylor addresses the Évian Conference

The Évian Conference was convened 6–15 July 1938 at Évian-les-Bains, France, to address the problem of German and Austrian Jewish refugees wishing to flee persecution by Nazi Germany. It was the initiative of United States President Franklin D. Roosevelt who perhaps hoped to obtain commitments from some of the invited nations to accept more refugees, although he took pains to avoid stating that objective expressly. Historians have suggested that Roosevelt desired to deflect attention and criticism from American policy that severely limited the quota of refugees admitted to the United States.

The conference was attended by representatives from 32 countries, and 24 voluntary organizations also attended as observers, presenting plans either orally or in writing. Golda Meir, the attendee from British Mandatory Palestine, was not permitted to speak or to participate in the proceedings except as an observer. Some 200 international journalists gathered at Évian to observe and report on the meeting. The Soviet Union refused to take part in the conference, though direct talks on resettlement of Jews and Slavs between German and Soviet governments proceeded at the time of the conference and after it. In the end, the Soviet Union refused to accept refugees and a year later ordered its border guards to treat all refugees attempting to cross into Soviet territory as spies.

The conference was ultimately doomed, as aside from the Dominican Republic and later Costa Rica, delegations from the 32 participating nations failed to come to any agreement about accepting Jewish refugees fleeing the Third Reich. The conference thus inadvertently proved to be a useful tool for Nazi propaganda. Adolf Hitler responded to the news of the conference by saying that if other nations agreed to take the Jews, he would help them leave.

== Background ==
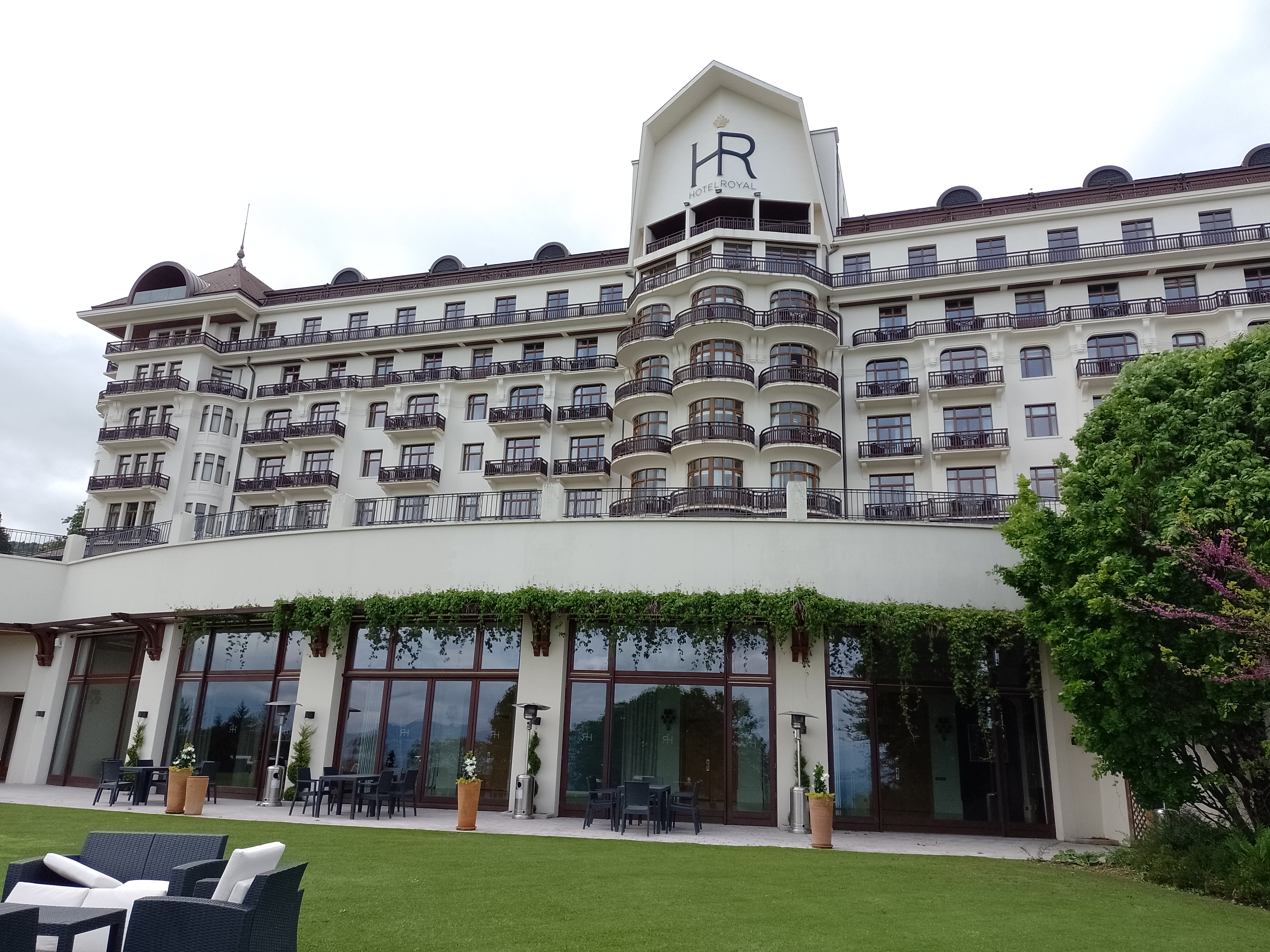
Hôtel Royal (Évian-les-Bains) in Évian-les-Bains, where the conference took place (pictured 2023)

The Nuremberg Laws stripped German Jews, who were already persecuted by the Hitler regime, of their German citizenship. They were classified as "subjects" and became stateless in their own country. When Hitler annexed Austria in March 1938, and applied German racial laws, the 200,000 Jews of Austria became stateless.

Hitler's expansion was accompanied by a rise in antisemitism and fascism across Europe. Antisemitic governments came to power in Hungary and Romania, where Jews had always been second-class citizens. The result was millions of Jews attempting to flee Europe, while they were perceived as an undesirable and socially damaging population with popular academic theories arguing that Jews damaged the "racial hygiene" or "eugenics" of nations where they were resident and engaged in conspirative behaviour. In 1936, Chaim Weizmann (who decided not to attend the conference) declared that "the world seemed to be divided into two parts – those places where the Jews could not live and those where they could not enter."

Before the Conference the United States and Britain made a critical agreement: the British promised not to bring up the fact that the United States was not filling its immigration quotas, and any mention of Palestine as a possible destination for Jewish refugees was excluded from the agenda. Britain administered Palestine under the terms of the Mandate for Palestine.

== Proceedings ==
Conference delegates expressed sympathy for Jews under Nazism but made no immediate joint resolution or commitment, portraying the conference as a mere beginning, to the frustration of some commentators. Noting "that the involuntary emigration of people in large numbers has become so great that it renders racial and religious problems more acute, increases international unrest, and may hinder seriously the processes of appeasement in international relations", the Évian Conference established the Intergovernmental Committee on Refugees (ICR) with the purpose to "approach the governments of the countries of refuge with a view to developing opportunities for permanent settlement." The ICR received little authority or support from its member nations and fell into inaction.

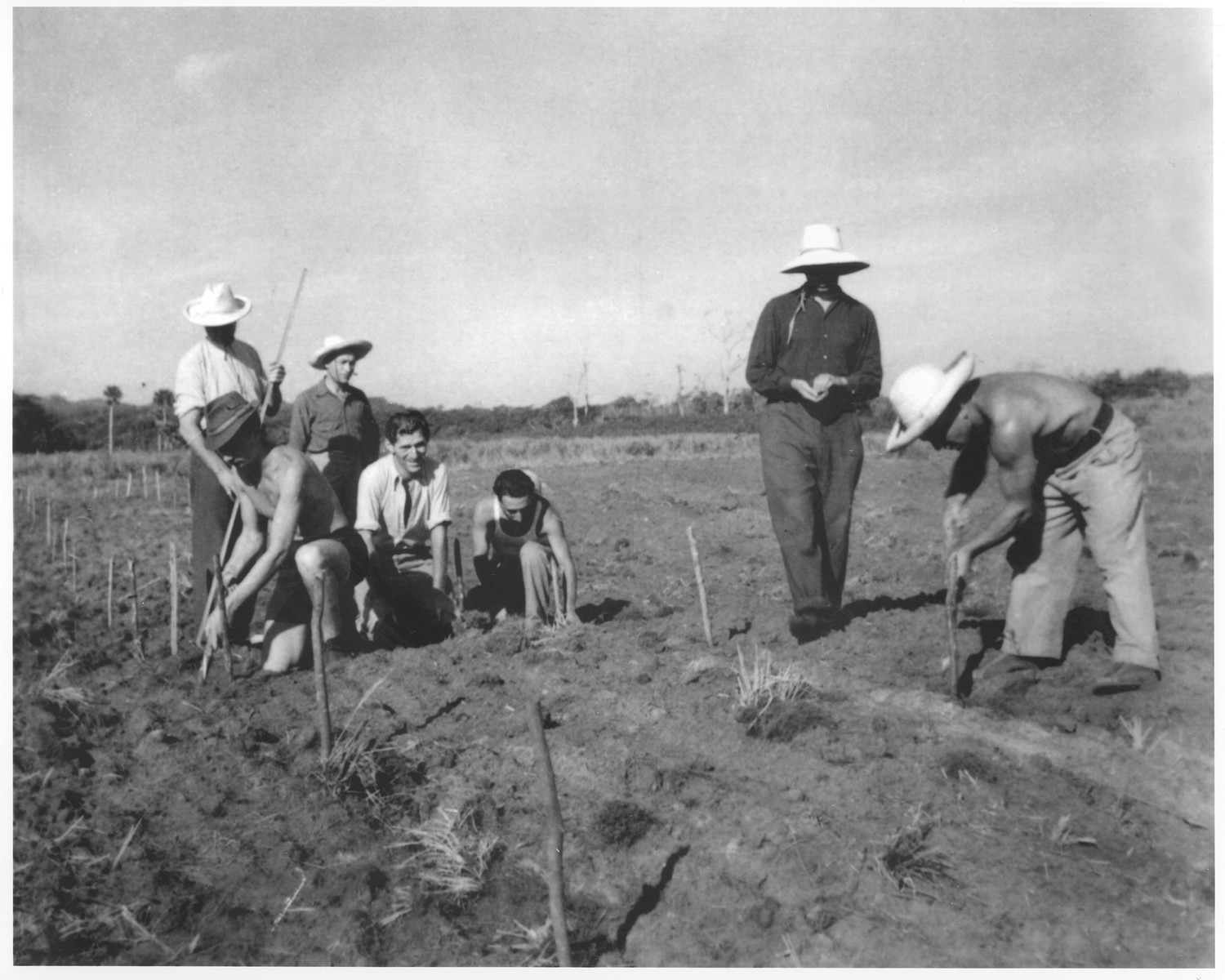
Jewish refugees work in the fields in Sosúa, Dominican Republic

The United States sent no government official to the conference. Instead Roosevelt's friend, the American businessman Myron C. Taylor, represented the U.S. with James G. McDonald as his advisor. The U.S. agreed that the German and Austrian immigration quota of 30,000 a year would be made available to Jewish refugees. In the three years 1938 to 1940 the US actually exceeded this quota by 10,000. During the same period Britain accepted almost the same number of German Jews. Australia agreed to take 15,000 over three years, with South Africa taking only those with close relatives already resident; Canada refused to make any commitment and only accepted a few refugees over this period. The Australian delegate T. W. White noted: "as we have no real racial problem, we are not desirous of importing one". The French delegate stated that France had reached "the extreme point of saturation as regards admission of refugees", a sentiment repeated by most other representatives. The only countries willing to accept a large number of Jews were the Dominican Republic, which offered to accept up to 100,000 refugees on generous terms, and later Costa Rica. In 1940 an agreement was signed and Rafael Trujillo donated 11,000 hectares (26,000 acres) of his properties near the town of Sosúa, Dominican Republic for settlements. Trujillo, whose racism preferred European Jews over Afro-Caribbeans, did this because he was "desperately anxious to introduce a leavening of white immigration stock . . . Trujillo strongly believed in white superiority." The first settlers arrived in May 1940: only about 800 settlers came to Sosúa, and most later moved on to the United States.

Disagreements among the numerous Jewish organisations on how to handle the refugee crisis added to the confusion. Concerned that Jewish organisations would be seen trying to promote greater immigration into the United States, executive secretary to the American Jewish Committee, Morris D. Waldman, privately warned against Jewish representatives highlighting the problems Jewish refugees faced. Samuel Rosenman sent President Franklin D. Roosevelt a memorandum stating that an "increase of quotas is wholly inadvisable as it would merely produce a 'Jewish problem' in the countries increasing the quota." According to the Jewish Telegraphic Agency, during the discussions, five leading Jewish organisations sent a joint memorandum discouraging mass Jewish emigration from central Europe. Reacting to the conferences' failure, the AJC declined to directly criticise American policy, while Jonah Wise blamed the British government and praised "American generosity".

Yoav Gelber concluded that "if the conference were to lead to a mass emigration to places other than Palestine, the Zionist leaders were not particularly interested in its work." Years later, while noting that American and British Jewish leaders were "very helpful to our work behind the scenes, [but] were not notably enthusiastic about it in public", Edward Turnour who led the British delegation recalled the "stubbornly unrealistic approach" of some leading Zionists who insisted on Palestine as the only option for the refugees.

== Consequences ==
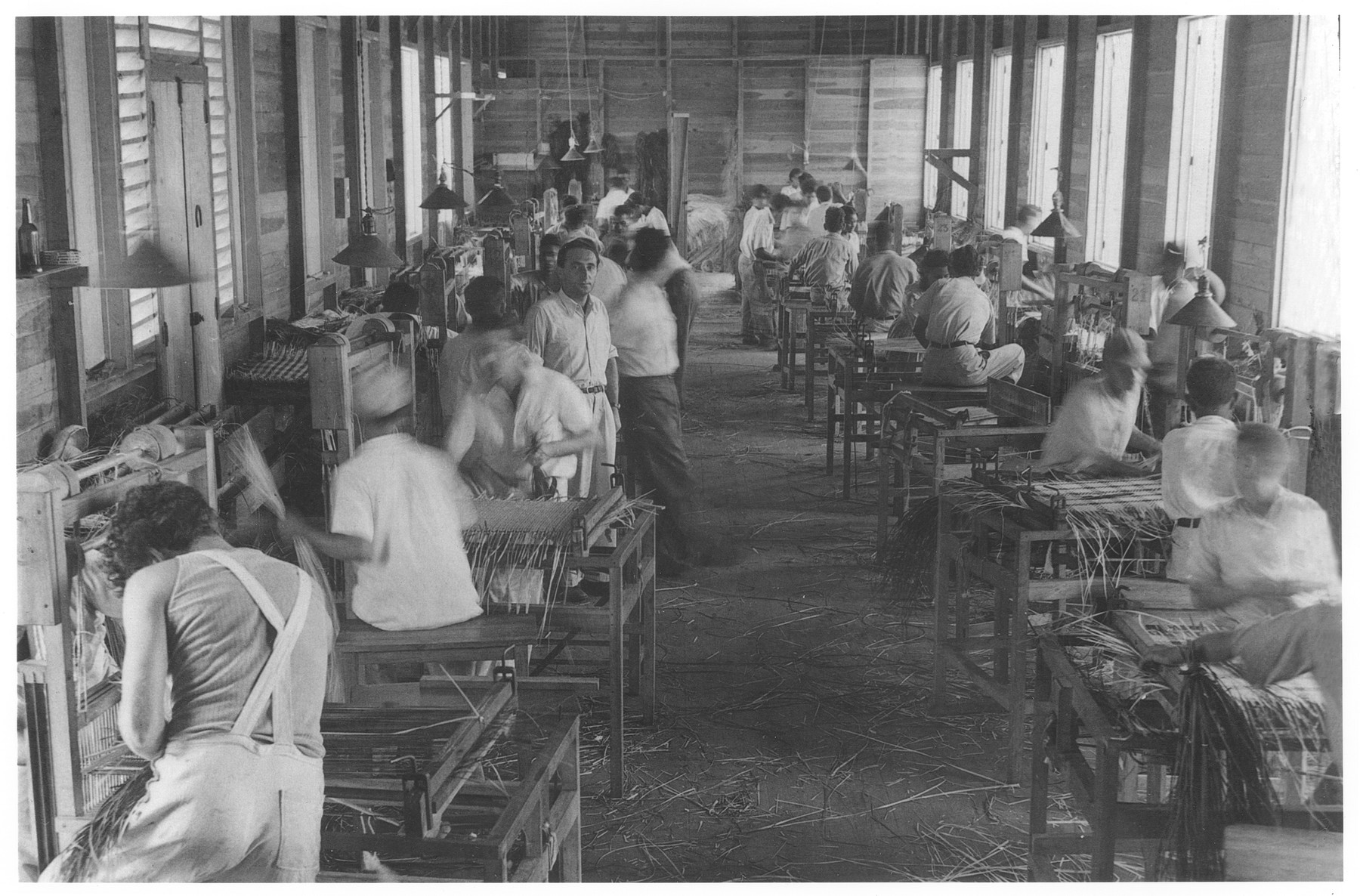
Jewish refugees in Sosúa, Dominican Republic work in a straw factory making handbags for export to the United States.

The result of the failure of the conference was that many of the Jews had no escape and so were ultimately subject to what was known as Hitler's "Final Solution to the Jewish Question". Two months after Évian, in September 1938, Britain and France granted Hitler the right to occupy the Sudetenland of Czechoslovakia. In November 1938, on Kristallnacht, a massive pogrom across the Third Reich was accompanied by the destruction of over 1,000 synagogues, massacres and the mass arrests of tens of thousands of Jews. In March 1939, Hitler occupied more of Czechoslovakia, causing a further 180,000 Jews to fall under Axis control, while in May 1939 the British issued the White Paper which barred Jews from entering Palestine or buying land there. Following their occupation of Poland in late 1939 and invasion of Soviet Union in 1941, the Nazis embarked on a program of systematically killing all Jews in Europe.

== Reaction ==
German dictator Adolf Hitler said in response to the conference:

I can only hope and expect that the other world, which has such deep sympathy for these criminals [Jews], will at least be generous enough to convert this sympathy into practical aid. We, on our part, are ready to put all these criminals at the disposal of these countries, for all I care, even on luxury ships.

In her autobiography My Life (1975), Golda Meir described her outrage being in "the ludicrous capacity of the [Jewish] observer from Palestine, not even seated with the delegates, although the refugees under discussion were my own people..." After the conference Meir told the press: "There is only one thing I hope to see before I die and that is that my people should not need expressions of sympathy anymore."

In July 1979, Walter Mondale described the hope represented by the Evian conference:

At stake at Evian were both human lives – and the decency and self-respect of the civilized world. If each nation at Evian had agreed on that day to take in 17,000 Jews at once, every Jew in the Reich could have been saved. As one American observer wrote, 'It is heartbreaking to think of the ... desperate human beings ... waiting in suspense for what happens at Evian. But the question they underline is not simply humanitarian ... it is a test of civilization.'"

== Participants ==
=== National delegations ===
Country	Delegation
Argentina	Dr Tomas A. Le Breton, Ambassador in France; Carlos A. Pardo, Secretary-General of the Permanent Delegation to the League of Nations
Australia	Lieutenant-Colonel Thomas W. White, DFC, VD, MP, Minister for Trade and Customs; Alfred Thorpe Stirling, Australian liaison officer in the Foreign Office, London; A. W. Stuart-Smith, Australia House, London
Belgium	Robert de Foy, Chief of the Belgian State Security Service; J. Schneider, Director in the Ministry of Foreign Affairs and Foreign Trade
Bolivia	Simón Iturri Patiño, Minister in France, the Bolivian "Tin King"; Adolfo Costa du Rels, Permanent Delegate to the League of Nations
Brazil	Hélio Lobo, Minister first class, Member of the Brazilian Academy of Letters; Expert: Jorge Olinto de Oliveira, Permanent Delegate, First Secretary of the Brazilian Legation
Canada	Humphrey Hume Wrong, Permanent Delegate to the League of Nations; Expert: W. R. Little, Commissioner for European Emigration in London
Chile	Fernando García Oldini, Minister in Switzerland and Representative at the International Labour Organization, with the rank of Envoy Extraordinary and Minister Plenipotentiary
Colombia	Luis Cano, Permanent Delegate to the League of Nations, with the rank of Envoy Extraordinary and Minister Plenipotentiary; Prof. J. M. Yepes, Legal Adviser to the Permanent Delegation to the League of Nations, with the rank of Envoy Extraordinary and Minister Plenipotentiary; Abelardo Forero Benavides, Secretary to the Permanent Delegation to the League of Nations
Costa Rica	Prof. Luís Dobles Segreda, Chargé d'Affaires in Paris
Cuba	Dr. Juan Antiga Escobar, Envoy Extraordinary and Minister Plenipotentiary in Switzerland, permanent Delegate to the League of Nations
Denmark	Gustav Rasmussen, of the Ministry of Foreign Affairs; Troels Hoff, of the Ministry of Justice
Dominican Republic	Virgilio Trujillo Molina, Envoy Extraordinary and Minister Plenipotentiary in France and Belgium, brother of the dictator Rafael Leónidas Trujillo; Dr. Salvador E. Paradas, Chargé d'Affaires, representing the Permanent Delegation to the League of Nations
Ecuador	Alejandro Gastelu Concha, Secretary of the Permanent Delegation to the League of Nations, Consul-General in Geneva
France	Henry Bérenger, Ambassador; Bressy, Minister Plenipotentiary, deputy director of the International Unions at the Ministry of Foreign Affairs; Combes, Director in the Ministry of the Interior; Georges Coulon, of the Foreign Ministry; Fourcade, Head of department in the Ministry of the Interior; François Seydoux, official of the Bureau for European Affairs in the Foreign Ministry; Baron Brincard, official of the Bureau for League of Nations Affairs in the Foreign Ministry
Guatemala	José Gregorio Diaz, Envoy Extraordinary and Minister Plenipotentiary in France
Haiti	Léon R. Thébaud, Commercial Attaché in Paris, with the rank of Minister
Honduras	Mauricio Rosal, Consul in Paris, with the rank of Envoy Extraordinary and Minister Plenipotentiary
Ireland	Francis Thomas Cremins, Permanent Delegate to the League of Nations; John Duff, Assistant Secretary in the Ministry of Justice; William Maguire, Second Assistant Secretary in the Ministry of Industry and Commerce
Mexico	Primo Villa Michel, Envoy Extraordinary and Minister Plenipotentiary in the Netherlands; Manuel Tello Barraud, Chargé d'Affaires representing the Permanent Delegation to the League of Nations
Netherlands	W. C. Beucker Andreae, Head of the Legal Department in the Ministry of Foreign Affairs; R. A. Verwey, Director of the State Insurance Office for the Unemployed in the Ministry of Social Welfare; I. P. Hooykaas, Adviser in the Ministry of Justice
New Zealand	C. B. Burdekin, OBE, from the New Zealand High Commissioner's Office in London
Nicaragua	Constantino Herdocia, minister in Great Britain and France, with the rank of Envoy Extraordinary and Minister Plenipotentiary
Norway	Michael Hansson, President of the Nansen International Office for Refugees, which received the Nobel Peace Prize later the same year; Carl Platou, Director-General in the Ministry of Justice; Finn Moe, journalist, representative of the private organizations for refugees in Norway; Adviser: R. Konstad, Director of the Norwegian Central Passport Office
Panama	Dr. Ernesto Hoffmann, Consul-General in Geneva and Permanent Delegate to the League of Nations, with the rank of Envoy Extraordinary and Minister Plenipotentiary
Paraguay	Gustavo A. Wiengreen, Envoy Extraordinary and Minister Plenipotentiary in Hungary
Peru	Francisco García Calderón Rey, Minister in France, with the rank of Envoy Extraordinary and Minister Plenipotentiary
Sweden	Gösta Engzell, Head of the Legal Department in the Ministry for Foreign Affairs; Magnus Hallenborg, Director in the Legal Department in the Ministry for Foreign Affairs; Secretary of the Delegation; E. G. Drougge, Secretary at the National Board of Health and Welfare
Switzerland	Dr. Heinrich Rothmund, Head of the Police Division of the Federal Department of Justice and Police; Henri Werner, Lawyer, Police Division of the Federal Department of Justice and Police
United Kingdom	Edward Turnour, 6th Earl Winterton, MP, Chancellor of the Duchy of Lancaster; Sir Michael Palairet, KCMG, Minister Plenipotentiary; Advisers: Sir John Shuckburgh, KCMG, CB, Under-Secretary of State at the Colonial Office; J. G. Hibbert, MC, Director at the Colonial Office; E. N. Cooper, OBE, Director at the Home Office; R. M. Makins, Assistant Adviser on League of Nations Questions in the Foreign Office, secretary of the delegation; Secretaries to Earl Winterton: Captain Victor Cazalet, MP; T. B. Williamson, Home Office
United States	Myron Charles Taylor, Ambassador on Special Mission; Adviser: James Grover McDonald, President of the "President Roosevelt Consultative Committee for Political Refugees", formerly League of Nations High Commissioner for Refugees Coming from Germany (1933–1935); Technical Advisers: Robert T. Pell, Division of European Affairs, State Department; George L. Brandt, formerly head of the Visa Division in the State Department; Secretary of the Delegation: Hayward G. Hill, Consul in Geneva; Assistant to James McDonald: George L. Warren, Executive Secretary of the "President Roosevelt Consultive Committee for Political Refugees"
Uruguay	Dr. Alfredo Carbonell Debali, Delegate Plenipotentiary
Venezuela	Carlos Aristimuño Coll, Envoy Extraordinary and Minister Plenipotentiary in France

=== Other delegations and observers ===
Organization	Representatives
High Commission for Refugees from Germany	Sir Neill Malcolm, KCB, DSO; Frederick Ponsonby, Viscount Duncannon, secretary to Sir Neill Malcolm; Tevfik Erim, member of the Political Section of the Secretariat of the League of Nations, father of Kenan Erim
General Secretariat of the Intergovernmental Committee	Jean Paul-Boncour, Secretary-General; Gabrielle Boisseau, Assistant to the Secretary-General; J. Herbert, interpreter; Edward Archibald Lloyd, interpreter; Louis Constant E. Muller, translator; William David McAfee, translator; Mézières, treasurer
Hungary	Imre Békessy, father of János Békessy, news agent; János Békessy, news agent of the Prager Tagblatt, he wrote down the event in his book Die Mission; Endre Sós, Jewish community functionary as Miklós Horthy's unofficial observer

=== Private organizations ===
- Agudas Israel World Organization, London
- Alliance Israélite Universelle, Paris
- American, British, Belgian, French, Dutch, and Swiss Catholic Committees for Aid to Refugees
- American Joint Distribution Committee, Paris
- Association de colonisation juive, Paris
- Association of German Scholars in Distress Abroad, London
- Bureau international pour le respect du droit d'asyle et l'aide aux réfugiés politiques, Paris
- Central Bureau for the Settlement of German Jews, London
- Central Committee for Refugees from Germany, Prague
- Centre de recherches de solutions au problème juif, Paris
- Comité d'aide et d'assistance aux victimes de l'anti-semitisme en Allemagne, Brussels
- Comite for Bijzondere Joodsche Belangen, Amsterdam
- Comité international pour le placement des intellectuels réfugiés, Geneva
- Comité pour la défense des droits des Israélites en Europe centrale et orientale, Paris
- Committee of Aid for German Jews, London
- Council for German Jewry, London
- Emigration Advisory Committee, London
- Fédération des émigrés d'Autriche, Paris
- Fédération internationale des émigrés d'Allemagne, Paris
- Freeland Association, London
- German Committee of the Quaker Society of Friends, London
- HICEM, Paris
- International Christian Committee for Non-Aryans, London
- Internationale ouvrière et socialiste, Paris and Brussels
- Jewish Agency for Palestine, London
- The Joint Foreign Committee of the Board of Deputies of British Jews and the Anglo-Jewish Association, London
- Komitee für die Entwicklung der grossen jüdischen Kolonisation, Zürich
- League of Nations Union, London
- New Zionist Organization, London
- ORT, Paris
- Royal Institute of International Affairs, London
- Schweizer Hilfszentrum für Flüchtlinge, Basel
- Service international de migration, Geneva
- Service universitaire international, Geneva
- Société d'émigration et de colonisation juive Emcol, Paris
- Society for the Protection of Sciences and Studies, London
- Union des Sociétés OSE, Paris
- World Jewish Congress, Paris

=== Press ===
The international press was represented by about two hundred journalists, chiefly the League of Nations correspondents of the leading daily and weekly newspapers and news agencies.

== See also ==
- Bermuda Conference
- Kimberley Plan
- White Paper of 1939
- SS St. Louis
- The Holocaust
- International response to the Holocaust
