= Bermuda Conference =

World War II conference

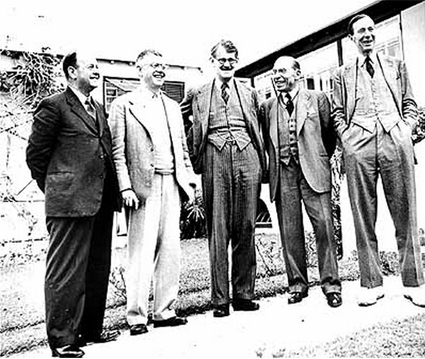
Bermuda conference

The Bermuda Conference was an international conference between the United Kingdom and the United States held from April 19 to 30, 1943, at Hamilton, Bermuda. The topic of discussion was the question of Jewish refugees who had been liberated by Allied forces and those who still remained in Nazi-occupied Europe. The only agreement reached was that the war must be won against the Nazis. US immigration quotas were not raised, and the British prohibition on Jewish refugees seeking refuge in Mandatory Palestine was not lifted.

The American delegation was led by Dr. Harold W. Dodds. The British delegation was led by Richard Law, a junior minister at the Foreign Office.

== Reaction ==
An article in The New York Times dated April 30, 1943, "Hopeful Hint Ends Bermuda Sessions", stated that the delegates had rejected recommendations that were not capable of being accomplished under war conditions and that would most likely delay the war effort.

A week later, the Zionist Committee for a Jewish Army ran an advertisement in The New York Times condemning the efforts at Bermuda as a mockery of past promises to the Jewish people and of Jewish suffering under German Nazi occupation. US Senator Harry S. Truman withdrew his membership from the committee over what was perceived as an insult to members of the US Senate, which had been involved in the conference.

Szmul Zygielbojm, a member of the Jewish advisory body to the Polish government-in-exile, committed suicide in protest at the outcome of the conference.

== See also ==
- Évian Conference in 1938
- International response to the Holocaust
- Jewish refugees from German-occupied Europe in the United Kingdom
