= Helmuth Wohlthat =

German civil servant and diplomat

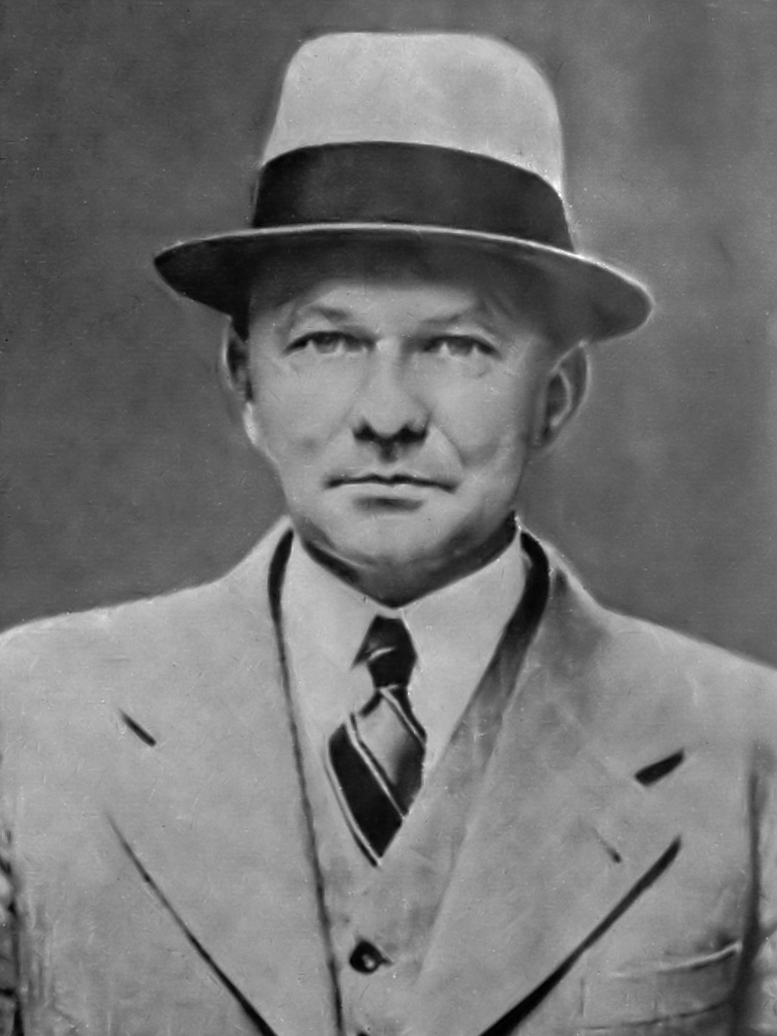
- Wohlthat in 1940

Chief, German Economic Mission to the Far East
- In office 3 April 1941 – 7 May 1945

Ministerial Director Four Year Plan
- In office 4 February 1938 – 7 May 1945

Ministerial Director Reich Ministry of Economics
- In office 22 December 1934 – 4 February 1938

Additional positions
- 1939–1945: Member of the Prussian State Council

Personal details
- Born: 4 October 1893 Wismar, Grand Duchy of Mecklenburg-Schwerin, German Empire
- Died: 1982 (age 89) West Germany
- Resting place: Friedhof II der Jerusalems-und Neuen Kirche, Kreuzberg, Berlin
- Party: Nazi Party
- Education: University of Cologne; Columbia University
- Profession: civil servant

Military service
- Allegiance: German Empire
- Branch/service: Imperial German Army
- Years of service: 1912–1918
- Rank: Oberleutnant
- Unit: 23rd (2nd Rhenish) Field Artillery Regiment
- Battles/wars: World War I

Helmuth C. H. Wohlthat (4 October 1893 – 1982) was a German businessman and civil servant in Nazi Germany. From 1938, he was a chief aide to Hermann Göring in the Four Year Plan organization, and headed several high-level diplomatic and economic negotiations before and during the Second World War.

== Early life and education ==
Wohlthat was born in 1893 at Wismar and attended the Realgymnasium in Düsseldorf and Berlin. In 1912, he enlisted in the 23rd (2nd Rhenish) Field Artillery Regiment in Koblenz as a Fahnenjunker (officer cadet). In the First World War, he served as an artillery officer and adjutant of the 16th Artillery Brigade, attaining the rank of Oberleutnant. After the end of the war and his discharge from military service, he worked as a commercial trainee and also studied at the University of Cologne. He emigrated to the United States in 1919 and continued his studies in political science at Columbia University. From 1919 to 1933 he worked in New York City as a businessman and trader.

== Return to Germany and civil service career ==
After his return to Germany in 1932, he entered the civil service and worked briefly in the Reich Ministry of Food and Agriculture in the Reich Office of Dairy Products, Oils and Fats. Hjalmar Schacht brought him into the Reich Ministry of Economics and the Prussian Ministry of Economics and Labor in 1934 as a Generalreferent (General Consultant). By December 1934, he had been promoted to Ministerial Director, and in 1935 he became the head of the Reich Office for Foreign Exchange Management. In 1937, he served as the German representative to the London conference that resulted in the 1937 International Agreement for the Regulation of Whaling. On 4 February 1938, when the Ministry of Economics was reorganized under Walther Funk, Wohlthat was named Ministerial Director for Special Projects in Hermann Göring's Four-Year Plan, reporting directly to Göring. At the same time, Göring appointed him to the Prussian State Council.

In his new post, Wohlthat was primarily responsible for foreign trade and foreign exchange management. He also was involved directly in Göring's quest to expropriate Jewish businesses under the policy of Aryanization. Over several months in 1938 he investigated and ultimately exposed the Petschek mining conglomerate to be a Jewish-owned business, despite it being technically controlled by a foreign holding company, and it was ultimately confiscated by government trustees for disposal.

Wohlthat's remit also involved oversight of the German whaling fleet, and he was tasked with planning and preparing for the Antarctic Expedition of 1938-1939. The expedition's main objective was economic, in particular the establishment of a whaling station and the acquisition of fishing grounds for a German whaling fleet to reduce Germany's dependence on imported industrial oils and dietary fats. Preparations took place under strict secrecy, as the enterprise was also tasked with making a feasibility assessment for a future occupation of Antarctic territory. It even resulted in a disputed German territorial claim named New Swabia. The Wohlthat Mountains in Antarctica are named after him.

== Diplomatic and trade missions ==
At this point in his career, Wohlthat embarked on a series of high-level foreign negotiations. In February 1939, he negotiated the Rublee-Wohlthat-Plan with George Rublee, U.S. President Franklin Roosevelt's representative to the Intergovernmental Committee on Refugees. The agreement set out conditions and a funding mechanism (via a trust fund financed by Jewish assets) for the emigration of 150,000 working-age Jews from Germany over a period of 3 to 5 years, to be followed by 250,000 of their dependents. The agreement was never implemented due to the outbreak of the Second World War in September 1939.

Wohlthat's next assignment was as the lead negotiator for the economic treaty with the Kingdom of Romania that was signed on 23 March 1939. By its provisions, Romania agreed to sell 90% of its oil, timber, grains and mineral ores to Germany. This was intended to relieve the Reich's scarcity of food and raw materials. Also, Germany gained the rights to develop additional Romanian oil fields, and was granted lease-free ports on the Danube and Black Sea. All these actions were aimed at securing Romania as a dependent ally in a prelude to the launching of the war. An analysis by Time magazine concluded that the treaty:

… converted Rumania from an independent nation to a German dependency. In no instance of modern times has one State made such humiliating, far-reaching economic concessions to another as Rumania's King Carol II made in Bucharest last week to Dr. Helmuth Wohlthat, Führer Hitler's traveling salesman.

In July 1939, Wohlthat was in London for a whaling conference. Horace Wilson, a senior official of Neville Chamberlain' s government, invited Wohlthat to Anglo-German talks in which Wilson presented a memorandum outlining a possible agreement between the United Kingdom and Nazi Germany. The paper proposed a joint declaration to abstain from aggression, arms limits, and economic cooperation. As Wohlthat left he reported Wilson as saying that "he saw the possibility of a common foreign and trade policy for the two greatest European states". Feeling himself too junior an official for such matters, Wohlthat reported to his superiors and asked what should be the reply. No reply has been found to that question.

Wohlthat's negotiations with Francisco Franco's government in Spain did not yield quite as favorable an outcome. After recently emerging victorious in the Spanish Civil War with the military help of Germany, Spain owed the Reich a great monetary debt totaling approximately $215 million. Germany was anxious to tie Spanish trade to Germany's future war needs by securing a near monopoly on Spanish trade as had been achieved with Romania. Germany intended for the Spanish debt to be repaid through yearly export surpluses. Wohlthat's first negotiating session from 12 June to 5 July yielded no results and when he returned in November, war had already been declared. Franco knew that he would likely face a boycott from the United Kingdom if he tied himself too closely to Germany and he sought to preserve his freedom of action, having already declared Spain's neutrality at the outbreak of hostilities. Negotiations resumed on 2 November and concluded with an agreement signed on 22 December. It continued the existing trade agreements between Spain and Germany but granted no special trade status and acknowledged Spain's freedom to trade with other nations; Spain subsequently concluded trade agreements with the U.K. and France. Despite initially not attaining all his objectives, Wohlthat's trade agreement eventually bore fruit when, after Germany's successes in the Battle of France, Spain tilted in favor of the Axis powers. Spanish exports to Germany increased quite dramatically. From 1940 to 1941, their value increased ten-fold, with food exports increasing fifteen times. While food products flowed to Germany and Italy, the Spanish people "starved and endured great suffering".

After the conquest and occupation of the Netherlands, Wohlthat became the Reichskommissar for the De Nederlandsche Bank in Amsterdam on 23 May 1940. In this position he controlled the Dutch foreign exchange flow and their entire foreign trade. In early April 1941, he was made the head of the German Economic Mission to the Far East and was sent to Japan. He was charged with purchasing needed raw materials such as rubber, soy beans, tin and tungsten ore. Before the closure of the Trans-Siberian Railway to German commerce by the German attack on the Soviet Union in June 1941, Wohlthat was shipping 55,000 tons of cargo per month via that route. After that, he succeeded in shipping a total of about 240,000 tons of material to Germany via freighters and submarines between 1942 and 1945, though perhaps as much as half never reached its destination due to the Allied blockade. Wohlthat remained in Japan through the end of the war.

In the post-war period, Wohlthat returned to Germany and held various supervisory board positions in the private sector. From 1947 to 1973, he was an industrial consultant in Düsseldorf at the Henkel chemical company. On 10 September 1954, Wohlthat was nominated as executive director for the Federal Republic of Germany at the World Bank by Finance Minister Fritz Schäffer and seconded by Franz Josef Strauss, a minister for special affairs, while Economics Minister Ludwig Erhard favored Otto Donner. In the vote, the majority of the Second Adenauer cabinet chose Wohlthat, but due to the intervention of Chancellor Konrad Adenauer, Donner received the post. Wohlthat died in 1982.

== Honors ==
The Wohlthat Mountains in Antarctica are named after Helmuth Wohlthat.
