= George Rublee =

American lawyer (1868–1957)

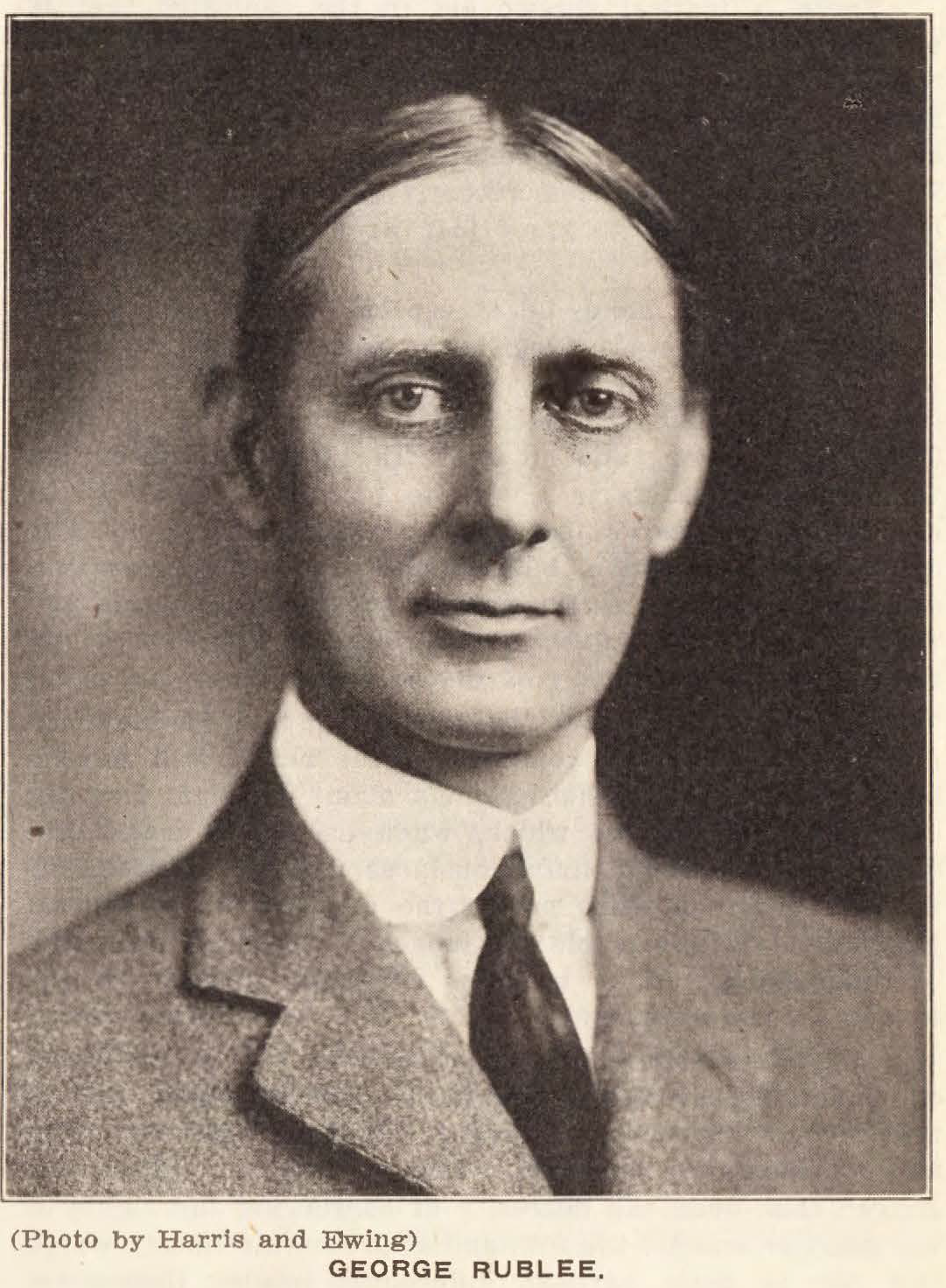
Portrait of George Rublee upon his appointment to the Federal Trade Commission

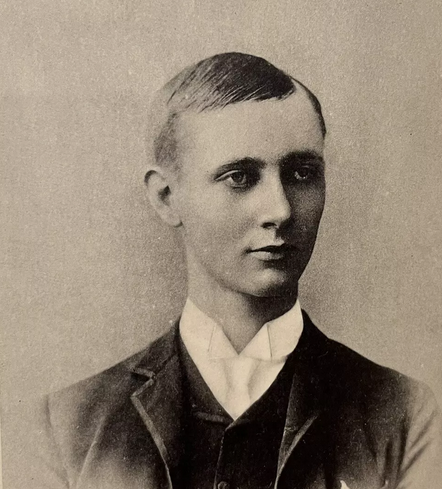
George Rublee 1886, 1st graduate of Groton School

George Rublee (1868–1957) was a U.S. lawyer who involved himself with state and national political reform during the Progressive Era (1910-1918) and with international affairs from 1917 to 1945.

Rublee spent much of his childhood in Europe, while his father Horace Rublee served for eight years as the United States Ambassador to Switzerland. In 1884, Rublee enrolled with the first students at the new Groton School in Massachusetts; in 1886 he became the sole member of Groton's first graduating class. He received a law degree from Harvard University in 1895. In the spring of 1896, he returned to Harvard for one semester to teach the contracts course in place of Professor Samuel Williston, who was unwell. At the end of the term, Rublee declined an invitation to join Harvard's faculty and returned to the practice of law.

After serving as assistant to Wall Street corporation lawyer Victor Morawetz in the 1890s and early 1900s, Rublee entered public life when he became political adviser to Governor Robert P. Bass to establish La Follette-inspired reforms in New Hampshire (1910–12). Rublee then served as adviser to Theodore Roosevelt on political-economic matters in the 1912 presidential campaign and as adviser to President Woodrow Wilson on anti-trust reform beginning in 1914. Rublee was the primary force behind the establishment of the Federal Trade Commission, upon which he served by recess appointment from 1915 to 1917.

Rublee pivoted to international affairs when he was appointed as U.S. representative to the London-based Allied Maritime Transport Council (AMTC) in 1917, where Rublee became an ardent internationalist while serving with Jean Monnet and James Arthur Salter on the AMTC. In 1921, Rublee became the third partner in Covington and Burling, the Washington, D.C. law firm co-founded by his Harvard schoolmate Edward B. Burling. Rublee remained a member of the firm until 1945, but after 1927 he devoted much of his time to international affairs. In 1928, Rublee became an adviser to Ambassador Dwight Morrow in his mission to Mexico. Rublee served on the U.S. delegation to the London Naval Conference in 1930, where he worked to promote U.S. cooperation with the Versailles treaty security system, and he was involved in several Latin American diplomatic missions during the 1930s. His public work climaxed in 1938 when Franklin Roosevelt requested Rublee become director of the London-based Intergovernmental Committee on Refugees Coming, which attempted to arrange for the resettlement of German and Austrian Jews prior to the outbreak of World War II. He negotiated an agreement with German diplomat Helmuth Wohlthat in February 1939 that would have permitted the emigration of 150,000 Jews, but it was never implemented due to the outbreak of the war in September. Therefore, he largely was unsuccessful in that effort other than being able secure visas for about 600 Jewish refugees to Argentina.

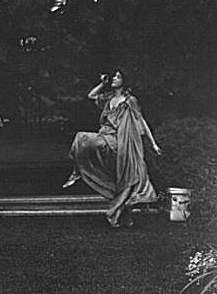
Juliet Barrett Rublee as Tacita the dryad, in a 1913 rehearsal for Sanctuary, A Bird Masque, by Percy MacKaye.

Rublee divided his time between residences in Washington, New York City, and Cornish, New Hampshire, where he had a house in the artist and intellectual community that grew up around sculptor Augustus Saint-Gaudens' workshop at the close of the 19th century. A genuine humanist and progressive thinker, Rublee sought to help find and implement solutions to pressing problems of his day. He was married to Juliet Barrett Rublee in 1899.

== Sources ==
- McClure, Marc. Earnest Endeavors: The Life and Public Work of George Rublee. Westport, Connecticut: Praeger, 2003.
- Westwood, Howard C.. Covington & Burling: 1919–1984. Washington, D.C.: Covington & Burling, 1986.
