= Bibliography of Los Angeles =

Flag of Los Angeles, California

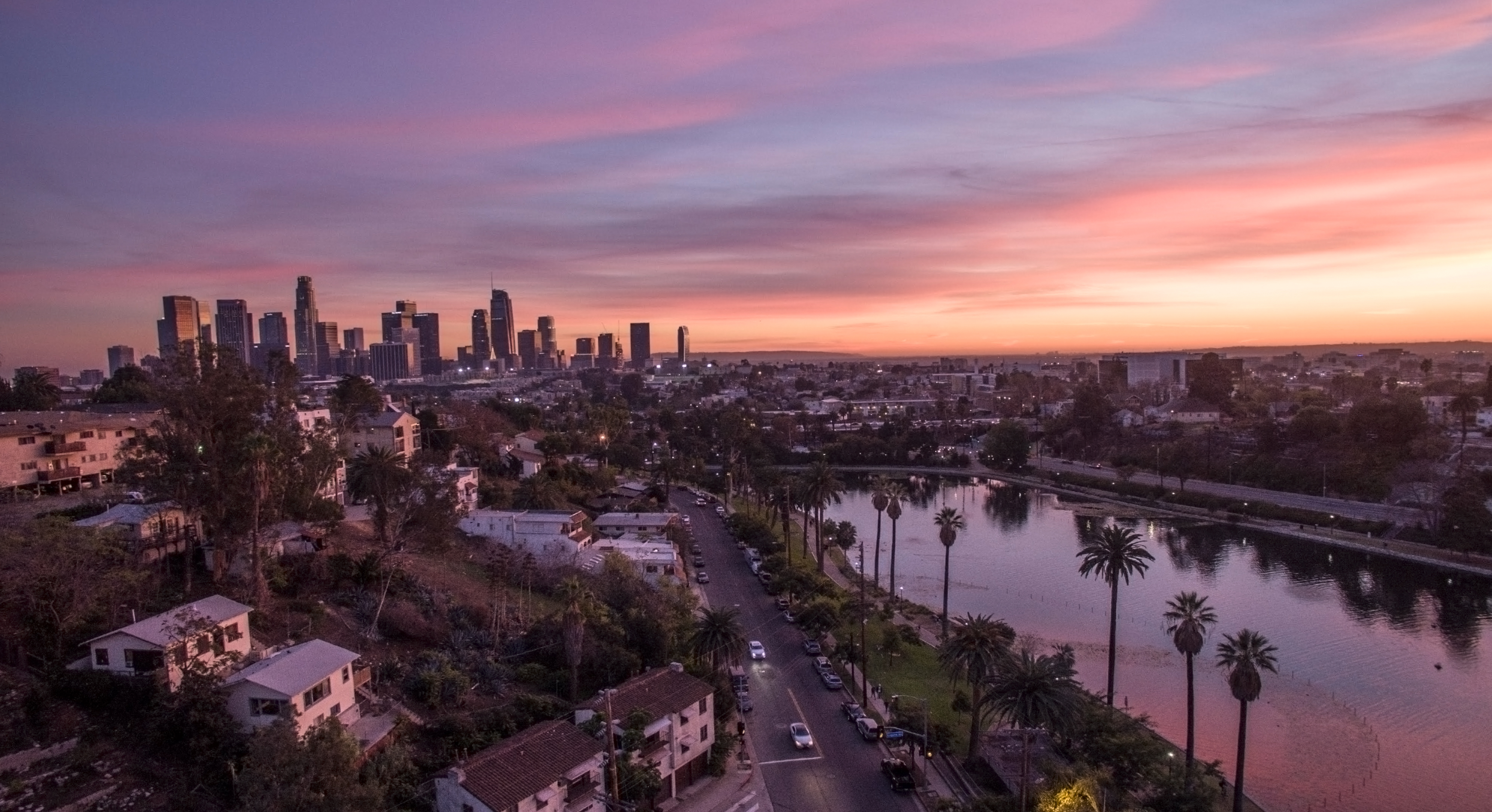
Echo Park Lake and Los Angeles Skyline

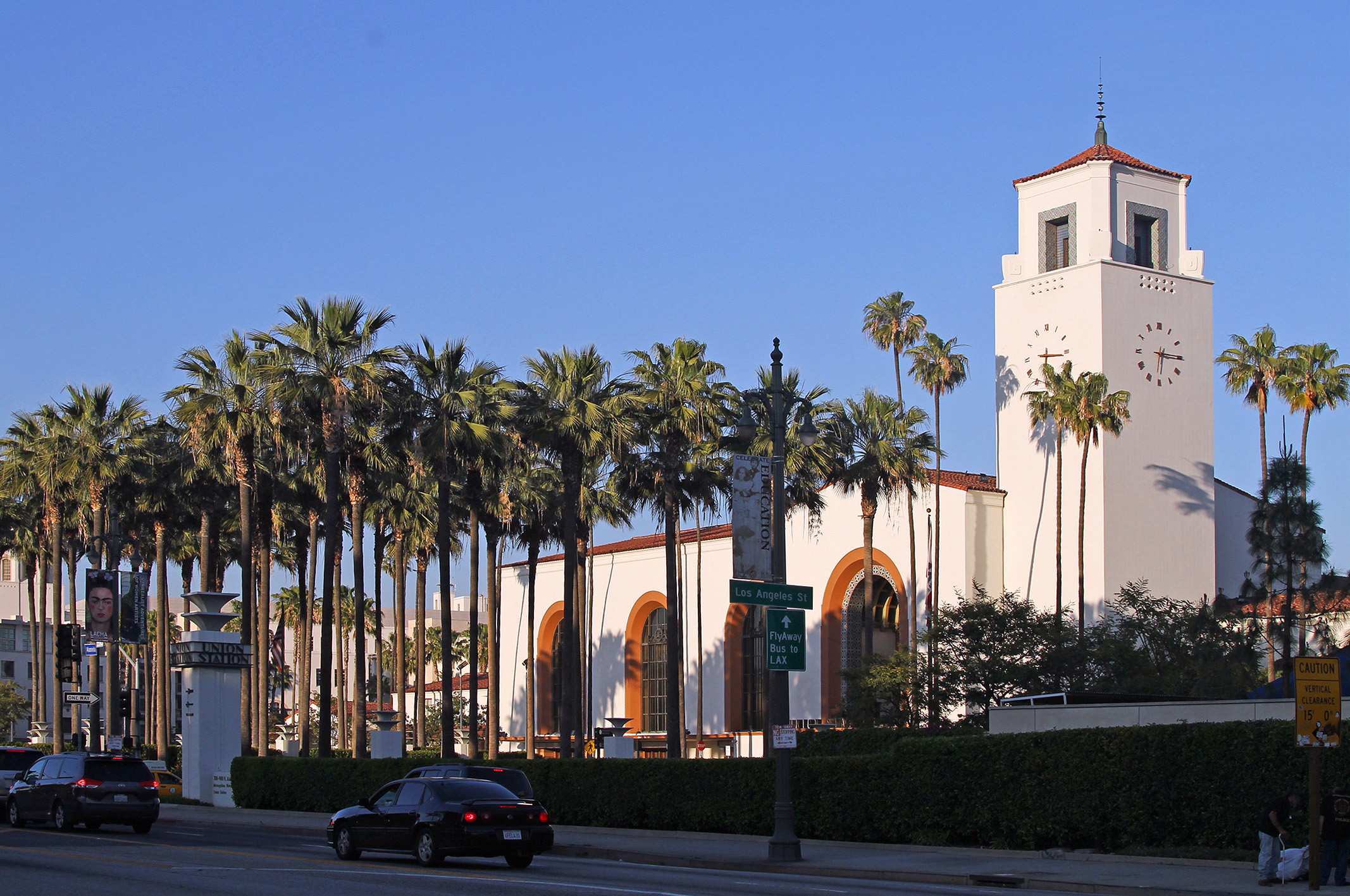
Union Station Los Angeles

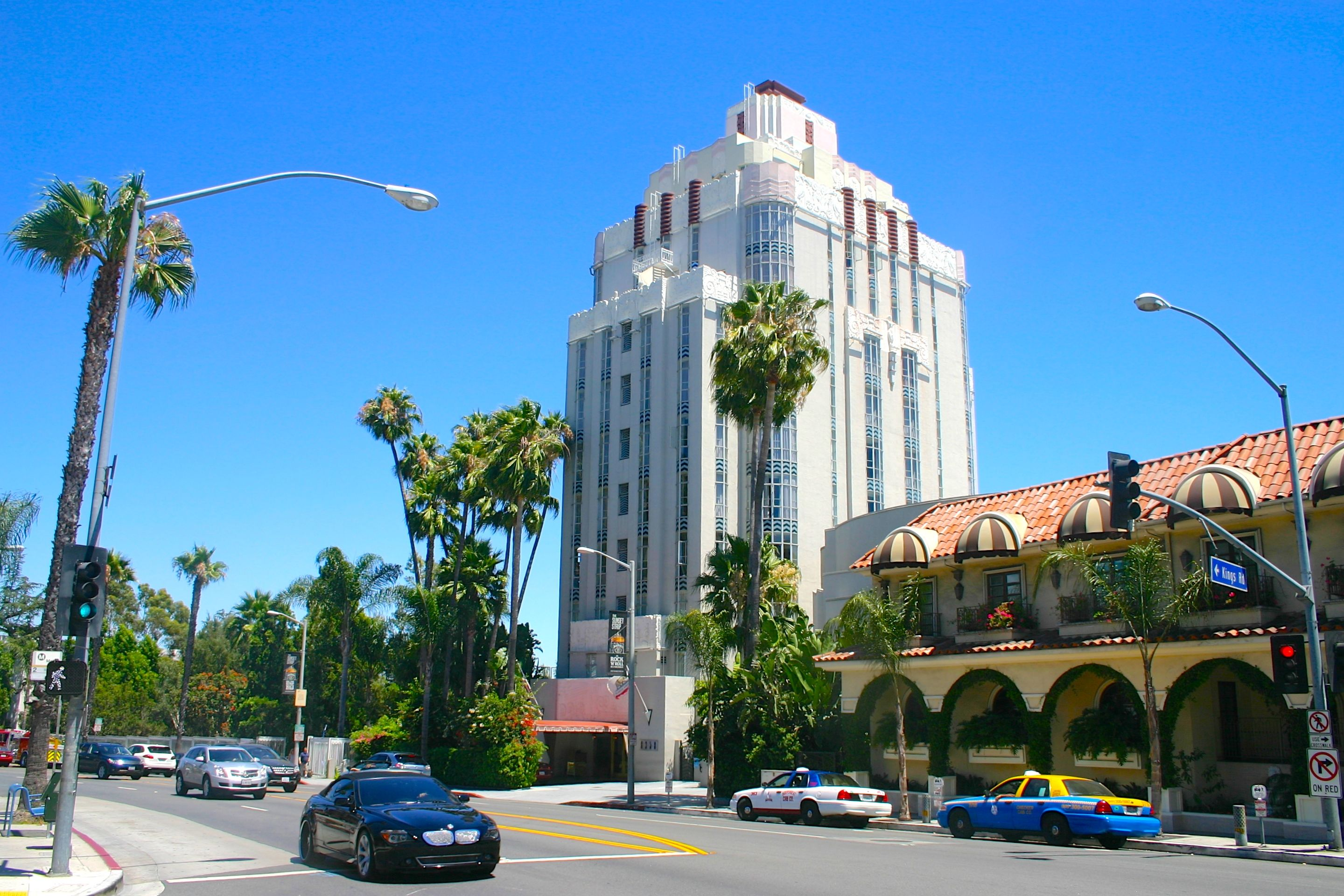
The Sunset Tower on Sunset Boulevard

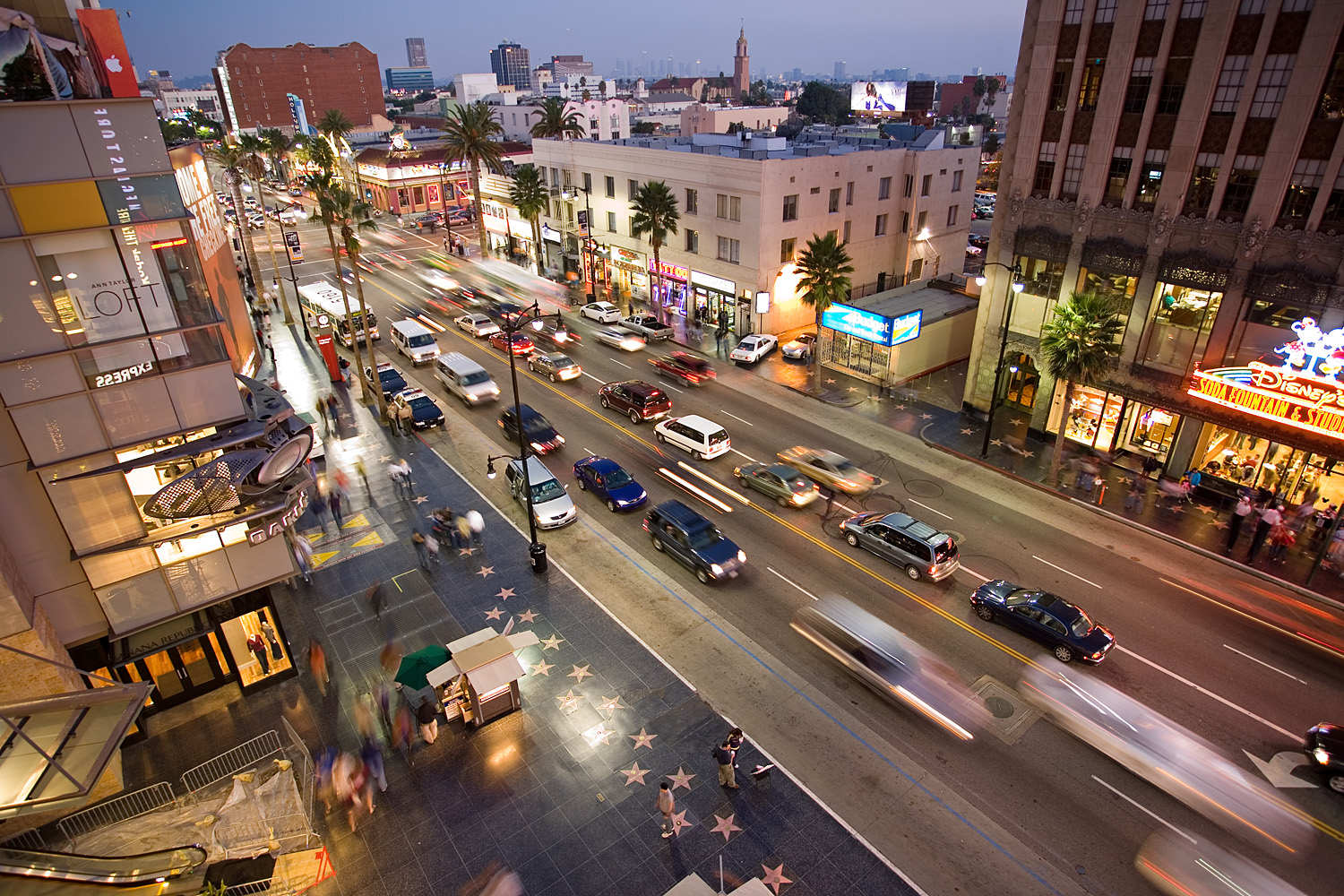
Hollywood Boulevard

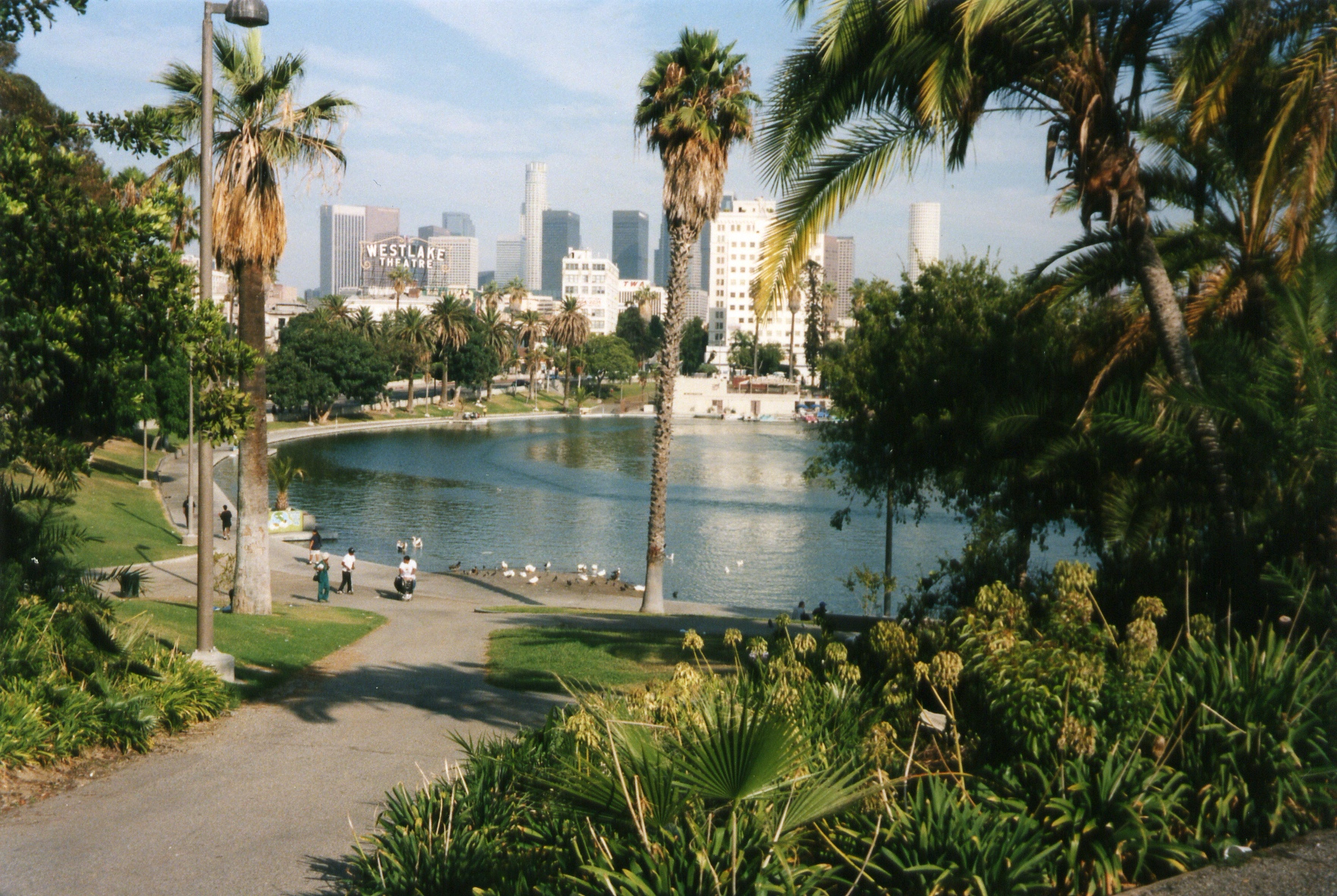
Macarthur Park, Los Angeles

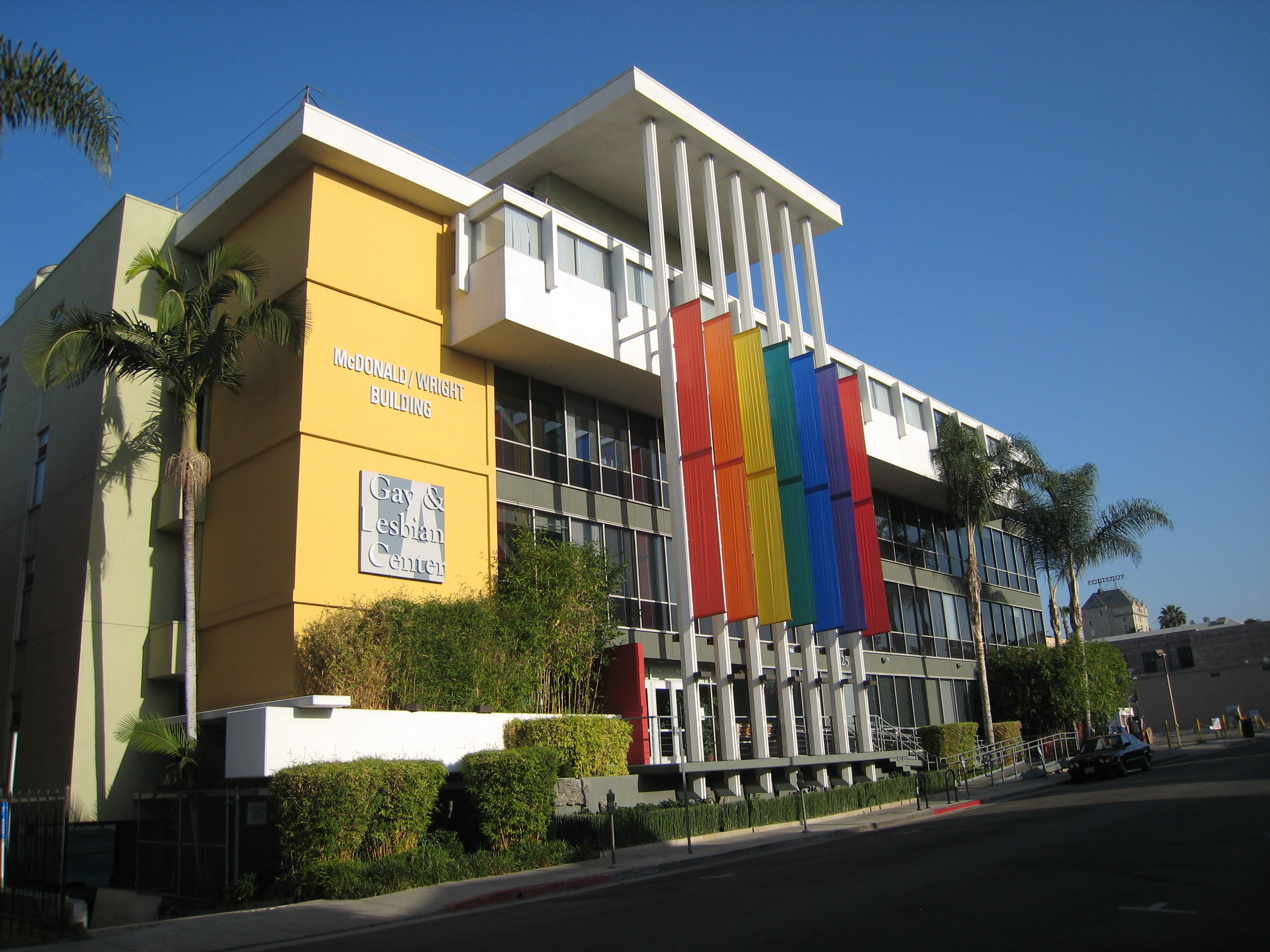
Los Angeles Gay and Lesbian Center

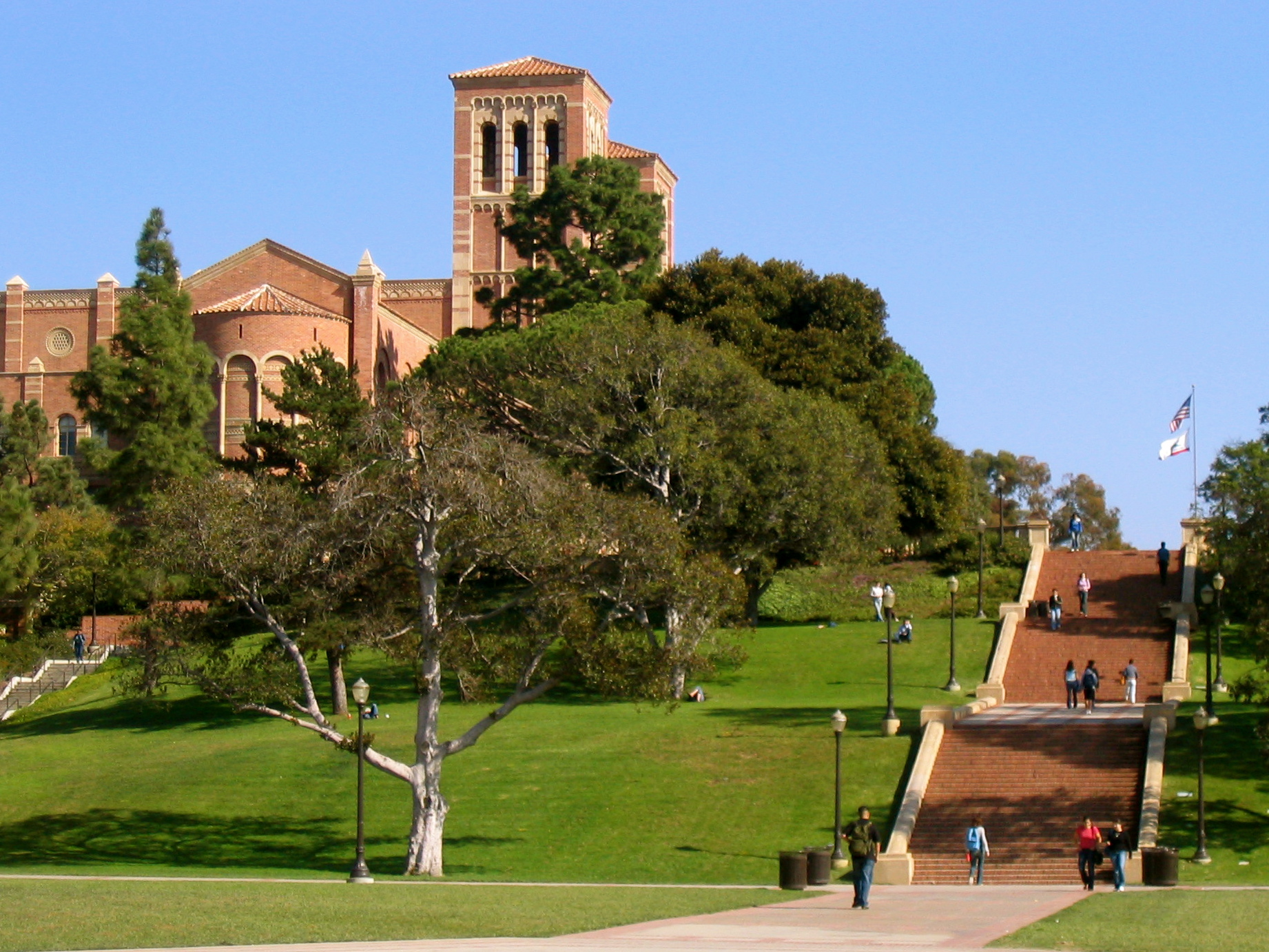
Janss Steps, right; Royce Hall, left, at UCLA

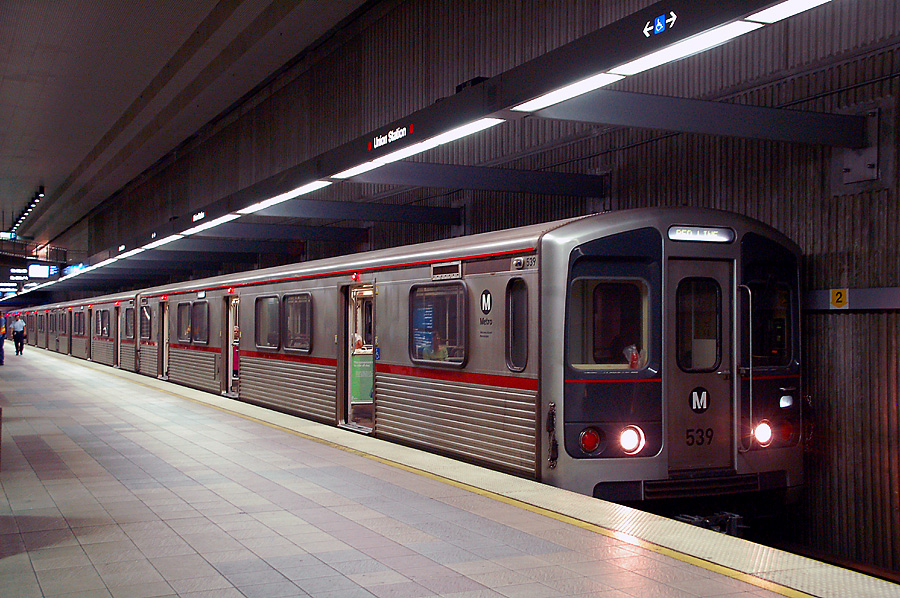
The Red Line, Los Angeles MetroRail

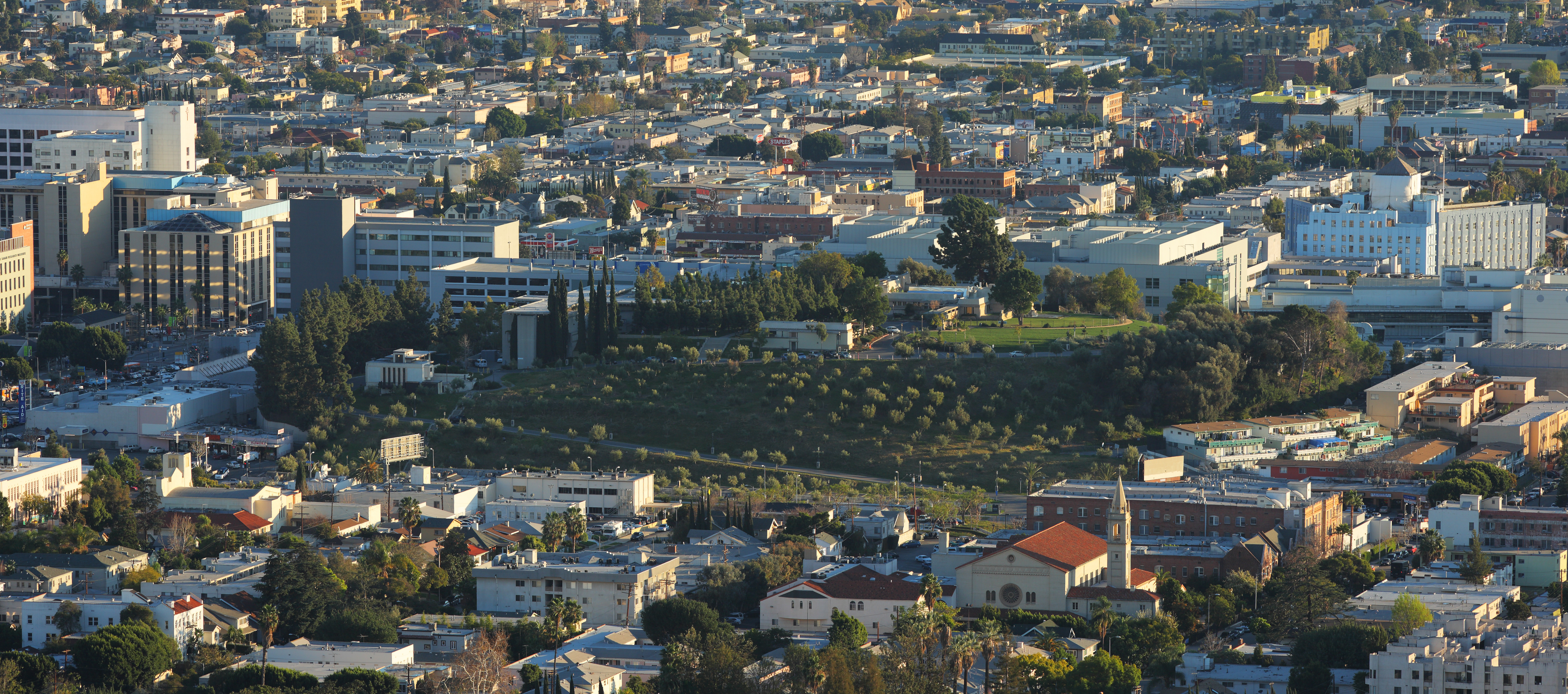
Barnsdall Art Park, Los Angeles

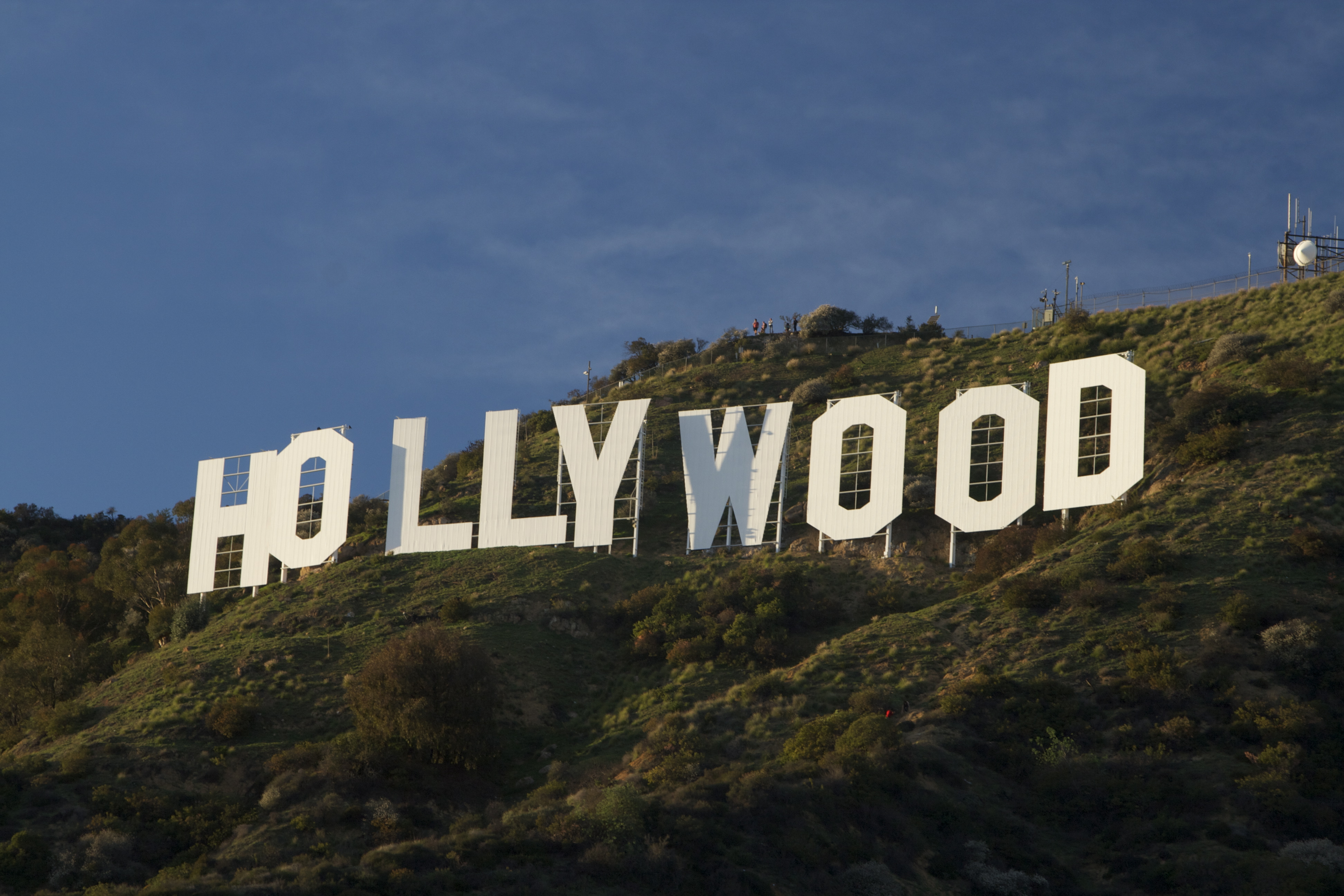
Hollywood Sign

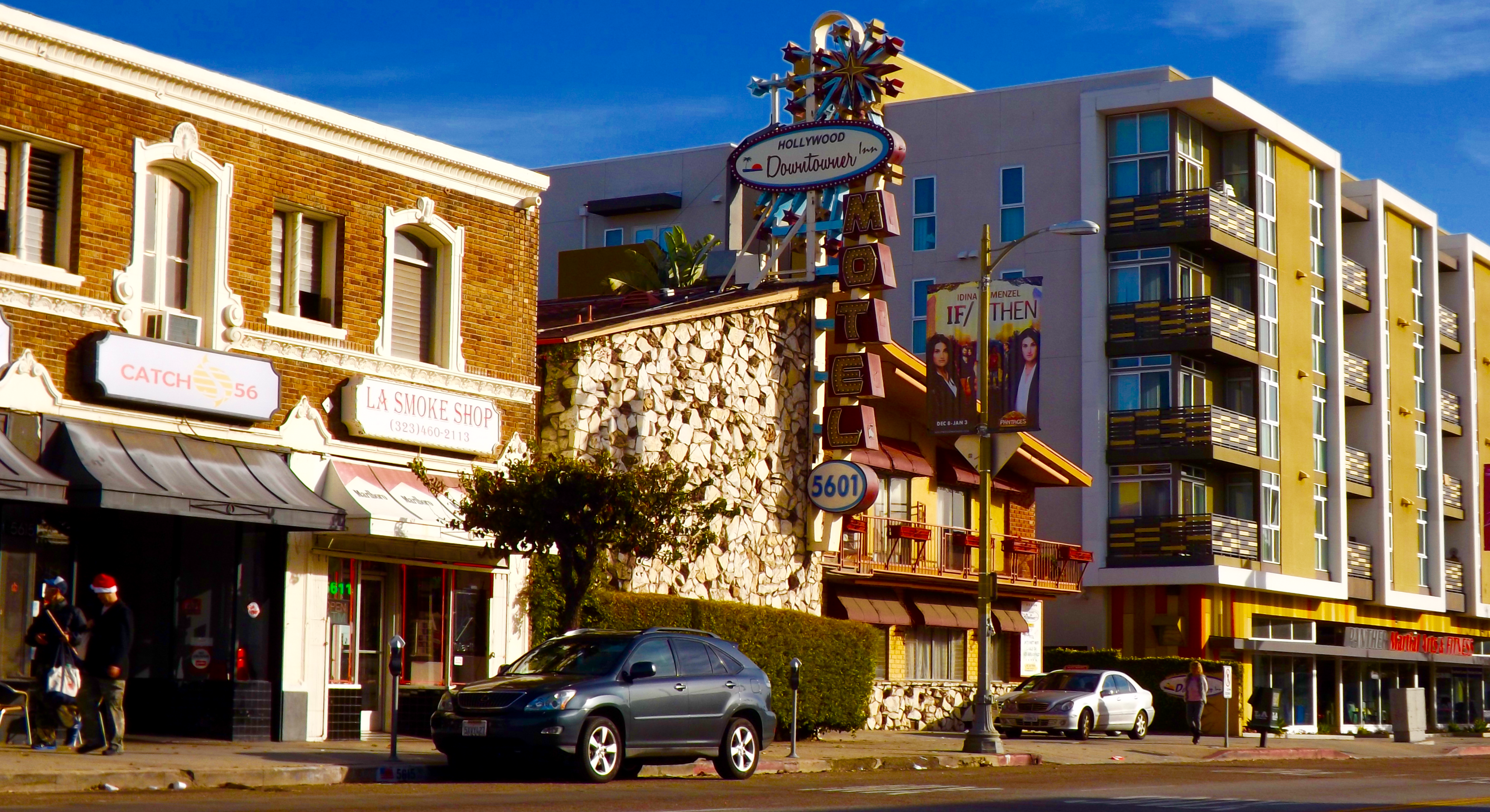
Hollywood Boulevard in Thai Town, Los Angeles

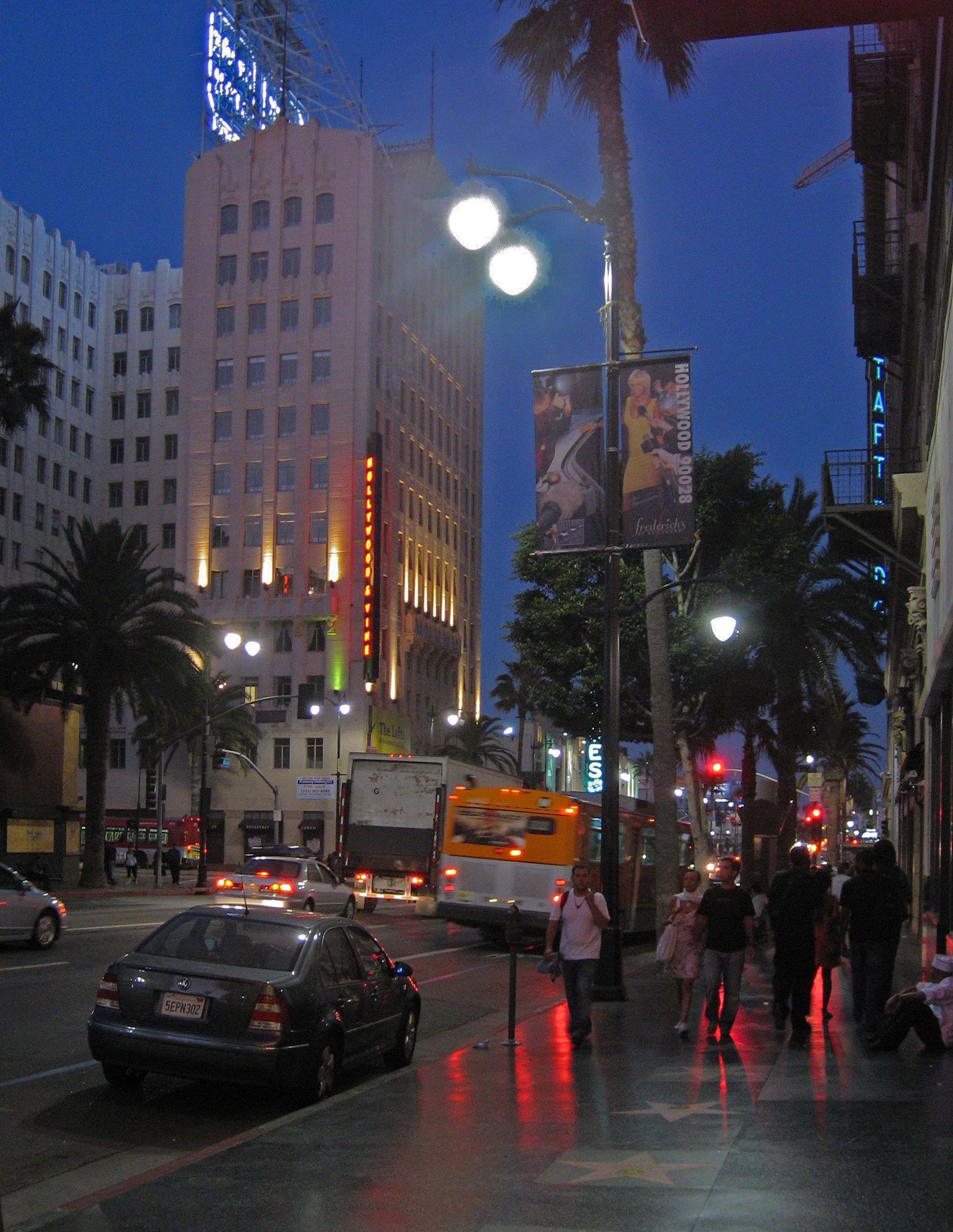
Hollywood Boulevard, Los Angeles

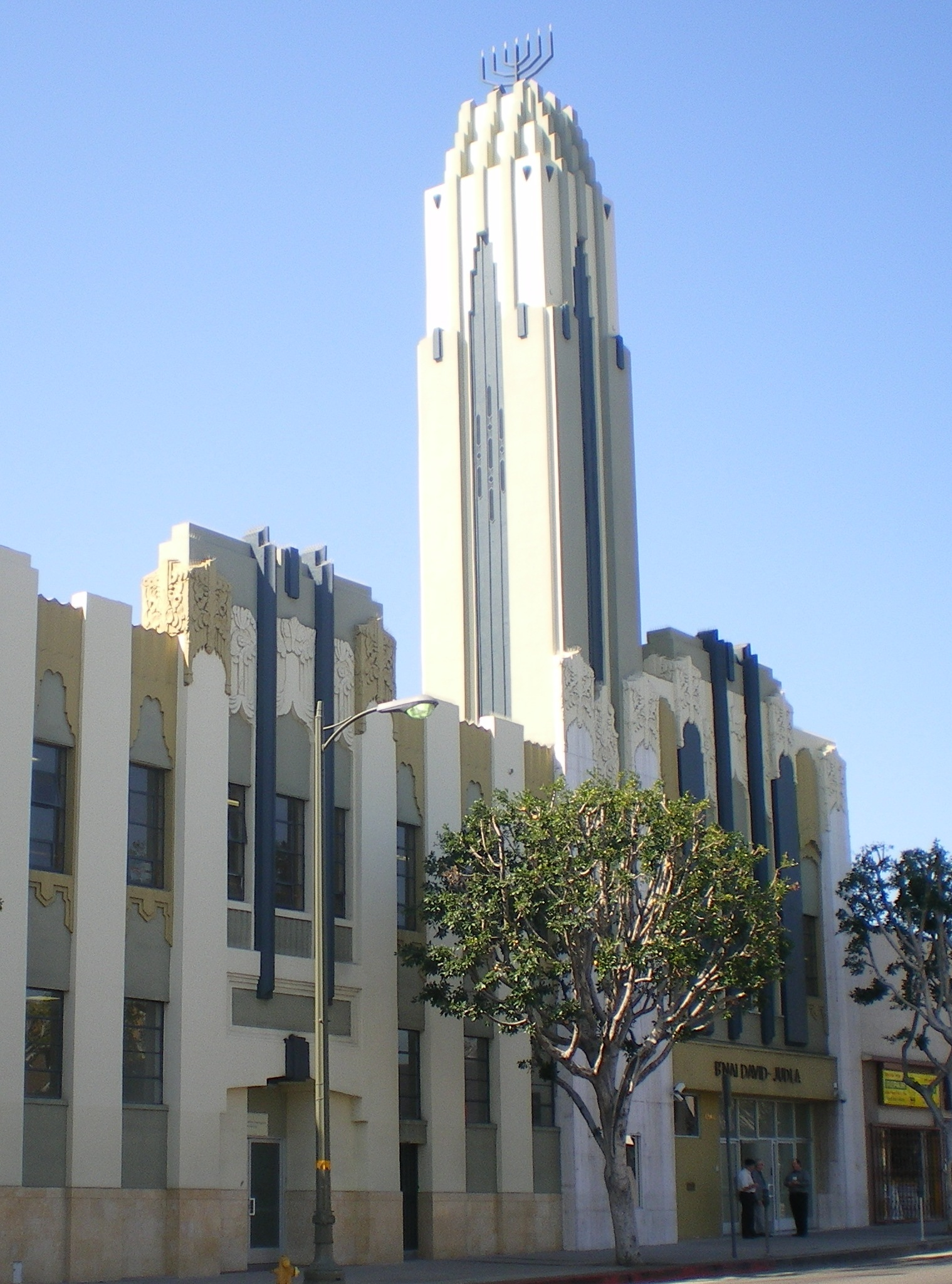
B'nai David Judea

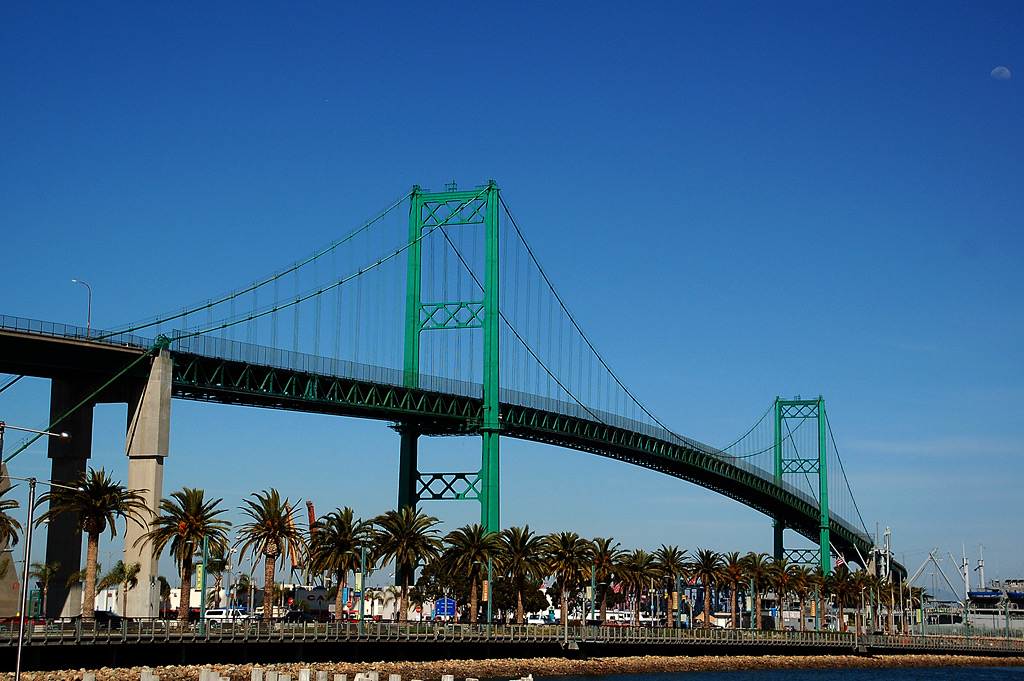
Vincent Thomas Bridge

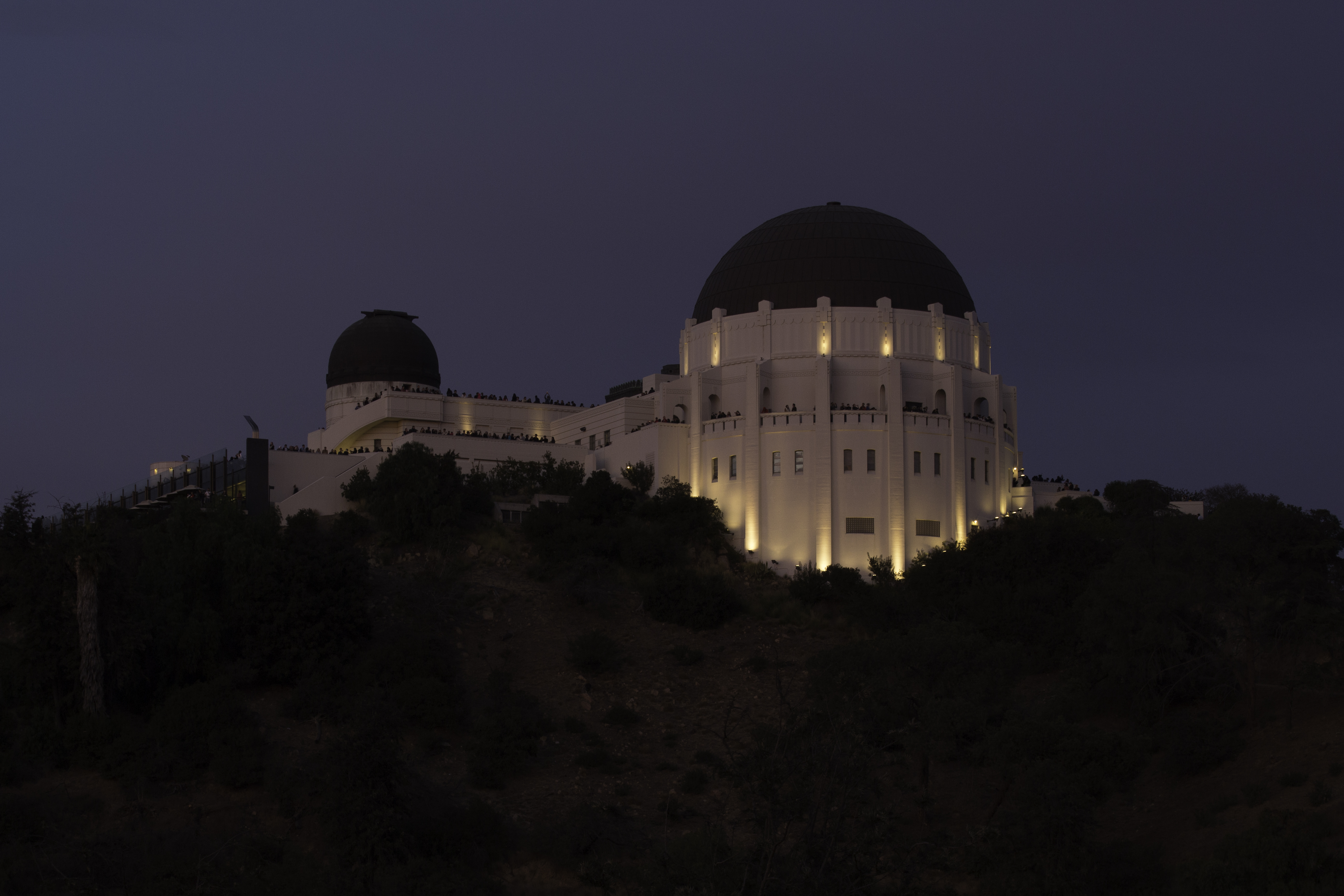
Griffith Observatory at dusk

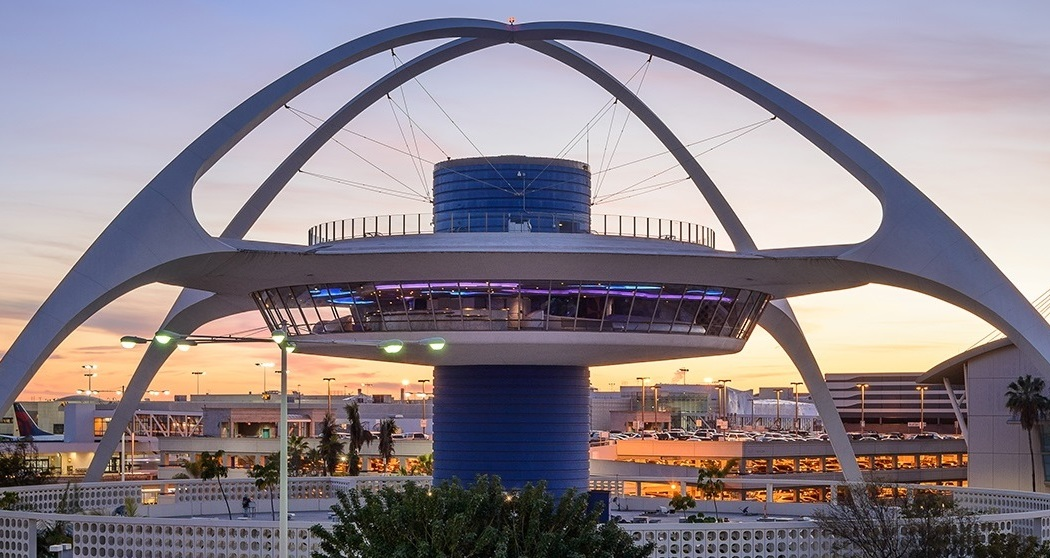
Los Angeles International Airport

This is a bibliography of Los Angeles, California. It includes books specifically about the city and county of Los Angeles and more generally the Greater Los Angeles Area. The list includes both non-fiction and notable works of fiction that significantly relate to the region. The list does not include annual travel books, recipe books, and currently does not contain works about sports in the region.

== History ==
=== California histories containing significant material on Los Angeles ===
- Guinn, J. M. Historical and biographical record of southern California; containing a history of southern California from its earliest settlement to the opening year of the twentieth century (1902) 1019 pp by a professional historian. The first 200 pages contain histories of each county. The last 800 pages contain several hundred short biographies. . online

== Kevin Starr ==
Kevin Starr, former Professor of History and California's State Librarian has written many highly regarded books on the history of California including the multi-volume Americans & the California Dream Series which contain a significant amount of history about Los Angeles and the surrounding area.

- California: A History. New York: Modern Library. (2007). 416 pp. Single Volume History of California.
- Coast of Dreams: California on the Edge, 1990–2003. New York: Knopf. (2004). 784 pp.

Americans & the California Dream Series by Kevin Starr

- Americans and the California Dream, 1850–1915. New York: Oxford University Press. (1973). 512 pp.
- Inventing the Dream: California through the Progressive Era. New York: Oxford University Press. (1985). 416 pp.
- Material Dreams: Southern California through the 1920s. New York: Oxford University Press. (1990). 496 pp.
- Endangered Dreams: The Great Depression in California. New York: Oxford University Press. (1996). 432 pp.
- The Dream Endures: California Enters the 1940s. New York: Oxford University Press. (1997). 512 pp.
- Embattled Dreams: California in War and Peace, 1940–1950. New York: Oxford University Press. (2003). 386 pp.
- Golden Dreams: California in an Age of Abundance, 1950–1963. New York: Oxford University Press. (2011). 576 pp.

=== Los Angeles histories ===
- Abu-Lughod, Janet L. New York, Chicago, Los Angeles: America's Global Cities (U of Minnesota Press, 1999), Compares the three cities in terms of geography, economics and race from 1800 to 1990
- Bills, Emily, "Connecting Lines: L.A.'s Telephone History and the Binding of the Region", Southern California Quarterly, 91 (Spring 2009), 27–67.
- Bollens, John C. and Geyer, Grant B. Yorty: Politics of a Constant Candidate. (1973). 245 pp. Mayor 1961–73
- Brook, Vincent. Land of Smoke and Mirrors: A Cultural History of Los Angeles (Rutgers University Press; 2013) 301 pages
- Buntin, John. L.A. Noir: The Struggle for the Soul of America's Most Seductive City. (2009). 432 pp.
- Davis, Mike. City of Quartz: Excavating the Future in Los Angeles (Verso Books, 2006).
- Davis, Mike, & Wiener, Jon. Set the Night on Fire: L.A. in the Sixties. (2020). New York: Verso Books.
- Emerson, Charles. 1913: In Search of the World Before the Great Warv (2013) compares Los Angeles to 20 major world cities; pp. 194–205.
- Fogelson, Robert M. The Fragmented Metropolis: Los Angeles, 1850–1930 (1967), focus on planning, infrastructure, water, and business
- Friedricks, William. Henry E. Huntington and the Creation of Southern California (1992), on Henry Edwards Huntington (1850–1927), railroad executive and collector, who helped build LA and Southern California through the Southern Pacific railroad and also trolleys.
- Garcia, Matt. A World of Its Own: Race, Labor, and Citrus in the Making of Greater Los Angeles, 1900–1970. (2001). 330 pp.
- Hart, Jack R. The Information Empire: The Rise of the Los Angeles Times and The Times Mirror Corporation. (1981). 410 pp.
- Holli, Melvin G., and Jones, Peter d'A., eds. Biographical Dictionary of American Mayors, 1820-1980 (Greenwood Press, 1981) short scholarly biographies each of the city's mayors 1820 to 1980. online; see index at p. 409 for list.
- Jaher, Frederic Cople. The Urban Establishment: Upper Strata in Boston, New York, Charleston, Chicago, and Los Angeles. (1982). 777 pp.
- Klein, Norman M. and Schiesl, Martin J., eds. 20th Century Los Angeles: Power, Promotion, and Social Conflict. (1990). 240 pp.
- Krist, Gary. The Mirage Factory: Illusion, Imagination, and the Invention of Los Angeles. (2018). 404 pp.
- Laslett, John H.M. Sunshine Was Never Enough: Los Angeles Workers, 1880–2010. Berkeley, CA: University of California Press, 2012.
- Lavender, David. Los Angeles, Two Hundred Years. (1980). 240 pp. heavily illustrated popular history
- Leader, Leonard. Los Angeles and the Great Depression. (1991). 344 pp.
- Lotchin, Roger W. ed. The Way We Really Were: The Golden State in the Second Great War (University of Illinois Press, 2000), essays by experts.
- Mullins, William H. The Depression and the Urban West Coast, 1929–1933: Los Angeles, San Francisco, Seattle, and Portland. (1991). 176 pp.
- Nicolaides, Becky M. My Blue Heaven: Life and Politics in the Working-Class Suburbs of Los Angeles, 1920–1965. (2002). 412 pp.
- O'Flaherty, Joseph S. An End and a Beginning: The South Coast and Los Angeles, 1850–1887. (1972). 222 pp.
- O'Flaherty, Joseph S. Those Powerful Years: The South Coast and Los Angeles, 1887–1917 (1978). 356 pp.
- Payne, J. Gregory and Ratzan, Scott C. Tom Bradley: The Impossible Dream. (1986). 368 pp., mayor 1973 to 1993 and a leading African American
- Raftery, Judith Rosenberg. Land of Fair Promise: Politics and Reform in Los Angeles Schools, 1885–1941. (1992). 284 pp.
- Rolle, Andrew. Los Angeles: From Pueblo to City of the Future. (2d. ed. 1995). 226 pp.; the only historical survey by a scholar
- Schiesl, Martin J. "Progressive Reform in Los Angeles under Mayor Alexander, 1909-1913." California Historical Quarterly 54.1 (1975): 37-56. online
- Sitton, Tom and Deverell, William, eds. Metropolis in the Making: Los Angeles in the 1920s. (2001). 371 pp.
- Standiford, Les. Water to the Angels: William Mulholland, His Monumental Aqueduct, and the Rise of Los Angeles. New York: Ecco. (2015). 314 pp.
- Torres-Rouff, David Samuel. Before L.A.: Race, Space, and Municipal Power in Los Angeles, 1781–1894. New Haven: Yale University press, 2013.
- Verge, Arthur C. Paradise Transformed: Los Angeles during the Second World War. (1993). 177 pp.
- Verge, Arthur C. "The Impact of the Second World War on Los Angeles" Pacific Historical Review 1994 63(3): 289–314. 0030–8684 in JSTOR

== Other nonfiction ==
=== General ===
- Fogelson, Robert M. The Fragmented Metropolis: Los Angeles, 1850-1930 (Univ of California Press, 1967) online.
- Glover, Paul (1995). Los Angeles: A History of the Future. Greenplanners. ISBN 978-0-9622911-0-4.
- Lotchin, Roger W. The Bad City in the Good War: San Francisco, Los Angeles, Oakland, and San Diego (Indiana University Press, 2003) online.
- McWilliams, Carey (2009). Southern California: An Island on the Land (9th ed.). Peregrine Smith. ISBN 978-0-87905-007-8.
- Pitt, Leonard, and Dale Pitt. "Los Angeles A to Z: An encyclopedia of the city and county." (University of California Press, 1997)0.
- Rieff, David (1992). Los Angeles: Capital of the Third World. Touchstone. ISBN 978-0-671-79210-7.
- Starr. Kevin and David Ulin (2009). Jim Heimann (ed.). Los Angeles: Portrait of a City. Taschen America. ISBN 978-3-8365-0291-7.
- Theroux, Peter (1994). Translating LA: A Tour of the Rainbow City. Norton. ISBN 978-0-393-31394-9.

=== Architecture and urban theory ===
- Reyner Banham (2009). Los Angeles: The Architecture of Four Ecologies (2nd ed.). Berkeley: University of California Press. ISBN 978-0-520-26015-3.
- Mike Davis (2006). City of Quartz: Excavating the Future in Los Angeles. Verso. ISBN 978-1-84467-568-5.
- Robert M. Fogelson (1993). The Fragmented Metropolis: Los Angeles 1850–1930. Berkeley: University of California Press. ISBN 978-0-520-08230-4.
- Norman M. Klein (1997). The History of Forgetting: Los Angeles and the Erasure of Memory. Verso. ISBN 978-1-84467-242-4.
- Sam Hall Kaplan (2000). L.A. Lost & Found: An Architectural History of Los Angeles. Hennessey and Ingalls. ISBN 978-0-940512-23-8.
- Richard Longstreth, ed. (2018) [1998], Historical bibliography of the built environment in the Los Angeles Metropolitan Area (PDF), US: Society of Architectural Historians
- Wim de Wit and Christopher James Alexander (2013). Overdrive: L.A. Constructs the Future, 1940–1990. Getty Publications. ISBN 978-1-60606-128-2.

=== LGBT ===
- Lillian Faderman and Stuart Timmons (2006). Gay L. A.: A History of Sexual Outlaws, Power Politics, And Lipstick Lesbians. Basic Books. ISBN 0-465-02288-X.
- Daniel Hurewitz (2007). Bohemian Los Angeles: and the Making of Modern Politics. Berkeley: University of California Press. ISBN 978-0-520-24925-7.

=== Art and literature ===
- Rebecca Peabody; Andrew Perchuk; Glenn Phillips; Rani Singh; Lucy Bradnock, eds. (2011). Pacific standard time: Los Angeles art, 1945-1980. Los Angeles: Getty Research Institute and the J. Paul Getty Museum. ISBN 978-1-60606-072-8.
- David L. Ulin, ed. (2002). Writing Los Angeles: A Literary Anthology. Library of America. ISBN 978-1-931082-27-3.
- Cécile Whiting (2008). Pop L.A.: Art and the City in the 1960s. Berkeley: University of California Press. ISBN 978-0-520-25634-7.
- Jones, K. (2017). South of Pico: African American Artists in Los Angeles in the 1960s and 1970s (Illustrated ed.). Duke University Press. ISBN 978-0-8223-6145-9.

=== Economics, business and labor ===
- Davis, Clark. (2001) Company men: White-collar life and corporate cultures in Los Angeles, 1892-1941 (JHU Press) online
- Findley, James Clifford. (1958) "The Economic Boom of the 'Twenties in Los Angeles" (PhD Dissertation, The Claremont Graduate University; ProQuest Dissertations & Theses, 1958. 5904416).
- Hernandez, Kim. (2010) "The 'Bungalow Boom': The Working-Class Housing Industry and the Development and Promotion of Early Twentieth-Century Los Angeles." Southern California Quarterly 92.4: 351-392.
- Hester, Yolanda, and Teresa Barnett. (2024) "Community and Commerce: Oral Histories of Black Business in Los Angeles." Public Historian 46.3 (2024): 7-37.
- Kazin, Michael. (1986) "The Great Exception Revisited: Organized Labor and Politics in San Francisco and Los Angeles, 1870-1940" Pacific Historical Review 55#3 pp.371-402 JSTOR 3639704.
- Morales, Rebecca. (1986) "The Los Angeles automobile industry in historical perspective." Environment and Planning D: Society and Space 4.3: 289-303.
- Orsi, Richard J. (1991) "Railroads in the History of California and the Far West: An Introduction." California History 70.1 (1991): 2-11. JSTOR 25158549
- Perry, Louis B., and Richard S. Perry. (1962) A History of the Los Angeles Labor Movement, 1911-1941 ( Univ of California Press). online
- Stimson, Grace Heilman. (2022) Rise of the labor movement in Los Angeles (Univ of California Press) online
- Trevizo, Dolores, and Mary J. Lopez. (2016) "Neighborhood segregation and business outcomes: Mexican immigrant entrepreneurs in Los Angeles County." Sociological Perspectives 59.3: 668-693.

=== Guides, architecture, geography ===
- Esparza, Bill (2014). "Tacopedia". Los Angeles Magazine.
- Herman, Robert D. Downtown Los Angeles: A Walking Guide (2004) 270 pp.
- Mahle, Karin, and Martin Nicholas Kunz. Los Angeles: Architecture & Design (2004) 191 pp.
- Nelson, Howard J. The Los Angeles Metropolis. (1983). 344 pp. geography
- Pitt, Leonard and Dale Pitt. Los Angeles A to Z: An Encyclopedia of the City and County. (1997). 605 pp. short articles by experts excerpts and text search

=== Contemporary issues ===
- Abu-Lughod, Janet L. (1999). New York, Chicago, Los Angeles: America's Global Cities. Archived from the original on June 5, 2011 – via Questia.
- Bloch, Stefano. Going All City (2019) is an up close and personal analysis of 1990s graffiti and gang cultures. https://www.amazon.co.uk/Going-All-City-Struggle-Subculture/dp/022649358X
- Dear, Michael J., H. Eric Schockman, and Greg Hise, eds. Rethinking Los Angeles (1996) interprets LA in terms of "postmodern urbanism" model. It consists of several fundamental characteristics: a global-local connection; a ubiquitous social polarization; and a reterritorialization of the urban process in which hinterland organizes the center (in direct contradiction to the Chicago School model of cities). The resultant urbanism is distinguished by a centerless urban form termed "keno capitalism."
- Fine, David. Imagining Los Angeles: A City in Fiction. (2000). 293 pp.
- Flanigan, James. Smile Southern California, You're the Center of the Universe: The Economy and People of a Global Region (2009) excerpt and text search
- Fulton, William. The Reluctant Metropolis: The Politics of Urban Growth in Los Angeles. (1997). 395 pp.
- Gottlieb, Robert. Reinventing Los Angeles: Nature and Community in the Global City (2007) excerpt and text search
- Scott, Allen J. and Soja, Edward W., eds. The City: Los Angeles and Urban Theory at the End of the Twentieth Century. (1996). 483 pp.

=== Planning, environment and autos ===
- Bottles, Scott L. Los Angeles and the Automobile: The Making of the Modern City. (1987). 302 pp.
- Davis, Margaret Leslie. Rivers in the Desert: William Mulholland and the Inventing of Los Angeles. (1993). 303 pp.
- Davis, Mike. City of Quartz: Excavating the Future in Los Angeles. (1990). 462 pp.
- Desfor, Gene, and Roger Keil. Nature And The City: Making Environmental Policy In Toronto And Los Angeles (2004) 290 pp.
- Deverell, William, and Greg Hise. Land of Sunshine: An Environmental History of Metropolitan Los Angeles (2006) 350 pp. excerpt and text search
- Dewey, Scott Hamilton. Don't Breathe the Air: Air Pollution and U.S. Environmental Politics, 1945–1970. (2000). 321 pp., focuses on LA smog
- Hise, Greg. Magnetic Los Angeles: Planning the Twentieth-Century Metropolis. (1997). 294 pp.
- Jacobs, Chip; Kelly, William (2008). Smogtown: The Lung-Burning History of Pollution in Los Angeles. Outlook Hardcover. ISBN 978-1-58567-860-0.
- Keane, James Thomas. Fritz B. Burns and the Development of Los Angeles: The Biography of a Community Developer and Philanthropist. (2001). 287 pp.
- Longstreth, Richard. The Drive-In, the Supermarket, and the Transformation of Commercial Space in Los Angeles, 1914–1941. (1999). 248 pp.
- Longstreth, Richard. City Center to Regional Mall: Architecture, the Automobile, and Retailing in Los Angeles, 1920–1950. (1997). 504 pp.
- Mulholland, Catherine. William Mulholland and the Rise of Los Angeles. (2000). 411 pp.
- Post, Robert C. Street Railways and the Growth of Los Angeles (1989). 170 pp.
- Rajan, Sudhir Chella. The Enigma of Automobility: Democratic Politics and Pollution Control. (1996). 202 pp.
- Marc Reisner (1986). Cadillac Desert: The American West and its Disappearing Water. Penguin Books. ISBN 978-0-14-017824-1.

=== Hollywood ===
- Balio, Tino. Grand Design: Hollywood as a Modern Business Enterprise, 1930–1939. (1993). 483 pp.
- May, Lary. The Big Tomorrow: Hollywood and the Politics of the American Way (2000)
- Schatz, Thomas. The Genius of the System: Hollywood Filmmaking in the Studio Era. (1988). 492 pp.
- Smith, Catherine Parsons. Making Music in Los Angeles: Transforming the Popular. University of California Press, 2007. (A social history covering c. 1887–1940)
- Stevens, Steve and Lockwood, Craig. King of the Sunset Strip: Hangin' with Mickey Cohen and the Hollywood Mob. (2006). 295 pp.
- Vaughn, Stephen. Ronald Reagan in Hollywood: Movies and Politics. (1994). 359 pp.
- Wells, Walter. Tycoons and Locusts: A Regional Look at Hollywood Fiction of the 1930s (1973)

=== Religion ===
- Engh, Michael E. Frontier Faiths: Church, Temple, and Synagogue in Los Angeles, 1846–1888. (1992). 267 pp.
- Engh, Michael E. "'A Multiplicity and Diversity of Faiths': Religion's Impact on Los Angeles and the Urban West, 1890–1940", Western Historical Quarterly 1997 28(4): 462–492. 0043-3810 in JSTOR
- Weber, Francis J. Magnificat: The Life and Times of Timothy Cardinal Manning. (1999). 729 pp. The Catholic archbishop from 1970 to 1985.
- Weber, Francis J. His Eminence of Los Angeles: James Francis Cardinal McIntyre. (1997). 707 pp. Catholic archbishop from 1948 to 1970.
- Weber, Francis J. Century of Fulfillment: The Roman Catholic Church in Southern California, 1840–1947. (1990). 536 pp.

=== Ethnicity and Race ===
- Abelmann, Nancy and Lie, John. Blue Dreams: Korean Americans and the Los Angeles Riots. (1995). 272 pp.
- Acuña, Rodolfo F. Anything but Mexican: Chicanos in Contemporary Los Angeles. (1996). 328 pp.
- Allen, James P. and Turner, Eugene. The Ethnic Quilt: Population Diversity in Southern California. (1997). 282 pp.
- Bedolla, Lisa García. Fluid borders: Latino power, identity, and politics in Los Angeles (2005) 278 pp.; excerpt and text search
- Cannon, Lou. Official Negligence: How Rodney King and the Riots Changed Los Angeles and the LAPD. (1997). 698 pp.
- Degraaf, Lawrence B. "The City of Black Angels: Emergence of the Los Angeles Ghetto, 1890–1930". Pacific Historical Review 1970 39(3): 323–352. in JSTOR
- Greenwood, Roberta S., ed. Down by the Station: Los Angeles Chinatown, 1880–1933. (1996). 207 pp.
- Griswold del Castillo, Richard. The Los Angeles Barrio, 1850–1890: A Social History. (1979). 217 pp.
- Gutierrez, Ramon A., and Patricia Zavella, eds. Mexicans in California: Transformations and Challenges essays by leading scholars (2009)
- Hamilton, Nora and Chinchilla, Norma Stoltz. Seeking Community in a Global City: Guatemalans and Salvadorans in Los Angeles. (2001). 296 pp.
- Hayashi, Brian Masaru. "For the Sake of Our Japanese Brethren": Assimilation, Nationalism, and Protestantism among the Japanese of Los Angeles, 1895–1942 (1995). 217 pp.
- Horne, Gerald. Fire This Time: The Watts Uprising and the 1960s. (1995). 424 pp.
- Keil, Roger. Los Angeles: Globalization, Urbanization, and Social Struggles. (1998). 295 pp.
- Leclerc, Gustavo; Villa, Raúl; and Dear, Michael, eds. Urban Latino Cultures: La Vida Latina en L.A. (1999). 214 pp.
- Loza, Steven. Barrio Rhythm: Mexican American Music in Los Angeles. (1993). 320 pp.
- Lynell George (1992). No Crystal Stair: African Americans in the City of Angels. Verso. ISBN 978-0-86091-389-4.
- Min, Pyong Gap. Caught in the Middle: Korean Communities in New York and Los Angeles. (1996). 260 pp.
- Modell, John. The Economics and Politics of Racial Accommodation: The Japanese of Los Angeles, 1900–1942. (1977). 201 pp.
- Monroy, Douglas. Rebirth: Mexican Los Angeles from the Great Migration to the Great Depression. (1999). 322 pp.
- Moore, Deborah Dash. To the Golden Cities: Pursuing the American Jewish Dream in Miami and L.A. (1994). 358 pp.
- Oberschall, Anthony. "The Los Angeles Riot of August 1965", Social Problems, Vol. 15, No. 3 (Winter, 1968), pp. 322–341 in JSTOR, black riots in Watts
- Ong, Paul, ed. The New Asian Immigration in Los Angeles and Global Restructuring. (1994). 330 pp.
- Eduardo Obregón Pagán (2006). Murder at the Sleepy Lagoon: Zoot Suits, Race, and Riot in Wartime L.A. The University of North Carolina Press. ISBN 978-0-8078-5494-5.
- Ríos-Bustamante, Antonio and Castillo, Pedro. An Illustrated History of Mexican Los Angeles, 1781–1985. (1986). 196 pp.
- Rodolfo Acuña (1996). Anything but Mexican: Chicanos in contemporary Los Angeles. Verso. ISBN 978-1-85984-031-3.
- Saito, Leland T. Race and Politics: Asian Americans, Latinos, and Whites in a Los Angeles Suburb. (1998). 250 pp.
- Sánchez, George J. Becoming Mexican American: Ethnicity, Culture, and Identity in Chicano Los Angeles, 1900–1945. (1993). 367 pp.
- Sides, Josh. L. A. City Limits: African American Los Angeles from the Great Depression to the Present (2003)
- R. J. Smith (2007). The Great Black Way: L.A. in the 1940s and the Last African American Renaissance. PublicAffairs. ISBN 978-1-58648-521-4.
- Valle, Victor M. and Torres, Rodolfo D. Latino Metropolis. (2000). 249 pp.
- Waldinger, Roger and Bozorgmehr, Mehdi, eds. Ethnic Los Angeles. (1996). 497 pp. studies by sociologists

==== Other ====
- Ethnic Los Angeles
- Race, Place, and Reform in Mexican Los Angeles: A Transnational Perspective, 1890–1940
- Rebirth: Mexican Los Angeles from the Great Migration to the Great Depression
- Irangeles: Iranians in Los Angeles
- The Making of Exile Cultures: Iranian Television in Los Angeles
- From the Shahs to Los Angeles: Three Generations of Iranian Jewish Women between Religion and Culture
- The Shifting Grounds of Race: Black and Japanese Americans in the Making of Multiethnic Los Angeles, by Scott Kurashige

=== Policing and law enforcement ===
- Escobar, Edward J. Race, police, and the making of a political identity: Mexican Americans and the Los Angeles Police Department, 1900-1945 (Univ of California Press, 2023). online
- Escobar, Edward J. "The dialectics of repression: The Los Angeles police department and the Chicano movement, 1968-1971." Journal of American History 79.4 (1993): 1483-1514. online
- Escobar, Edward J. "Bloody Christmas and the irony of police professionalism: The Los Angeles Police Department, Mexican Americans, and police reform in the 1950s." Pacific Historical Review 72.2 (2003): 171-199.
- Felker-Kantor, Max. "Liberal law-and-order: The politics of police reform in Los Angeles." Journal of Urban History 46.5 (2020): 1026-1049.
- Felker-Kantor, Max. Policing Los Angeles: Race, resistance, and the rise of the LAPD (UNC Press Books, 2018) online.
- Hays, Thomas G., and Arthur W. Sjoquist. Los Angeles Police Department (Arcadia Publishing, 2005).
- Herbert, Steve. Policing space: Territoriality and the Los Angeles police department (U of Minnesota Press, 1996) online.
- Lersch, Kim Michelle. "Book Review: Historic and Contemporary Perspectives on the Los Angeles Police Department." Criminal Justice Review 24.2 (1999): 181-186. online
- Woods, Kristi Joy. Be vigorous but not brutal: Race, politics, and police in Los Angeles, 1937–1945 (PhD dissertation, University of Southern California; ProQuest Dissertations & Theses, 1999. 9987591)..

=== Collections of primary sources ===
- Caughey, John and LaRee Caughey, eds. Los Angeles: Biography of a City. (1976). 510 pp. short excerpts from primary and secondary sources
- Diehl, Digby, ed. Front Page: 100 Years of the Los Angeles Times, 1881–1981. (1981). 287 pp.
- Rodríguez, Luis. Always Running: La Vida Loca: Gang Days in L.A. (1993); autobiographical novel
- Violence in the City – An End or a Beginning?, A Report by the Governor's Commission on the Los Angeles Riots, 1965 Official Report online, report on 1965 black riot in Watts; called the "McCone Report" after its chairman

=== Miscellaneous ===
- The Los Angeles Plaza: Sacred and Contested Space
- Loyd, Jenna (2014). Health Rights Are Civil Rights: Peace and Justice Activism In Los Angeles, 1963–1978. US: University of Minnesota Press. doi:10.5749/9781452976808 – via Big Ten Open Books.

== Fiction ==
- The Big Sleep, Raymond Chandler (1939)
- Play It as It Lays, Joan Didion (1970)
- The Black Dahlia, James Ellroy (1987)
- The Arrangement, Elia Kazan (1967)
- Speed-the-Plow, David Mamet (play, 1988)
- The Loved One: An Anglo-American Tragedy, Evelyn Waugh (1948)
- The Day of the Locust, Nathanael West (1939)

== See also ==
- History of Los Angeles
- List of museums in Los Angeles
- Bibliography of California history
