= Grant High School (Los Angeles) =

Ulysses S. Grant Senior High School
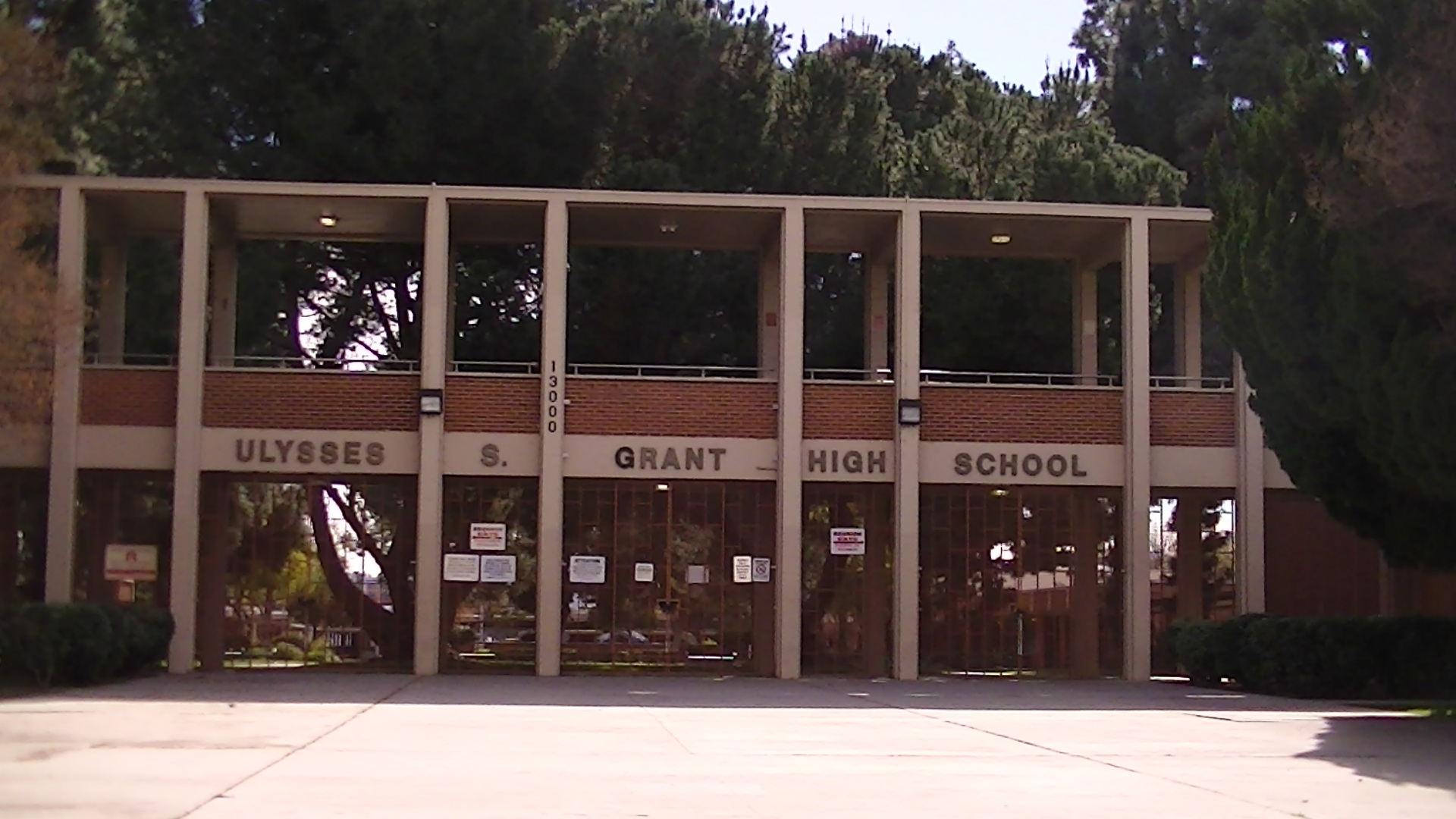

Location
- 13000 Oxnard Street; Valley Glen, California 91401; United States; 34°10′38″N 118°24′57″W

Information
- Type: Public high school
- Motto: What we are to be we are now becoming.
- Established: 1959; 67 years ago
- Status: 🟩 Opened
- Locale: City, Large
- School district: Los Angeles Unified School District
- NCES District ID: 0622710
- NCES School ID: 062271003052
- Principal: Rebecca McMurrin
- Teaching staff: 87.29 (on an FTE basis)
- Grades: 9–12
- Enrollment: 1,774 (2024–25)
  - Male: 961
  - Female: 813
- Student to teacher ratio: 20.32
- Colors: Brown; Orange; White
- Mascot: Lancer
- Newspaper: The Odyssey
- Yearbook: The Shield
- Website: www.granths.org

Ulysses S. Grant High School is a public high school located in the Valley Glen neighborhood of Los Angeles, California, United States, in the east central San Fernando Valley. It is located adjacent to Los Angeles Valley College.

It is part of District North 2 of the Los Angeles Unified School District. The school serves several areas, including Valley Glen, much of Sherman Oaks, and sections of both Van Nuys and North Hollywood.

== History ==
Grant opened as a high school in September 1959. Grant's original purpose was to serve as a high school for the families of World War II veterans who were moving into the San Fernando Valley. Its first students were baby boomers moving into suburban houses in the Valley.

It was in the Los Angeles City High School District until 1961, when it merged into LAUSD.

Reut Cohen of Neon Tommy, a publication of the Annenberg Media Center, wrote that in the 1970s and 1980s the school was "regarded as an excellent public institution."

In the 1990s there was ethnic tension between the Armenian students and the Hispanic and Latino students. An LAUSD official stated a belief that the tension may have originated from earthquake relief drives held in the 1980s which were meant to benefit Armenia and Mexico. Cohen stated that the ethnic tensions were a major factor in the decline of Grant's reputation in the 1990s.

The tensions exploded on October 21, 1999 when a fight between an Armenian girl and a Latina girl turned into a fight among 200 students. The fight resulted in 40 students being detained and minor injuries being inflicted on 10 students, some teachers, and a maintenance worker. No serious injuries occurred. In January 2000 the students signed a "peace treaty" to prevent future fighting. By February banners were erected which promoted peace. By October of that year there were discussion programs aimed at further reducing tension.

A fight involving almost 500 students occurred on March 8, 2005.

In 2006, Grant was relieved of many 9th and 10th graders by the opening of East Valley High School, which planned to phase in grades 11 and 12 in the following two years.

Ethnic tensions reappeared during an Armenian remembrance event in 2008.

Grant was featured in Newsweek magazine's April 17, 2008 cover story about 25 years of divorce in America; Grant was chosen as a prototypical suburban high school and the article featured members of the class of 1982 and their marital stories.

By 2019, Grant had become "a predominately Armenian school".

== Magnet Programs ==
College Prep of Digital Arts Magnet at Grant High School is a magnet program within Grant High School that focuses on enhancing college level skills. The program's center of interest is on Advancement placement and Honor level proficiency.

Since the year 1990 Humanities has been a small academy at Grant High School. The purpose of this academy was to build a sensed community and to challenge students academically. In August 2018, Humanitas was newly established as the "Humanities Magnet for Interdisciplinary Studies. The program would remain consistent of its original mission but with new enhancements. Students enrolled in this program will have access to Los Angeles Valley Community College, college courses, that are specifically open to the students in this program. The classes will count towards High School and College classes. In addition, Humanitas students have the ability to go on field trips and participate in school activities that are only accessible to them.

== Demographics ==
In the mid-20th century the school, as a part of the 'Fourth Jewish Ghetto' in Los Angeles, was composed primarily of Jewish students, perhaps as many as 80% of the student body and a similar proportion of the teachers. The tracking program in use revealed that at least 90% of the student body attended college, from local community colleges to Ivies, the majority being awarded scholarships and competitive financial support. At the time, Grant was ranked No. 3 among LA high schools, following Pacific Palisades and University High Schools. Deborah Dash Moore, the author of To the Golden Cities: Pursuing the American Jewish Dream in Miami and L.A., wrote that this made the presence of these Jewish students "more visible than numbers alone would warrant." Grant offered Modern Hebrew classes.

In 1978 the school had over 3,000 students. In 1999 the school had 3,400 students, and there were 3,300 students in 2000. That year the student body was 51% Hispanic and Latino, 36% White, 6% African-American, 4% Asian, and 2% Filipino. Most of the Hispanic and Latino students were Mexican American and many of the Whites were Armenian American. As of 2000 the students originated from 48 countries. As of 2010 65% of the students were Hispanic and Latino, and 20% were Armenian.

The Hispanic and Latino students, as of 2015, often originated from families who migrated from Mexico and Central America and were born in the United States; they prefer to identify by their countries of origin even though they are grouped together as Hispanic and Latino. The Armenian students, as of 2015, originated in a wave of immigration from Armenia and the former Soviet Union that began in the early 1990s.

== Culture ==
In 2000 the socialization point for the Latinos was the south side of the school's quad, while the Armenians socialized in the north side. As of that year, fights between Armenian and Latino students often occurred in October. As of 2000 the common belief at the school was that Latinos wore baggy clothes while Armenians dressed more conservatively.

== Notable alumni ==
- Davie Allan, instrumental rock guitarist
- Gilbert Arenas, professional basketball player, NBA All-Star with Washington Wizards
- Rod Beck, Major League Baseball pitcher 1991-2003, 3-time All-Star
- David Bender, author, radio broadcaster
- Barry Carl, former Rockapella band member
- Mike Curb, Lt. Governor of California from 1979-1983, music producer
- Bobby Diamond, 1964, child actor and later Los Angeles lawyer
- Micky Dolenz, actor, musician and drummer of the Monkees
- John Dolmayan, rock drummer (System Of A Down)
- Moosie Drier, actor and occasional director
- Kevin Dubrow, lead singer, co-founder of the rock group Quiet Riot (d. 2007)
- Ike Eisenmann, actor, producer, sound effects specialist
- Ruthann Friedman, folk musician
- Lonn Friend, vice president of A & R for Arista Records
- Mitch Gaylord, 1984 Olympic gold medal-winning gymnast
- Jim Gordon, popular session drummer
- Jeff Green, former editor-in-chief of Games for Windows: The Official Magazine
- Tom Griffin, Major League Baseball player, 1969–82
- Joel Grover - Los Angeles Television News Investigative Reporter
- Melora Hardin, actress, Jan in The Office
- Cheryl Holdridge, actress, married to Lance Reventlow
- Craig Hundley, musician and former child actor, now known as Craig Huxley
- Dan Kalb, City Councilmember, Oakland, CA
- Gary Knell, National Geographic Society President and Chief Executive Officer
- Michael Landau, session guitarist
- Stan Lee (musician) Sobol, guitarist for band the Dickies, formed in 1977, Clown Princes of Punk
- Minnette Gersh Lenier, teacher of literacy and professional magician
- Kay Lenz, Emmy Award-winning actress, first wife of David Cassidy
- Barry Livingston, actor (including Ernie on My Three Sons)
- Steve Lukather, musician, member of the rock group Toto
- Larry Magid, technology journalist
- Bruce Manson, former professional tennis player
- Megan Marshack, journalist
- Barry "The Fish" Melton, guitarist and co-founder of the band Country Joe and the Fish
- Johnette Napolitano, musician, Concrete Blonde
- Jessie Nelson, filmmaker (Corinna, Corinna, I Am Sam, The Story of Us, Fred Claus)
- Paul Neubauer, violist of New York Philharmonic and instructor at Juilliard and Mannes College of Music
- Danny Nucci, actor
- David Paich, keyboardist, singer, composer and co-founder of the rock group Toto
- Fran Pavley, California State Senator
- Jeff Porcaro, drummer, co-founder of the rock group Toto (d. 1992)
- Mike Porcaro, member of rock group Toto
- Steve Porcaro, musician, composer, co-founder of rock group Toto
- Mike Post, composer of music and theme songs for popular TV series
- Riki Rachtman, television, radio and podcast host
- Marcia Reed, movie stills photographer
- Brian Robbins, actor in Head of the Class, director of Norbit
- Tom Scott, musician, writer of themes to Starsky & Hutch, The Streets of San Francisco, and Family Ties.
- Tom Selleck, actor
- Robert Shields, mime, dance and comedy with Shields and Yarnell
- Michael Simpson, Grammy Award-winning record producer and composer, one of the "Dust Brothers"
- Jim Umbarger, Major League Baseball player 1975-78
- Kim Ung-Yong
- Joseph Williams, film/TV composer and lead singer in rock group Toto
- Linda Wolf, photographer

== Use as a filming location ==
Grant High School has been featured in a number of film and television productions. This is due to a number of reasons; the most commonly cited of which is the fact that it is the only public high school within and across the entirety of the LAUSD system that has no readily visible palm trees growing on the property—thus hiding its precise geographics, and giving the location a generic, "Anytown, USA" type of feel when and where production teams deemed it necessary, or when shooting for other, outside locations. Secondary to this rationale is the long strip of road (known as "Lancer Lane") which runs between the eastern boundary of the school and a scenic greenbelt, walking path, and the Tujunga Wash, along with the availability of ample parking—combined with the ease of moving equipment around. Grant High School is also recognized as among the best high schools in the country for its film/video productions made by students of the communications/technology magnet.

Among the professional film and television productions that have utilized Grant High School as a filming location:

- American Born Chinese - Disney+ Original Series
- American Vandal - Primary location
- Balls of Fury - Auditorium and Campus
- Black-ish
- Clueless - the film and exterior shots and the television series
- Crazy, Stupid, Love
- CSI: Miami
- Dope
- Euphoria
- Foursome - YouTube Red series
- Ferris Bueller
- Freaks and Geeks
- Ghost Whisperer
- He's All That - Film on Netflix (2021)
- Life Goes On
- Malcolm in the Middle
- Mighty Morphin Power Rangers
- Mini's First Time - Lifetime Original Movie
- My Name Is Earl - TV Show on NBC
- Not Another Teen Movie
- Power Rangers in Space
- Power Rangers Turbo
- Power Rangers Zeo
- Project UFO - NBC TV Show (1978–79)
- Quincy, M.E. - NBC TV Show (1976–83)
- Reba
- Saved by the Bell - exterior shot
- Seduced By Madness: The Diane Borchardt Story
- Six Feet Under - Cable show (interior shots of class rooms)
- Teen Wolf (TV Series) - TV Show (Seasons 3–6)
- The 70's House - MTV Reality Show (Dodgeball scene)
- The Hollow - Movie based on the Legend of Sleepy Hollow
- The Office
- The Secret Life of the American Teenager - ABC Family TV Series
- The United States of Tara - Showtime Series
- True Blood - HBO Series
- What Really Happened to the Class of '65? - TV Series
- Where the Action Is - ABC TV Show (1965–67)
- Who's Your Daddy? - a direct-to-video feature film
- With Six You Get Eggroll - 1968 movie starring Doris Day and Brian Keith
- You Again
- Yours, Mine and Ours
- It's Always Sunny In Philadelphia (The Football Field)

Many music videos including:

- 3 Doors Down - "Loser" (hallways, teachers lounge, class rooms, and exterior shots)
- Deftones - "Back to School" (interior and exterior shots)
- Escape The Fate - "Situations"
- Hellogoodbye - "Baby It's Fact"
- N.E.R.D - "Rockstar"
- P Diddy - "It's All About the Benjamins" (used gym)
- Tantric - "Breakdown"
- The Offspring - "Kristy, Are you doing Okay?"
- Iggy Azalea - "Fancy"
- Wheatus - "Teenage Dirtbag"
