= Marion Kaplan =

American historian (born 1946)

- Born: January 24, 1946 (age 80); London, United Kingdom
- Education: Columbia University (MA, PhD)
- Occupation: Professor
- Employer: New York University
- Known for: National Jewish Book Prize winner and historian

Marion Kaplan (born January 24, 1946) is Skirball Professor of Modern Jewish History at New York University. She is a three-time winner of the National Jewish Book Award for her non-fiction writing about German-Jewish history, Jewish refugees, and Holocaust history. Established in 1950, these awards recognize outstanding achievement in Jewish writing and research.

Kaplan's scholarship has been recognized with several scholars-in-residence positions. In 2000-2001 she was a Fellow at the NY Public Library, Center for Scholars and Writers. In 2014–15, Kaplan was the J.B and Maurice C. Shapiro Senior Scholar in Residence at the Mandel Center for Advanced Study, United States Holocaust Memorial Museum, where she conducted research for her book into the Jewish refugee experience in Portugal. She was also Sara and Asa Shapiro Scholar in Residence at the USC Shoah Foundation in 2018-19 where she delivered the keynote lecture "Did Gender Matter During the Holocaust?" recognizing thirty years worth of research into women and gender in the Holocaust. She argued that while scholarship has come a long way since the 1983 conference on women and the Holocaust organized by Joan Ringelheim and Esther Katz, there remains a pressing need for research into all aspects of women's lives, in addition to race, class, geography, sexual violence, queer sexuality, bonding between women, and comparative approaches.

== Life ==
Kaplan did both her MA (1969) and PhD (1977) at Columbia University. She has two children, Joshua and Ruth, and is married to Douglas Morris.

== Publications ==
Kaplan has published several significant books in the field of German-Jewish History and Holocaust Studies including The Making of the Jewish Middle Class: Women, Family, and Identity in Imperial Germany (1991). Her book, Dominican Haven: The Jewish Refugee Settlement in Sosua, 1940-1945 (Museum of Jewish Heritage, NY, 2008), was a finalist for the Jewish Book Award (2008). In 2011, her book Gender & Jewish History (Indiana University Press), written with co-editor Deborah Dash Moore in honor of historian Paula Hyman, was awarded the National Jewish Book Award in the category of Anthologies and Collections. Her most recent book is: Hitler's Jewish Refugees: Hope and Anxiety in Portugal (Yale, 2020).

Her research draws on archival collections, newspapers and Jewish community publications, but also on diaries, letters and memoirs that shed light on individual experience and everyday life. All of her books have been translated into German.
