= Joel Grover =

American journalist

- Education: University of California, Berkeley
- Occupation: Journalist

Joel Grover was an investigative journalist for KNBC in Los Angeles, California. He is nationally known for his undercover investigations, exposes and consumer reports.

== Education and early career ==
Joel Grover graduated from Ulysses S. Grant High School in Van Nuys, CA in 1977. After attending the University of California, Berkeley, he began his career in Grand Junction, Colorado. After working for the NBC affiliate local news broadcast in Las Vegas, NV, he took a job as an investigative reporter at KSTP Minneapolis before coming to Los Angeles as a reporter for KCBS. In 2003 he joined KNBC's Investigative Team. Grover was a contestant on "Password Plus" while he was attending UC Berkeley.

== Investigative work ==
Grover's investigative work has changed laws, attitudes and entire government systems.

Grover's hidden-camera reports on restaurant cleanliness revealed employees of many restaurants not washing hands, not washing food, dropping it onto the floor and worse. The report put pressure on lawmakers in the County of Los Angeles to enact a letter-grade system after semi-monthly inspections. Another undercover investigative piece on Jiffy Lube oil-change scams helped reorganize the entire company.

In 2008, he exposed how thousands of children in the LA Unified School District were drinking water contaminated with unsafe amounts of lead. The District put over 1000 fountains dispensing tainted water out of commission and has installed filters at over 200 schools.

In 2009, he caught city agencies breaking city water laws by wasting water and subsequently being liable for thousands of taxpayer dollars in fines. He also caught Los Angeles Mayor Antonio Villaraigosa watering his lawn at illegal times despite calling on the public to stop using water.

== Awards ==
Grover has won countless awards for his investigative reporting, including 22 Emmys, six National Edward R. Murrow Awards, two Investigative Reporters and Editors Medals, three Society of Professional Journalists Medals, the Peabody and the DuPont-Columbia.
