= Ruthann Friedman =

American singer-songwriter

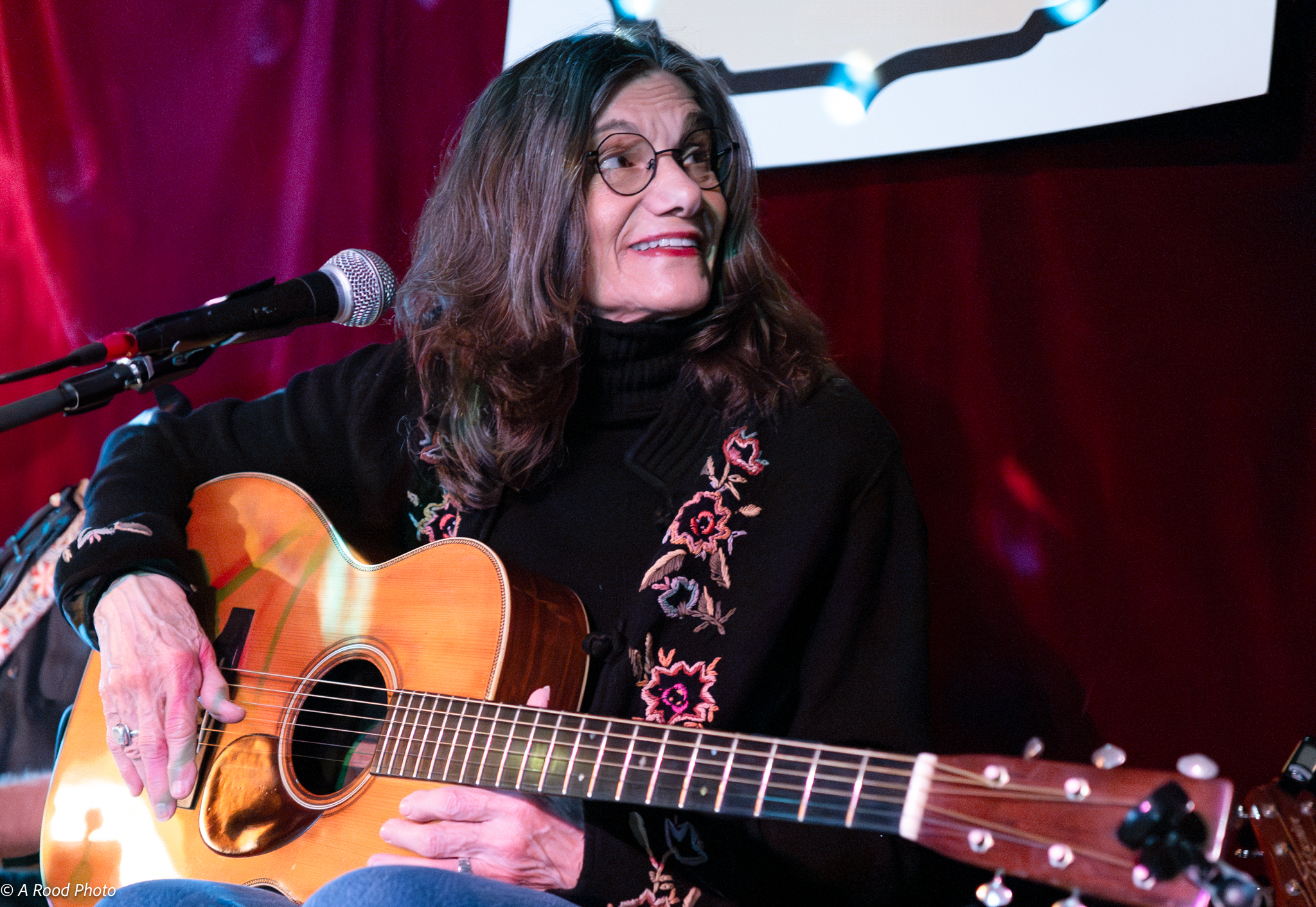
- Ruthann Friedman at the UnUrban Coffee House in Santa Monica, California in 2023
- Born: July 6, 1944 (age 82); Bronx, New York
- Occupation: Singer-songwriter
- Notable work: "Windy" (songwriter)
- Spouse: Jeffrey Carlisle (m. 1979)
- Children: 2 daughters

Ruthann Friedman (born July 6, 1944) is an American folk singer-songwriter and guitarist best known for writing the hit song "Windy" for the American sunshine pop band The Association.

== Early years ==
Born in Bronx, New York, Friedman spent her formative years in the San Fernando Valley, north of Los Angeles after her family moved to Southern California when she was 10. She started playing guitar at the age of eight while listening to Woody Guthrie, Pete Seeger and Josh White.

After moving to California, Friedman recalled feeling "very isolated" with few friends, so she started playing guitar in her room. Her first song gained her a spot on the television talent show Rocket to Stardom at age 12. While at Ulysses S. Grant High School, she started playing "Hoot Nights" at The Troubadour in West Hollywood, where she met the musicians Steve Mann and Hoyt Axton and became part of the growing musical scene of Los Angeles.

== Career ==
Her first paid performance was at the Green Spider Coffee House in Denver, Colorado, at the age of nineteen. Soon she was part of the hippie migration to the West, traveling the California Coast and living off earnings from her performances. While staying in San Francisco, Friedman befriended the members of Jefferson Airplane, Country Joe and Janis Joplin. Her friendship with Van Dyke Parks not only influenced her deep commitment to music but also introduced her to The Association, who recorded her song "Windy" in 1967. Friedman wrote "Windy" in 20 minutes while living in an apartment in David Crosby's house.

In 1968, she was part of the band Petrus, which also included Peter Kaukonen.

Two years later, Constant Companion, her first solo album, was released by Reprise Records. She also wrote and sang the songs for the cult movie The Peace Killers, released in 1971. While on tour promoting the album, Friedman suddenly returned to her family's Los Angeles home after a family tragedy and stopped recording music altogether in 1972–73.

In 2006, Water, a San Francisco label, reissued Constant Companion, renewing interest in Friedman's music. Prior to the 2006 reissue, Friedman had been out of the music business for more than thirty years, spending the intervening time running her own stationery company, raising two daughters and earning a degree in English from UCLA. Later in 2006, Water released a compilation of rare and previously unreleased home recordings from 1965 to 1971, Hurried Life.

After the re-release of Constant Companion, Friedman was invited to play at a local festival. She recalls that she had "to learn to play [guitar] again" and was taught the songs from her album by a guitarist at a local folk venue, McCabe's Guitar Shop in Santa Monica, but "it took about two years [of practicing] for me to get my chops back." Friedman has been performing locally in Los Angeles since that time.

== Discography ==
Constant Companion

- Released: 1969
- Format: LP, CD
- Label: Reprise
- Writers: Ruthann Friedman (tracks 2-12); Charles Shaw, Dick Kuhn, Jerry Kanner (track 1)
- Producer: Joe Wissert
- Tracks: 12
- Bonus tracks: 1 (2006 reissue)
  Twelve (The Complete Constant Companion Sessions 2014 Now Sounds re-release)

"Carry On (Glittering Dancer)" from the album Constant Companion (2006 and 2014 reissues)

- Released: 1970
- Format: 7" LP
- Label: Reprise
- Writer: Ruthann Friedman
- Producer: Van Dyke Parks, Kirby Johnson
- Tracks: 1

Hurried Life (Lost Recordings 1965–1971)

- Released: 2006
- Format: CD
- Label: Water
- Writers: Ruthann Friedman; Friedman and Peter Kaukonen (track 4); Tandyn Almer (track 15)
- Tracks: 15

White Dove / Motorcycle Madness

- Released: 2011
- Format: 7" LP
- Label: Ether
- Writer: Ruthann Friedman
- Producer: Van Dyke Parks, Kirby Johnson
- Tracks: 2

Chinatown

- Released: 2013
- Format: CD
- Label: Wolfgang Records
- Tracks: 11

Windy, A Ruthann Friedman Songbook

- Released: 2013
- Format: CD
- Label: Now Sounds
- Tracks: 18
