= Joan Ringelheim =

Historian (1939–2021)

- Born: May 29, 1939; Brooklyn, New York
- Died: October 22, 2021 (aged 82); Columbia, Maryland
- Occupation: Research Director
- Employer: United States Holocaust Memorial Museum
- Known for: Directed the US oral history archive

Joan Ringelheim (May 29, 1939 – October 22, 2021) was the Research Director of the Permanent Exhibition, Director of Education and Director of Oral History at the United States Holocaust Memorial Museum, where she oversaw its survivor testimony collection. She had worked on creating the museum's permanent exhibit. She would donate her collection which came, in part, from her organisation of the first conference about women, during the Holocaust.

== Life ==
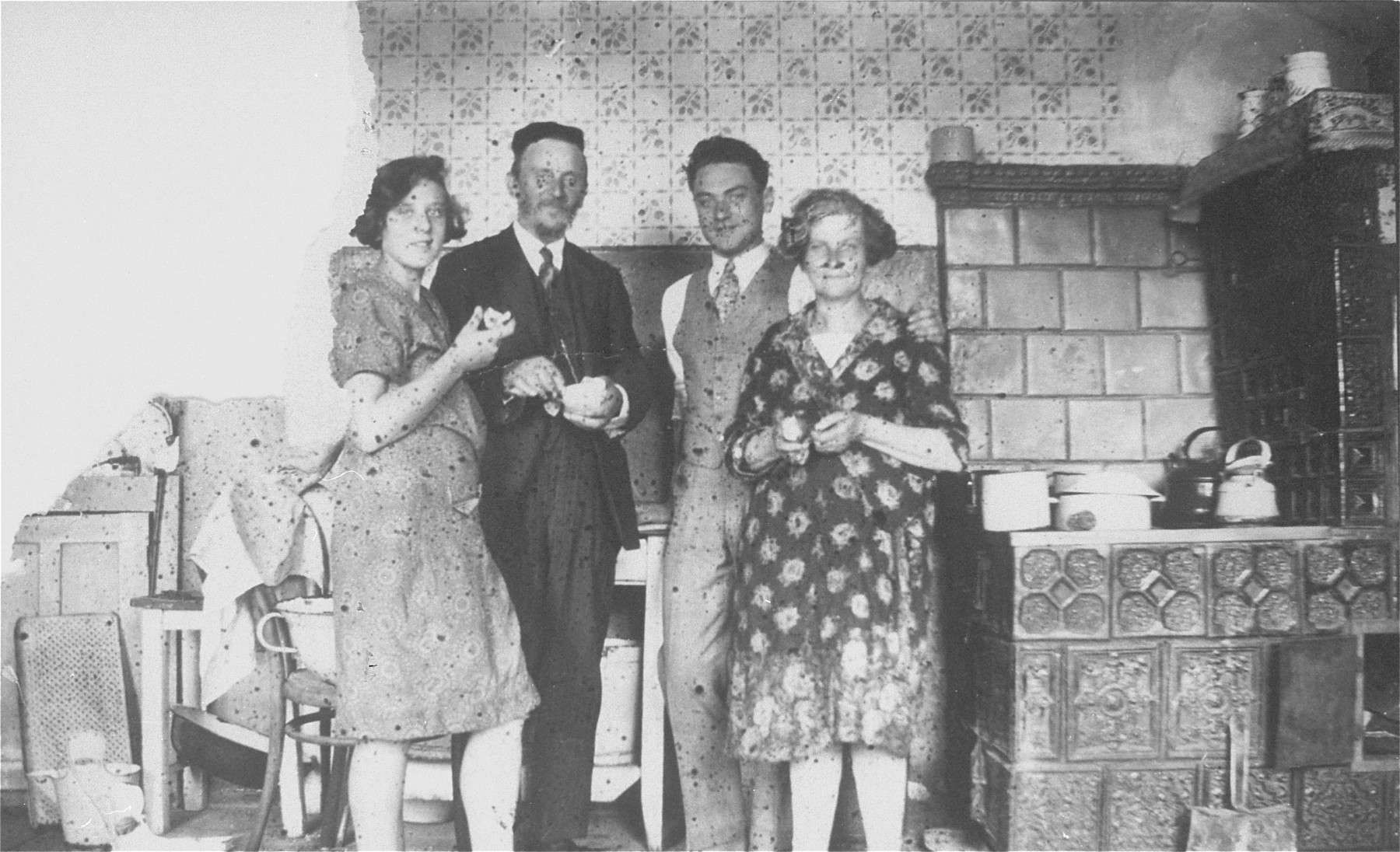
Pictured are Chaja, Jacob, her father David and Miriam Ringelheim in Hungary in 1928. (Her father was visiting)

Ringelheim was born in 1939 in Brooklyn. She was the daughter of Polish Jews who emigrated to the United States. Her father had a business and her mother was a clerk. Her first degree was in history but she studied philosophy for her master's degree and doctorate. Her university education was all in Boston.

She became a pioneer in the study of women and the Holocaust. In The Unethical and Unspeakable: Women and the Holocaust Ringelheim said that the universalized construct of Holocaust experiences had overshadowed women's perspective seeking to comprehend the Holocaust, which she called "gender neutral". She demanded a reassessment of "all generalizations and gender-neutral statements about survival, resistance and maintenance or collapse of moral values, and the dysfunction of culture in the camps and ghettos" from the perspective of women. She argued that the ways that women "constructed survival strategies and meaningful choices in varying conditions of powerlessness" needed to be considered.

While a Kent Fellow at The Center for the Humanities at Wesleyan University, Ringelheim co-organized with Esther Katz a conference on women and the Holocaust which took place at Stern College for Women at Yeshiva University in 1983. As a result, Ringelheim gathered a large amount of scholarly material which became part of her collection of interviews, photos and other documentation.

The 1983 conference was the first time women's specific experiences of the camps and ghettos were discussed in a scholarly forum. As Skirball Professor of Modern Jewish History at New York University Marion Kaplan recalled, the conference was the first large-scale initiative into feminist study of women's experience. It was organized around four questions directed at survivors by panelists and participants: Were women less or more vulnerable during the Holocaust because they were women? What survival strategies specific to women did they employ? What was the nature of women's resistance and, what were relationships between and among women like? This conference still holds relevance today for bringing together Holocaust Studies and Women's Studies. Ringelheim "was credited by colleagues with leading historians to a deeper understanding of the Holocaust in all its dimensions." In her 1985 article in Signs: Journal of Women in Culture and Society, Ringelheim noted the different ways in which women experienced the Shoah, including humiliation, molestation, rape, and sexual exchange in the camps and ghettos, in resistance groups, and in hiding and passing as well.

In 2000 she was credited as Program Producer of the book, Voices from Auschwitz, when it was published by the United States Holocaust Memorial Museum.

She interviewed author and survivor Ruth Klüger and historian Ian Kershaw on the TV network C-SPAN. Ringelheim's papers are housed at the United States Holocaust Memorial Museum. she died of breast cancer in 2021 at 82

== Legacy ==
She gave her collection to the United States Holocaust Memorial Museum in 2007 when she retired as Director. She donated more in 2016.
