= Robert M. Fogelson =

American urban historian

- Born: 1937 (age 88–89)
- Occupation: Urban Historian
- Awards: Guggenheim Fellowship (1973)

Academic background
- Education: Columbia University; Harvard University
- Doctoral advisor: Oscar Handlin

Academic work
- Sub-discipline: Urban history
- Institutions: Massachusetts Institute of Technology

Robert M. Fogelson (born 1937) is an American urban historian. He is an emeritus professor of history at Massachusetts Institute of Technology.

== Biography ==
Fogelson received his B.A. from Columbia University in 1958 and Ph.D. from Harvard University in 1964. His doctoral advisor was Oscar Handlin. Fogelson joined the MIT faculty in 1968 and his scholarship focuses on urban history and urban affairs, including rent control in New York City, the development of suburbs and downtowns, city policing and the decline of non-profit cooperative housing.

Fogelson received a Guggenheim Fellowship in 1973.
