= Chip Jacobs =

American author and journalist

Chip Jacobs is an American author and journalist who has written multiple books of non-fiction, including the social histories Smogtown: The Lung-Burning History of Pollution in Los Angeles (2008) and its follow-up, The People’s Republic of Chemicals (2014). His debut novel, Arroyo (2019), was a Los Angeles Times bestseller.

== Writing ==
=== Non-fiction ===
With fellow investigative journalist William J. Kelly, Jacobs wrote the social history Smogtown: The Lung-Burning History of Pollution in Los Angeles (2008), which Booklist praised as “remarkably entertaining and informative,” As a follow-up, Jacobs and Kelly wrote The People’s Republic of Chemicals (2014), which Kirkus called "hard-hitting" and "[a] scathing denunciation of how America outsourced its industrial capacity to China, a package that included catastrophic pollution."

His dark comedy, true crime book, The Ascension of Jerry (2012), was about a murder trial in 1979 Los Angeles. He also wrote the biography Strange As It Seems: The Impossible Life of Gordon Zahler (2016), which Publishers Weekly called “exceptional” storytelling and a “peculiar page turner."

=== Fiction ===
Jacobs's debut novel, Arroyo (2019), is a work of historical fiction set around construction of Pasadena’s mysterious Colorado Street Bridge in 1913. It was a Los Angeles Times and Southern California Independent Booksellers Association bestseller.

Booklist magazine called Arroyo a "a riveting and enjoyable look at how local myths are constructed, and a vivid depiction of a time and a place that felt full of possibilities.” Library Journal said that Jacobs "handles the historical material superbly, skillfully relating the complicated and tragic story of the" Colorado Street Bridge's "construction while convincingly depicting a variety of famous historical figures.”

== Life ==
Jacobs is from Pasadena, California.

== Select works ==
- Smogtown: The Lung-burning History of Pollution in Los Angeles (2008), with William J. Kelly ISBN 9781585678600
- Wheeling the Deal: the Outrageous Legend of Gordon Zahler, Hollywood's Flashiest Quadriplegic (2008) ISBN 9781933016474
- The Ascension of Jerry: Murder, Hitmen, and the Making of L.A. Muckraker Jerry Schneiderman (2012) ISBN 9780983925545
- The People's Republic of Chemicals (2014), with William J. Kelly ISBN 9781940207544
- Strange as it Seems (2016) ISBN 9781942600329
- Arroyo: A Novel (2019) ISBN 9781644280287
