= Paula Hyman =

American social historian

- Born: September 30, 1946; Boston, Massachusetts, U.S.
- Died: December 15, 2011 (aged 65); New Haven, Connecticut, U.S.
- Education: Radcliffe College (BA); Columbia University (PhD)
- Spouse: Stanley H. Rosenbaum
- Scientific career
- Fields: History, Judaic Studies, Feminism
- Workplaces: Yale University; Columbia University

Paula Hyman (September 30, 1946 – December 15, 2011) was an American social historian who served as the Lucy Moses Professor of Modern Jewish History at Yale University.

She served as the president of the American Academy for Jewish Research from 2004 to 2008. She also was the first female dean of the Seminary College of Jewish Studies at the Jewish Theological Seminary from 1981 to 1986. Hyman was a pioneer for gender equality in Jewish religious practice, helping push for women's ordination as Conservative rabbis. Jewish historian Hasia Diner credits Hyman as the originator of the study of Jewish women’s history.

== Early life and career ==
Paula Ellen Hyman was born in Boston, Massachusetts, on September 30, 1946, to Ida Hyman (née Tatelman) and Sydney Hyman, two first generation Jewish-Americans from Eastern Europe. Ida was of Russian descent and Sydney of Lithuanian.

Hyman was the first of three daughters. Her mother worked as a bookkeeper and was in charge of the home while her father was an office manager. In her childhood household, Jewish culture was integral to family life.

Starting in high school and continuing in early college, Hyman studied Hebrew and classic Jewish works at Hebrew Teachers College in Boston, where she earned a Bachelors of Jewish Education in 1966. In 1968, she graduated summa cum laude with a B.A. from Radcliffe College. While at Radcliffe, Hyman was mentored by Jewish historians Yosef Hayim Yerushalmi and Isadore Twersky.

After Radcliffe, Hyman went on to do post-graduate work at Columbia University starting in 1972, where she would later be a professor, and earn her Ph.D. in History in 1975. Hyman’s Columbia doctoral dissertation was titled From Dreyfus to Vichy: The Remaking of French Jewry, 1906–1939 and was published by Columbia University Press in 1979.

The content of her doctoral dissertation focused on Eastern European Jews immigrating to France up until World War II and how that changed French Jewry. This book was a finalist in the National Jewish Book Award competition in History.

While in graduate school, Hyman co-authored a book titled The Jewish Woman in America with Charlotte Baum and Sonya Michel. The book earned her another Jewish Book Award in 1998 for Women's Studies.

After graduating from Columbia, Hyman was a professor there and later at the Jewish Theological Seminary of America. There, she was the first female dean of the Seminary College of Jewish Studies. She served in this position until 1986, when she moved to Yale University.

== Later life and death ==
Over the years, Hyman became known as a prominent advocate for gender equality in Jewish religious life, both in her professional and personal lives. At Yale, Hyman was the Lucy Moses Professor of Modern Jewish History and served as the chair of the Program in Judaic Studies for over 10 years. This appointment made her the first woman to head a Jewish Studies program at a prominent university. Over the course of her career Hyman authored ten books and sixty articles.

Additionally, Hyman was the President of the American Association for Jewish Research from 2004 to 2008, the co-chair of the academic council of the National Foundation for Jewish Culture from 1995 to 2002, a member of the executive board of the Association for Jewish Studies (AJS) and the Leo Baeck Institute, while being on the editorial board for various journals including Association for Jewish Studies Review, Jewish Social Studies, Journal for the Feminist Study of Religion, andYIVO Annual. Additionally, she received the Lifetime Achievement Award in Historical Studies from the National Foundation for Jewish Culture. For over two decades she edited The Modern Jewish Experience from the Indiana University Press.

She was the recipient of various honors and awards: a 1999 National Jewish Book Award, a 2004 Achievement Award in Historical Studies from the National Foundation for Jewish Culture, and honorary degrees from the Jewish Theological Seminary of America in 2000, the Hebrew Union College in 2002, and the Hebrew College in 2010.

Hyman died on December 15, 2011, from a long fight with breast cancer, which she was very open about. She is survived by her husband, Dr. Stanley Rosenbaum, her two daughters, Judith and Adina, two grandchildren, Ma’ayan and Aviv, her mother Ida, and her two sisters, Merle and Toby. After her death, Hyman was commemorated by the commencement of the Paula Hyman Oral History Project, created in part by the Women’s Caucus of the AJS. Hyman was part of this caucus until the time of her death. The goal of this oral history was to conserve the reflections of the founding members of the caucus. Additionally, Hyman was commemorated by the creation of the Paula E. Hyman Mentoring Program, which selects every year young women scholars of Jewish women's and genders studies and pairs them with older mentors in the same field.

== Activism ==
In 1971, Hyman helped found Ezrat Nashim, a Jewish activist group whose goal was the ordination of women as Conservative rabbis and cantors, a foreshadowing of her later position as a champion of gender equality in religious Jewish life. While at Columbia, Hyman and other Jewish feminists wrote a manifesto to call for the ordination of women rabbis and cantors in Conservative Judaism, which they then delivered to hundreds of conservative rabbis at a Rabbinical Assembly. The title of this manifesto was “Jewish Women Call for Change.”

In both her personal and professional life, Hyman championed feminist ideology and sought to end political and historical sexism. Additionally, when she became the first woman to join organizations in the United States, Israel, and Europe, she would be certain to attain the participation of other women, helping further her activist identity.

== Research interests and reception ==
Hyman's research interests included topics in modern European and American Jewish history, with a special emphasis on the history of women and gender. Her work can be summed up as the interaction of Judaism and feminism in various countries. Some of her particular interests are the way in which French Jewry changed from the Dreyfus Affair to the present, and how Eastern European Jewish women immigrants interacted with work outside the home. On the latter topic, Hyman is known for her works on Jewish women in New York as activists in events such as the kosher meat boycott of 1902 and the New York rent strike of 1907. Her interest in such activism finds its base in her growing up in the 1960s, an era known for its social changes including a widely-fought feminist movement.

Hyman was recognized as one of the founders of Jewish women's studies and was seen as a role model for her colleagues and students for her dedication to this field. This field finds one of its starts in Hyman's The Jewish Woman in America. In addition, she was seen as a changing force in how the modern Jewish experience is understood by scholars and laymen alike. This shift included a newfound focus on the daily ins and outs of American and European Jewish life as well as exposing the lives of often overlooked populations, such as women, through a use of popular and archival sources. After Hyman's death, Nashim: A Journal of Jewish Women's Studies and Gender Issues dedicated issue twenty-two of their journal to Hyman.

== Selected works ==
- "Joseph Salvador: Proto-Zionist or Apologist for Assimilation?" Jewish Social Studies Vol. 34, No. 1, January 1972
- The Jewish Woman in America, co-authored with Charlotte Baum and Sonya Michel. New York: 1976
- From Dreyfus to Vichy: The Remaking of French Jewry, 1906–1939. New York: 1979
- “Immigrant Women and Consumer Protest: The New York Kosher Meat Boycott of 1902.” American Jewish History (1980); 91–105
- "The History of European Jewry: Recent Trends in the Literature" The Journal of Modern History Vol. 54, No. 2, June 1982
- The Jewish Family: Myths and Reality, edited with Steven M. Cohen. New York: 1986
- “From City to Suburb: Temple Mishkan Tefila of Boston.” In The American Synagogue: A Sanctuary Transformed, edited by Jack Wertheimer, 85–105. Cambridge and New York: 1987
- "The Dreyfus Affair: The Visual and the Historical," The Journal of Modern History Vol. 61, No. 1, March 1989
- “The Modern Jewish Family: Image and Reality.” In The Jewish Family: Metaphor and Memory, edited by David Kraemer. New York and Oxford: 1989; 179–193
- “The Ideological Transformation of Modern Jewish Historiography.” In The State of Jewish Studies, edited by Shaye J. D. Cohen and Edward L. Greenstein, 143–157, Detroit: 1990
- The Emancipation of the Jews of Alsace: Acculturation and Tradition in the Nineteenth Century. New Haven: 1991
- “The Dynamics of Social History.” Studies in Contemporary Jewry 10 (1994): 93–111;
- Gender and Assimilation in Modern Jewish History: The Roles and Representation of Women. Seattle: 1995
- Jewish Women in America: An Historical Encyclopedia, co-edited with Deborah Dash Moore, 2 vols. New York: 1997
- The Jews of Modern France. Berkeley and Los Angeles: 1998
- “The Jewish Body Politic: Gendered Politics in the Early Twentieth Century.” Nashim 2 (1999): 37–51
- “National Contexts, East European Immigrants, and Jewish Identity: A Comparative Analysis.” In National Variations in Modern Jewish Identity, edited by Steven M. Cohen and Gabriel Horenczyk, 109–123. Albany: 1999
- My Life as a Radical Jewish Woman: Memoirs of a Zionist Feminist in Poland, by Puah Rakovsky, edited with an introduction and notes. Bloomington: 2001
- “The Transnational Experience of Jewish Women in Western and Central Europe after World War I.” In European Jews and Jewish Europeans between the Two World Wars, edited by Raya Cohen, 21–33 (Michael, vol. 16, 2004)
- “Interpretive Contest: Art Critics and Jewish Historians.” In Text and Context: Essays in Modern Jewish History and Historiography in Honor of Ismar Schorsch, edited by Eli Lederhendler and Jack Wertheimer, 74–94. New York: 2005.
- Jewish Women in Eastern Europe, co-edited with ChaeRan Freeze and Antony Polonsky. Polin, Volume 18, 2005.
- "Recent Trends in European Jewish Historiography," The Journal of Modern History Vol. 77, No. 2, June 2005
