= Deborah Dash Moore =

American historian

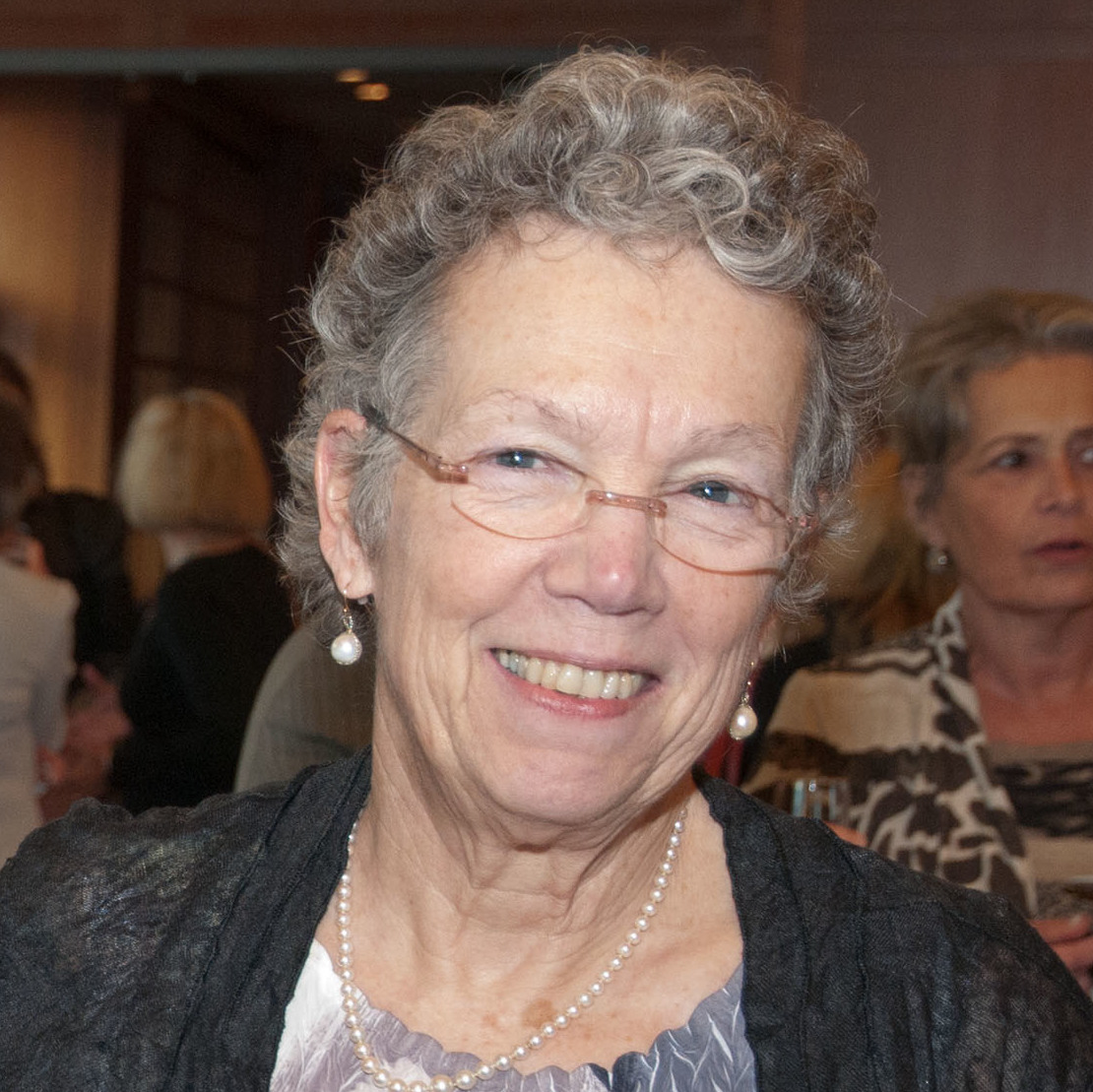
- Born: 1946 (age 79–80); New York City, New York, United States
- Employer: University of Michigan

Deborah Dash Moore (born 1946) is an American historian, the former director of the Frankel Center for Judaic Studies, and a Frederick G.L. Huetwell Professor of History and Judaic Studies at the University of Michigan in Ann Arbor, Michigan.

== Early life and education ==
Deborah Dash Moore earned her bachelor's degree - BA magna cum laude, with honors in history - from Brandeis University. She continued her education at Columbia University, receiving her M.A. in history in 1968 and her Ph.D. in history in 1975.

== Career and publications ==
Moore taught for many years at Vassar College in Poughkeepsie, New York. While there she served intermittently as head of Religious Studies and helped found a program in Jewish Studies. At Vassar, Deborah Dash Moore wrote and co-edited numerous books, articles and collections. She was a highly regarded educator and classroom professor in addition to her scholarship.

Her first book, At Home in America: Second Generation New York Jews (1981), explores how the children of immigrants created an ethnic world that blended elements of Jewish and American culture into a vibrant urban society. To the Golden Cities: Pursuing the American Jewish Dream in Miami and L. A. (1994) follows those big city Jews who chose to move to new homes after World War II and examines the type of communities and politics that flourished in these rapidly growing centers.

Issues of leadership, authority and accomplishment have also engaged her attention, first in B'nai B'rith and the Challenge of Ethnic Leadership (1981), and more recently in the award-winning two-volume Jewish Women in America: An Historical Encyclopedia (1997), which she edited with Paula Hyman.

Her 2004 book, GI Jews: How World War II Changed a Generation, charts the lives of fifteen young Jewish men as they faced military service and tried to make sense of its demands, simultaneously wrestling with what it meant to be an American and a Jew. GI Jews, The Washington Post Best Book of the Year, portrays the costs of a conflict that was at once physical, emotional, and spiritual.

In 2008, Moore published American Jewish Identity Politics (University of Michigan Press), a collection of essays by such notable Jewish studies scholars as Hasia Diner, Jonathan Sarna, and Paula Hyman.

In 2011, her book Gender & Jewish History (Indiana University Press), written with co-editor Marion Kaplan in honor of historian Paula Hyman, was awarded the National Jewish Book Award in the category of Anthologies and Collections.

In September 2012, NYU Press published a three-volume series edited by Moore, City of Promises: A History of the Jews of New York. This history was selected for the National Jewish Book Award. In 2017, NYU Press published Jewish New York: The Remarkable Story of a City and a People, based on the 2012 three-volume series.

In spring 2016, Moore was named Editor-in-Chief of the Posen Library of Jewish Culture and Civilization, a ten-volume anthology of Jewish literature, artwork, and artifacts published by Yale University Press. Moore was the co-editor, with Nurith Gertz, of Volume 10 of the Posen Library, which covered the period from 1973 to 2005.

Moore's book Walkers in the City: Jewish Street Photographers of Midcentury New York was published in 2023 by Three Hills, a trade imprint of Cornell University Press. This book received the National Jewish Book Award in the category of American Jewish Studies.

== Awards and honors ==
- National Jewish Book Award for City of Promises, 2012
- Lee Max Friedman Award Medal in teaching
- National Jewish Book Award in the Anthologies and Collections category for Gender & Jewish History, 2012
- Marshall Sklare Award, 2006
- The Washington Post Best Book of the Year, 2005
- Saul Viener Prize for Best Book in American Jewish History for GI Jews: How World War II Changed a Generation, 2003–2004,
- Honorary Doctor of Humane Letters, awarded by Reconstructionist Rabbinical College, June 2001
- National Jewish Book Award for best book in Women's Studies for Jewish Women in America: An Historical Encyclopedia, 1997
- Choice Outstanding Academic Book in 1998, Jewish Women in America: An Historical Encyclopedia, 1997
- Dartmouth Medal of the American Library Association in the best reference work category for Jewish Women in America: An Historical Encyclopedia, 1997
- Association of Jewish Librarians reference book award for Jewish Women in America: An Historical Encyclopedia, 1997
