= To the Golden Cities =

1994 book written by Deborah Dash Moore

To the Golden Cities: Pursuing the American Jewish Dream in Miami and L.A.
- Author: Deborah Dash Moore
- Language: English
- Genre: Non-fiction
- Publisher: The Free Press
- Publication date: April 1994
- Publication place: United States

To the Golden Cities: Pursuing the American Jewish Dream in Miami and L.A. is an April 1994 book written by Deborah Dash Moore and published by The Free Press. It discusses the Jewish communities that formed in Los Angeles and Miami in the post-World War II period. Moore argued that the migration to new communities helped American Jews find their identities and that they "reinvented" themselves.

== Background ==
Jenna Weissman Joselit of the New York University Department of Liberal Studies described Moore as "one of this generation's foremost historians of America's Jews". At the time of publication Moore was Vassar College's American culture program director.

Moore characterizes Jews who moved into newly established cities; which had a lack of established culture and tradition, mild climates, and lifestyles perceived as being casual; as "permanent tourists". The references include monographs and interviews.

Raymond A. Mohl of American Jewish History wrote that the oral history and archival research supporting the book serves as its "great strength". Carol R. Glatt of the Veterans Affairs Medical Center Library, Philadelphia wrote that the book's documentation was "solid".

== Content ==
The book covers the post-World War II period up until the early 1960s.

Stephen J. Whitfield of Brandeis University stated that the book focuses more on similarities between Los Angeles and Miami rather than differences; he argued that "southern regionalists" may dispute the technique, but that "her approach is compelling when framed within Jewish history".

Joselit wrote that Moore emphasizes that "the Jewish historical experience, from Minsk to Miami, is grounded less in the particularities of place-in the "style of the landscape"-than in its promise" and that "the sense of possibility" appears throughout the work.

Moore stated that Jewish culture continued to thrive in Los Angeles and Miami even though some individuals decades earlier predicted it would evaporate, and therefore she argued that Jewish culture will continue to be intact.

== Reception ==
Glatt wrote that the book had a "fluid, readable style" and that "This seminal work will be widely read."

Joselit wrote that much of the phenomena described in the book "have as much to do with postwar America more generally than with the specific geographical contours of Miami and Los Angeles".

Mohl wrote that To the Golden Cities was overall "an excellent book, deeply researched and extremely readable", but he took issue with the book's central thesis that the new Jewish society formed in Miami and Los Angeles, arguing that it also could have formed in suburbs of older cities and that social and political movements divided Jews in the North, not only in the South.

Eugene Patron of The Forward wrote that the book "for the most part [...] is an engaging exploration of what has been an untold story" although "an overload of details" sometimes "bogs down" the book.

June Sochen of the Northeastern Illinois University Department of History wrote that "has done a fine job of synthesizing" its sources "to produce the first important analysis of this migration" and that the book "will be the foundation upon which future studies of the subject are built."

Whitfield stated that the book was "the best social history of Miami Jewry" because To The Golden Cities "is also the only serious history of that community" and therefore giving this distinction would be "faint praise". Whitfield praised the "clear and unobtrusive" design and prose and the research undertaken, but he argued that the phenomena happening in Miami and Los Angeles also happened in the north and that the events reflect broader Jewish history rather than specific histories of the U.S. Sunbelt.

== See also ==
- History of the Jews in Los Angeles
