= 1971 in Michigan =

- Decades: 1950s; 1960s; 1970s; 1980s; 1990s
- See also: History of Michigan; Historical outline of Michigan; List of years in Michigan; 1971 in the United States

Events from the year 1971 in Michigan.

The Associated Press (AP) selected the top 10 news stories in Michigan as follows:

1. Court-ordered busing in the Pontiac public schools (AP-1);
2. An order by federal judge Stephen Roth finding that the Detroit public schools were segregated by law, triggering concerns that he might order cross-district busing as a remedy (AP-2);
3. The Michigan Legislature's reducing the age of adulthood to 18 (AP-3);
4. A Supreme Court decision banning public aid to parochial schools (AP-4);
5. The Michigan Legislature's adoption of a 50% increase in the state income tax (AP-5);
6. Gov. William Milliken's plan to change the source of education funding by cutting local property taxes and raising the state income tax (AP-6);
7. The Michigan Legislature's reduction of penalties for drug possession (AP-7);
8. The debate concerning the state's budget which totaled more than $2 billion (AP-8);
9. An explosion on December 11 in a water tunnel being built under Lake Huron near Port Huron resulted when methane gas built up and caused the deaths of 21 workers (AP-9); and
10. A court challenge to the constitutionality of the property tax as a mechanism for funding education (AP-10).

The AP also selected the state's top 10 sports stories as follows:

1. The death of Detroit Lions wide receiver Chuck Hughes after collapsing on the field with a heart attack during a game;
2. The retirement of Gordie Howe after 25 years with the Detroit Red Wings;
3. The Lions' release of Alex Karras despite having two years remaining on his contract;
4. Mickey Lolich winning 25 games and finishing second in voting for the Cy Young Award;
5. The 1971 Michigan Wolverines football team compiling a perfect 11-0 record during the regular season;
6. The 1970–71 Detroit Red Wings finishing in last place and the resignation of Ned Harkness as general manager;
7. Michigan State University athletic director Biggie Munn suffering a heart attack the week before the Michigan–Michigan State football rivalry game;
8. The resignation of Butch Van Breda Kolff as head coach of the Detroit Pistons and the hiring of Earl Lloyd as the first African-American coach in Detroit professional sports history;
9. The 1971 Major League Baseball All-Star Game held at Tiger Stadium in Detroit and home runs in that game by Reggie Jackson, Harmon Killebrew, and Frank Robinson; and
10. Eric Allen who set an NCAA single-game rushing record as halfback for the 1971 Michigan State Spartans football team.

== Office holders ==
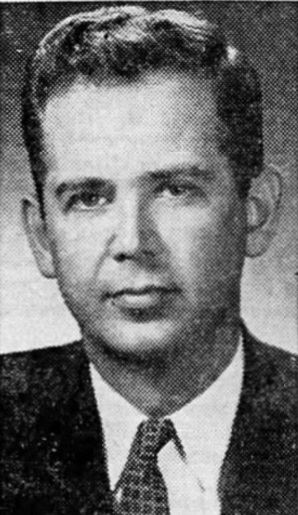
Gov. Milliken

=== State office holders ===
- Governor of Michigan: William Milliken (Republican)
- Lieutenant Governor of Michigan: James H. Brickley (Republican)
- Michigan Attorney General: Frank J. Kelley (Democrat)
- Michigan Secretary of State: Richard H. Austin (Democrat)
- Speaker of the Michigan House of Representatives: William A. Ryan (Democrat)
- Majority Leader of the Michigan Senate: Robert VanderLaan (Republican)
- Chief Justice, Michigan Supreme Court: Thomas E. Brennan/Thomas M. Kavanagh

=== Mayors of major cities ===
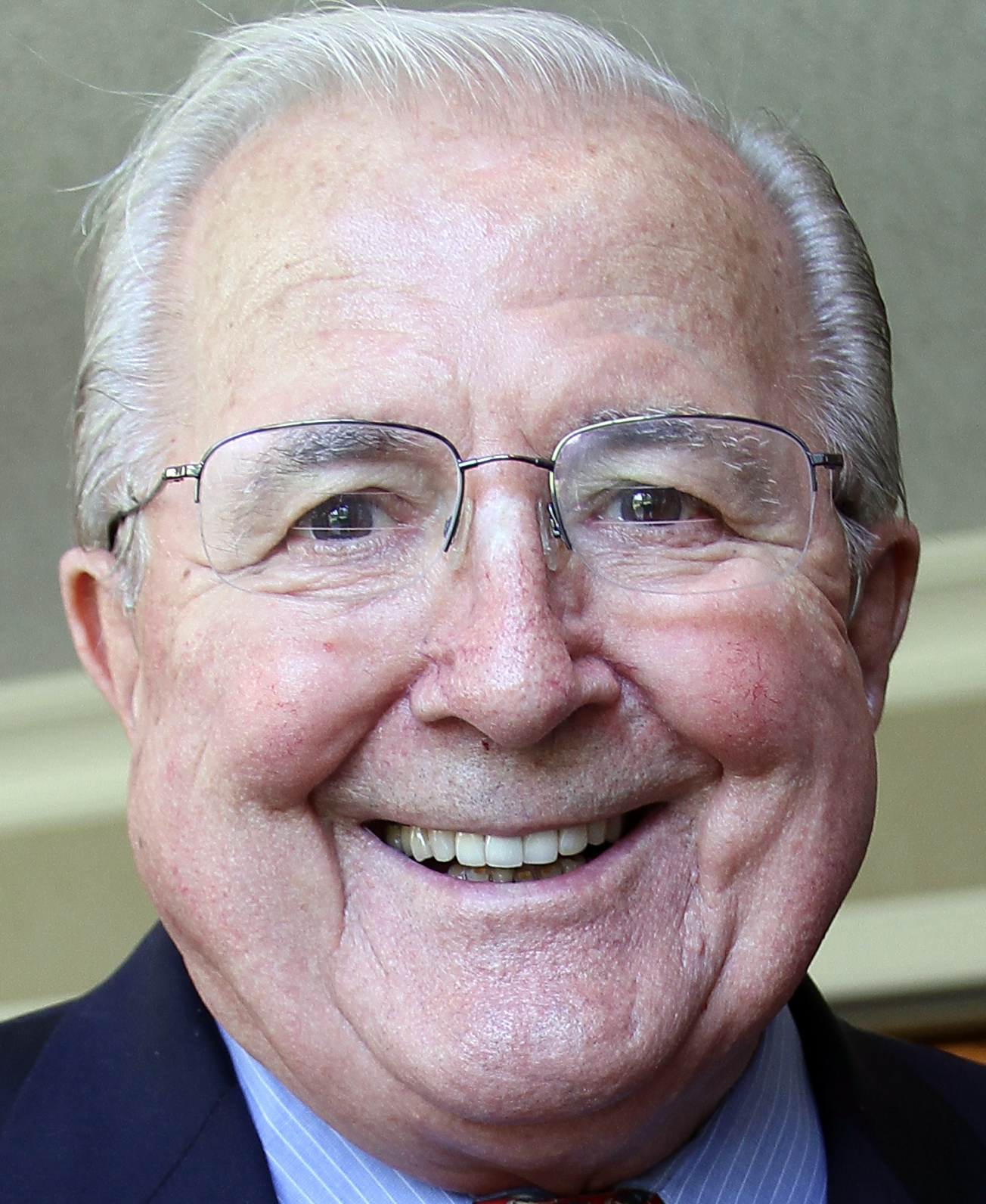
Mayor Gribbs

- Mayor of Detroit: Roman Gribbs
- Mayor of Grand Rapids: Robert Boelens/Lyman S. Parks
- Mayor of Warren, Michigan: Ted Bates
- Mayor of Sterling Heights, Michigan: Gerald N. Donovan
- Mayor of Flint: Francis E. Limmer
- Mayor of Lansing: Gerald W. Graves
- Mayor of Dearborn: Orville L. Hubbard
- Mayor of Ann Arbor: Robert J. Harris (Democrat)
- Mayor of Saginaw: Warren C. Light/Paul H. Wendler

=== Federal office holders ===
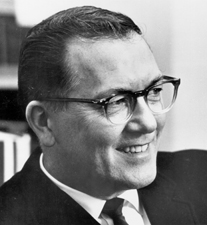
Sen. Griffin

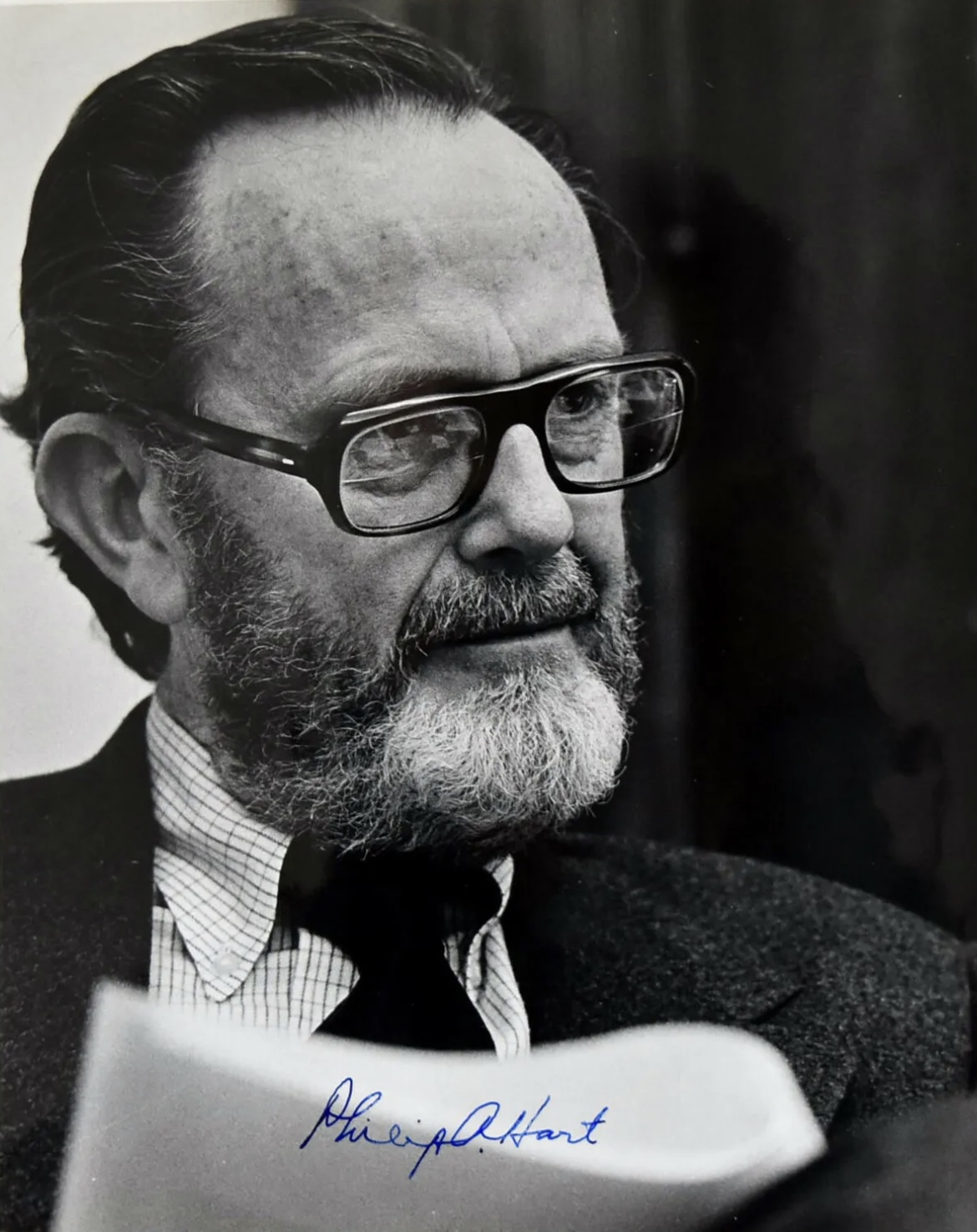
Sen. Hart

- U.S. Senator from Michigan: Robert P. Griffin (Republican)
- U.S. Senator from Michigan: Philip Hart (Democrat)
- House District 1: John Conyers (Democrat)
- House District 2: Marvin L. Esch (Republican)
- House District 3: Garry E. Brown (Republican)
- House District 4: J. Edward Hutchinson (Republican)
- House District 5: Gerald Ford (Republican)
- House District 6: Charles E. Chamberlain (Republican)
- House District 7: Donald W. Riegle Jr. (Republican)
- House District 8: R. James Harvey (Republican)
- House District 9: Guy Vander Jagt (Republican)
- House District 10: Elford Albin Cederberg (Republican)
- House District 11: Philip Ruppe (Republican)
- House District 12: James G. O'Hara (Democrat)
- House District 13: Charles Diggs (Democrat)
- House District 14: Lucien N. Nedzi (Democrat)
- House District 15: William D. Ford (Democrat)
- House District 16: John Dingell Jr. (Democrat)
- House District 17: Martha Griffiths (Democrat)
- House District 18: William Broomfield (Republican)
- House District 19: Jack H. McDonald (Republican)

== Population ==
In the 1970 United States census, Michigan was recorded as having a population of 8,875,083 persons, ranking as the seventh most populous state in the country. By 1980, the state's population had grown 4.4% to 9,262,078 persons.

=== Cities ===
The following is a list of cities in Michigan with a population of at least 70,000 based on 1970 U.S. Census data. Historic census data from 1960 and 1980 is included to reflect trends in population increases or decreases. Cities that are part of the Detroit metropolitan area are shaded in tan.

1970 Rank	City	County	1960 Pop.	1970 Pop.	1980 Pop.	Change 1970-80
1	Detroit	Wayne	1,670,144	1,514,063	1,203,368	−20.5% ▼
2	Grand Rapids	Kent	177,313	197,649	181,843	−8.0% ▼
3	Flint	Genesee	196,940	193,317	159,611	−17.4% ▼
4	Warren	Macomb	89,246	179,260	161,134	−10.1% ▼
5	Lansing	Ingham	107,807	131,403	130,414	−0.8% ▼
6	Livonia	Wayne	66,702	110,109	104,814	−4.8% ▼
7	Dearborn	Wayne	112,007	104,199	90,660	−13.0% ▼
8	Ann Arbor	Washtenaw	67,340	100,035	107,969	7.9% ▲
9	Saginaw	Saginaw	98,265	91,849	77,508	−15.6% ▼
10	St. Clair Shores	Macomb	76,657	88,093	76,210	−13.5% ▼
11	Westland	Wayne	60,743	86,749	84,603	−2.5% ▼
12	Royal Oak	Oakland	80,612	86,238	70,893	−17.8% ▼
13	Kalamazoo	Kalamazoo	82,089	85,555	79,722	−6.8% ▼
14	Pontiac	Oakland	82,233	85,279	76,715	−10.0% ▼
15	Dearborn Heights	Wayne	61,118	80,069	67,706	−15.4% ▼
16	Taylor	Wayne	na	70,020	77,568	10.8% ▲

=== Counties ===
The following is a list of counties in Michigan with populations of at least 120,000 based on 1970 U.S. Census data. Historic census data from 1960 and 1980 are included to reflect trends in population increases or decreases. Counties that are part of the Detroit metropolitan area are shaded in tan.

1970 Rank	County	Largest city	1960 Pop.	1970 Pop.	1980 Pop.	Change 1970-80
1	Wayne	Detroit	2,666,297	2,666,751	2,337,891	−12.3% ▼
2	Oakland	Pontiac	690,259	907,871	1,011,793	11.4% ▲
3	Macomb	Warren	405,804	625,309	694,600	11.1% ▲
4	Genesee	Flint	374,313	444,341	450,449	1.4% ▲
5	Kent	Grand Rapids	363,187	411,044	444,506	8.1% ▲
6	Ingham	Lansing	211,296	261,039	275,520	5.5% ▲
7	Washtenaw	Ann Arbor	172,440	234,103	264,748	13.1% ▲
8	Saginaw	Saginaw	190,752	219,743	228,059	3.8% ▲
9	Kalamazoo	Kalamazoo	169,712	201,550	212,378	5.4% ▲
10	Berrien	Benton Harbor	149,865	163,875	171,276	4.5% ▲
11	Muskegon	Muskegon	129,943	157,426	157,589	0.1% ▲
12	Jackson	Jackson	131,994	143,274	151,495	5.7% ▲
13	Calhoun	Battle Creek	138,858	141,963	141,557	−0.3% ▼
14	Ottawa	Holland	98,719	128,181	157,174	22.6% ▲
15	St. Clair	Port Huron	107,201	120,175	138,802	15.5% ▲
16	Monroe	Monroe	101,120	118,479	134,659	13.7% ▲
17	Bay	Bay City	107,042	117,339	119,881	2.2% ▲

== Sports ==
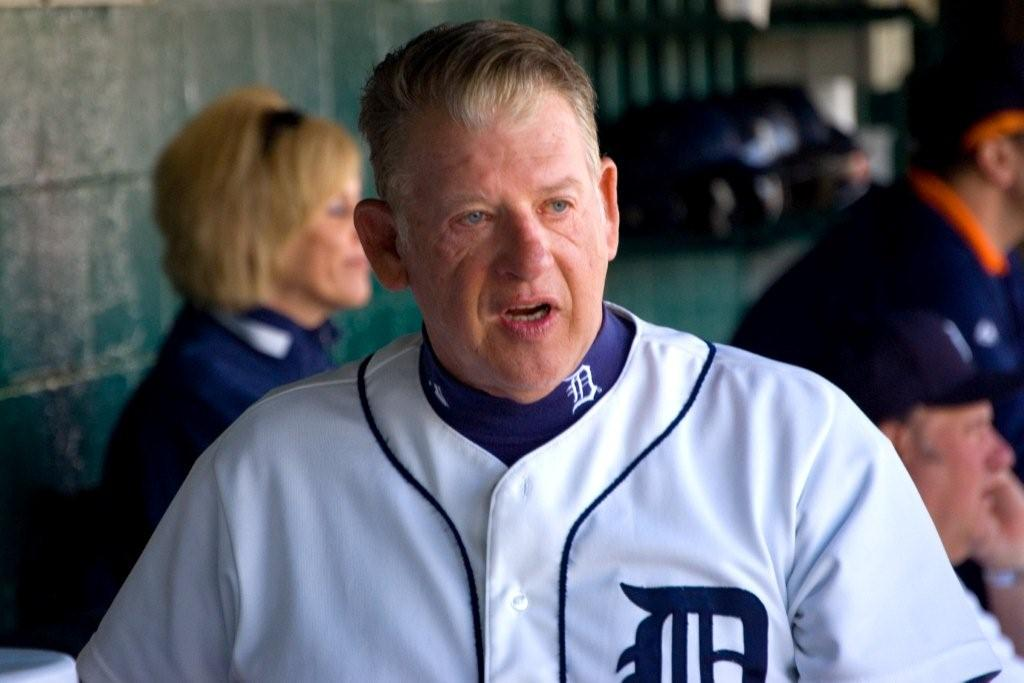
Mickey Lolich

=== Baseball ===
- 1971 Detroit Tigers season – Under manager Billy Martin, the Tigers compiled a 91–71 record and finished second in the American League East. The team's statistical leaders included Al Kaline with a .294 batting average, Norm Cash with 32 home runs and 91 RBIs, Mickey Lolich with 25 wins, and Fred Scherman with a 2.71 earned run average. Lolich finished second in voting for the Cy Young Award.
- 1971 Michigan Wolverines baseball team - Under head coach Moby Benedict, the Wolverines compiled a 23–13–1 record and finished second in the Big Ten Conference.

=== American football ===
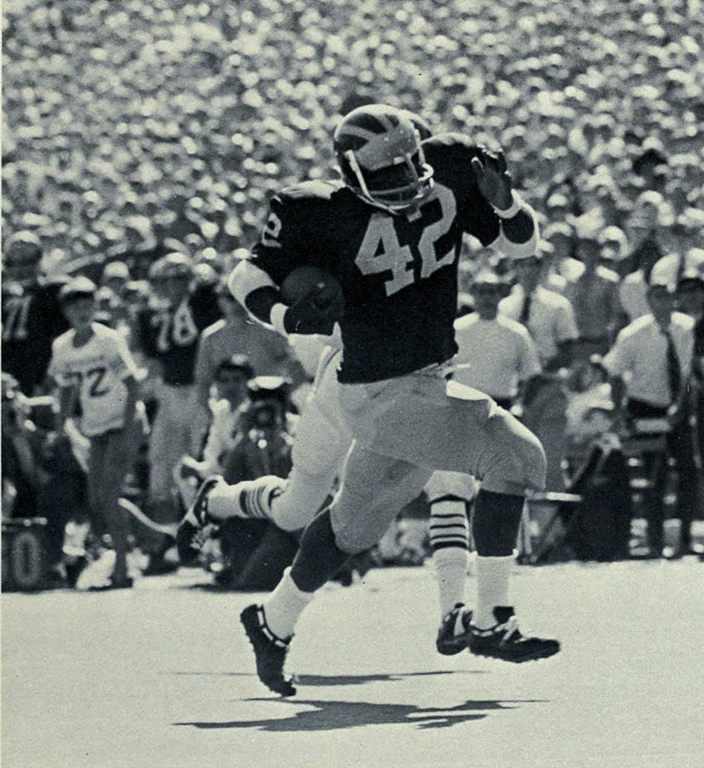
Billy Taylor

- 1971 Detroit Lions season – The Lions, under head coach Joe Schmidt, compiled a 7–6–1 record and finished in second place in the NFL's Central Division. The team's statistical leaders included Greg Landry with 2,237 passing yards, Steve Owens with 1,035 rushing yards, Earl McCullouch with 552 receiving yards, and Errol Mann with 103 points scored.
- 1971 Michigan Wolverines football team – Under head coach Bo Schembechler, the Wolverines compiled a perfect 11–0 record before losing to Stanford in the 1972 Rose Bowl. The Wolverines were ranked No. 6 in the final AP Poll. The team's statistical leaders included Tom Slade with 364 passing yards, Billy Taylor with 1,297 rushing yards and 78 points scored, and Glenn Doughty with 203 receiving yards.
- 1971 Michigan State Spartans football team – Under head coach Duffy Daugherty, the Spartans compiled a 6–5 record.

=== Basketball ===
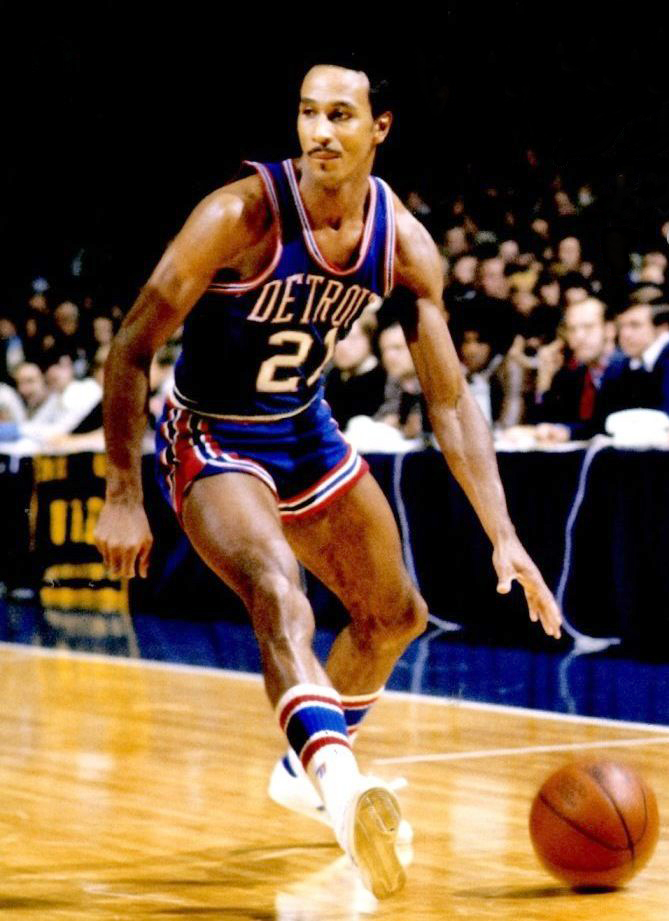
Dave Bing

- 1970–71 Detroit Pistons season – Under head coach Butch Van Breda Kolff, the Pistons compiled a 45–37 record. The team's statistical leaders included Dave Bing with 2,213 points and 408 assists and Otto Moore with 700 rebounds.
- 1970–71 Michigan Wolverines men's basketball team – Under head coach Johnny Orr, the Wolverines compiled a 19–7 record and finished second in the Big Ten Conference. The team's statistical leaders included Henry Wilmore with 650 points and Ken Brady with 267 rebounds.
- 1970–71 Michigan State Spartans men's basketball team – Under head coach Gus Ganakas, the Spartans compiled a 10–14 record.
- 1970–71 Detroit Titans men's basketball team – The Titans compiled a 14–12 record under head coach Jim Harding.

=== Ice hockey ===
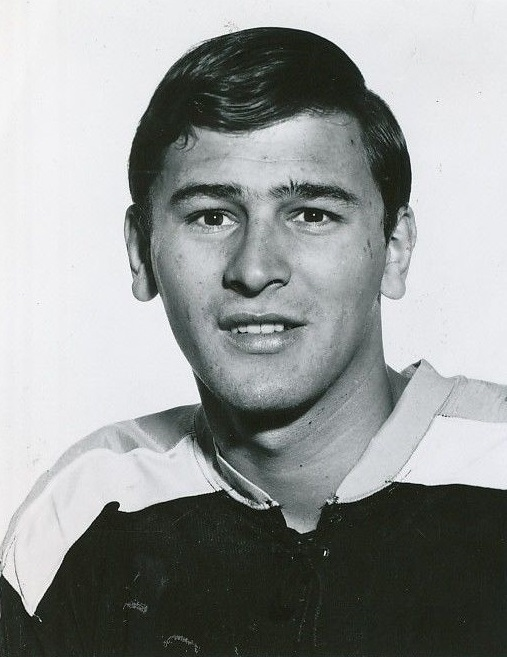
Tom Webster

- 1970–71 Detroit Red Wings season – Under head coaches Ned Harkness and Doug Barkley, the Red Wings compiled a 22–45–11 record and finished seventh in the National Hockey League's East Division. Tom Webster led the team with 30 goals, 37 assists, and 67 points scored. The team's regular goaltenders were Roy Edwards and Jim Rutherford.
- 1970–71 Michigan Tech Huskies men's ice hockey team – Under head coach John MacInnes, Michigan Tech compiled a 25–6–2 record.
- 1970–71 Michigan Wolverines men's ice hockey season – Under head coach Al Renfrew, the Wolverines compiled a 9–21 record.
- 1970–71 Michigan State Spartans men's ice hockey team – Under head coach Amo Bessone, the Spartans compiled a 19–12 record.

=== Golf ===
- Buick Open –
- Michigan Open –

=== Boat racing ===
- Port Huron to Mackinac Boat Race –
- Spirit of Detroit race –
- APBA Gold Cup –

=== Other ===
- 1971 NCAA Indoor Track and Field Championships – The fifth annual NCAA indoor championships were held at Cobo Arena in Detroit in March; Villanova won the team championship.
- Yankee 600 -

== Music ==
Several songs performed by Michigan acts and/or recorded in Michigan ranked on the Billboard Year-End Hot 100 singles of 1971, including the following:

- "Just My Imagination (Running Away with Me)" by The Temptations (No. 9);
- "What's Going On" by Marvin Gaye (No. 21), recorded at Hitsville U.S.A. in Detroit;
- "If You Really Love Me" by Stevie Wonder (No. 48);
- "Spanish Harlem" by Aretha Franklin (No. 49);
- "Bridge Over Troubled Water by Aretha Franklin (No. 52);
- "Draggin' the Line" by Tommy James (No. 54);
- "Mercy Mercy Me (The Ecology)" by Marvin Gaye (No. 62), recorded at Hitsville U.S.A.; and
- "I Just Want to Celebrate" by Rare Earth (No. 66).

Albums released by Michigan acts and/or recorded in Michigan in 1971 included the following:

== Chronology of events ==
=== December ===
- December 11 - An explosion in a water tunnel being built under Lake Huron near Port Huron resulted when methane gas built up and caused the deaths of 21 workers.

== Births ==
- January 17 - Kid Rock, recording artist, in Detroit
- February 2 - Jase Bolger, 71st Speaker of the Michigan House of Representatives (2011-2014), in Grand Rapids
- August 23 - Gretchen Whitmer, 49th Governor of Michigan, in Lansing

=== Gallery of 1971 births ===
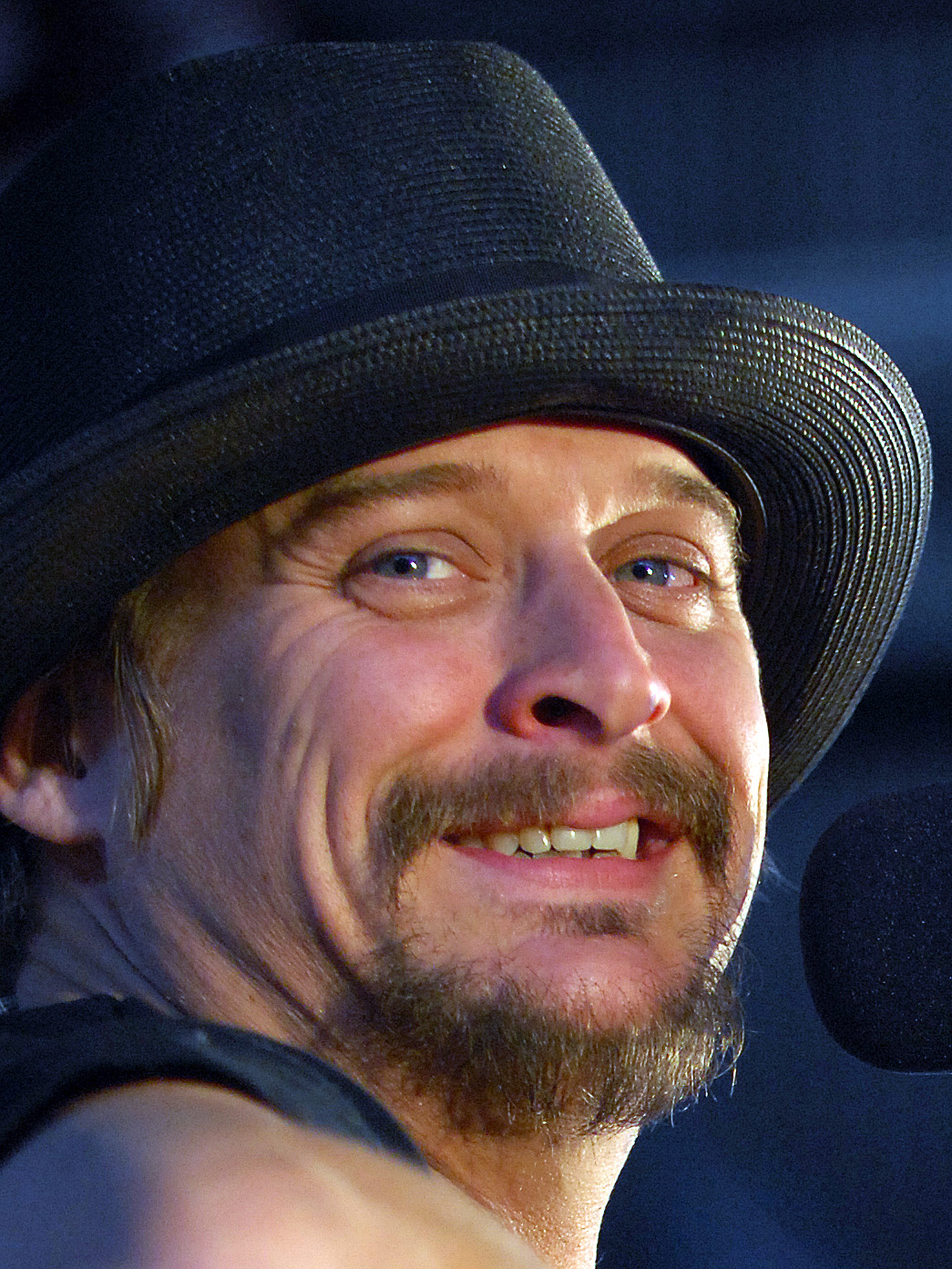
Kid Rock

== Deaths ==
- February 8, Harry Kelly, 39th Governor of Michigan (1943-1947), at age 75 in West Palm Beach, Florida

== See also ==
- History of Michigan
- History of Detroit
