= 1970 in Michigan =

- Decades: 1950s; 1960s; 1970s; 1980s; 1990s
- See also: History of Michigan; Historical outline of Michigan; List of years in Michigan; 1970 in the United States

Events from the year 1970 in Michigan.

The Associated Press (AP) and United Press International (UPI) each selected the state's top news stories as follows:

1. The controversy over public funding to parochial schools, including the Michigan Legislature's enacting of a measure granting state aid and a subsequent petition drive and constitutional amendment prohibiting such aid (AP-1, UPI-1);
2. Contract negotiations between the United Auto Workers (UAW) and automobile manufacturers and a 67-day strike against General Motors that causes widespread layoffs and budget cuts (AP-2 [strike], AP-7 [effects of strike on state economy], UPI-2 [new contracts and GM strike]);
3. The trial and conviction of John Norman Collins for killing Eastern Michigan University student Karen Sue Beineman, one of the Michigan murders (AP-3, UPI-3);
4. The death of Walter Reuther and his wife in a plane crash on May 9 at Pellston, Michigan (AP-4, UPI-5);
5. The November 1970 elections in which William Milliken was elected Governor and Philip Hart was re-elected as U.S. Senator (AP-5, UPI-4);
6. The multiple suspensions of Denny McLain and his later trade to the Washington Senators (AP-6, UPI-7);
7. The discovery of mercury in Lake St. Clair fish and the Michigan Legislature's passage of a law allowing private citizens to sue polluters (AP-8 [mercury], AP-12 [legislation], UPI-6 [both]);
8. The Goose Lake International Music Festival held from August 7 to 9 with widespread drug use (AP-9, UPI-8);
9. A Supreme Court decision requiring public schools to provide free textbooks (AP-11, UPI-9); and
10. (tie) The kidnap and murder of Laurie Murningham and austerity measures adopted by the Michigan Legislature (UPI-10).

The AP and UPI also selected the state's top sports stories as follows:

1. Denny McLain who was suspended in connection with a gambling controversy and then traded to the Washington Senators on October 9 (AP-1 [suspension], AP-8 [trade], UPI-1 [both]);
2. The Detroit Tigers replacing Mayo Smith with Billy Martin as the team's manager (AP-6, UPI-2);
3. The 1969 Michigan Wolverines football team's 10–3 loss to USC in the 1970 Rose Bowl, head coach Bo Schembechler's heart attack prior to the game, and his recovery from the heart attack (AP-3, UPI-3 [Rose Bowl] and UPI-8 [recovery from heart attack]);
4. The 1970 Detroit Lions' finishing their season with five consecutive victories and their best record (10–4) since 1962 (AP-2, UPI-4);
5. The 1970 Michigan Wolverines football team's winning its first nine games before losing to Ohio State, 20–9, on November 21 (AP-5, UPI-5);
6. The Detroit Pistons' signing of their No. 1 draft pick Bob Lanier and then starting their 1970–71 season with a 12–1 record and 26–14 at the end of 1970 (AP-4 [both], UPI-7 [signing Lanier] and UPI-9 [fast start]);
7. Ralph Simpson's decision to quit the Michigan State Spartans men's basketball team to play professional basketball for the Denver Rockets of the American Basketball Association (AP-7, UPI-6);
8. The 1970 Detroit Tigers' collapse during the last part of the season, compiling a 9–26 record from August 25 to September 29 (AP-9);
9. The Detroit Titans men's basketball team staging a preseason boycott to protest the coaching policies of Jim Harding (AP-10); and
10. The arrests of 11 men in connection with a Detroit-based sports national betting ring on New Year's Day (UPI-10).

== Office holders ==
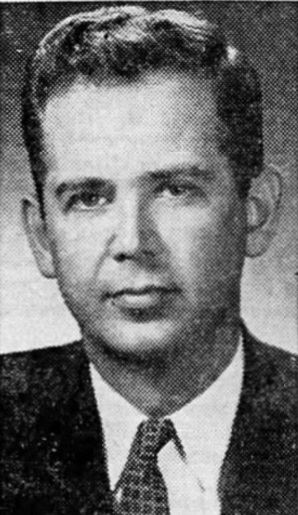
Gov. Milliken

=== State office holders ===
- Governor of Michigan: William Milliken (Republican)
- Lieutenant Governor of Michigan: Thomas F. Schweigert (Republican)
- Michigan Attorney General: Frank J. Kelley (Democrat)
- Michigan Secretary of State: James M. Hare (Democrat)
- Speaker of the Michigan House of Representatives: William A. Ryan (Democrat)
- Majority Leader of the Michigan Senate: Emil Lockwood (Republican)
- Chief Justice, Michigan Supreme Court: Thomas E. Brennan

=== Mayors of major cities ===
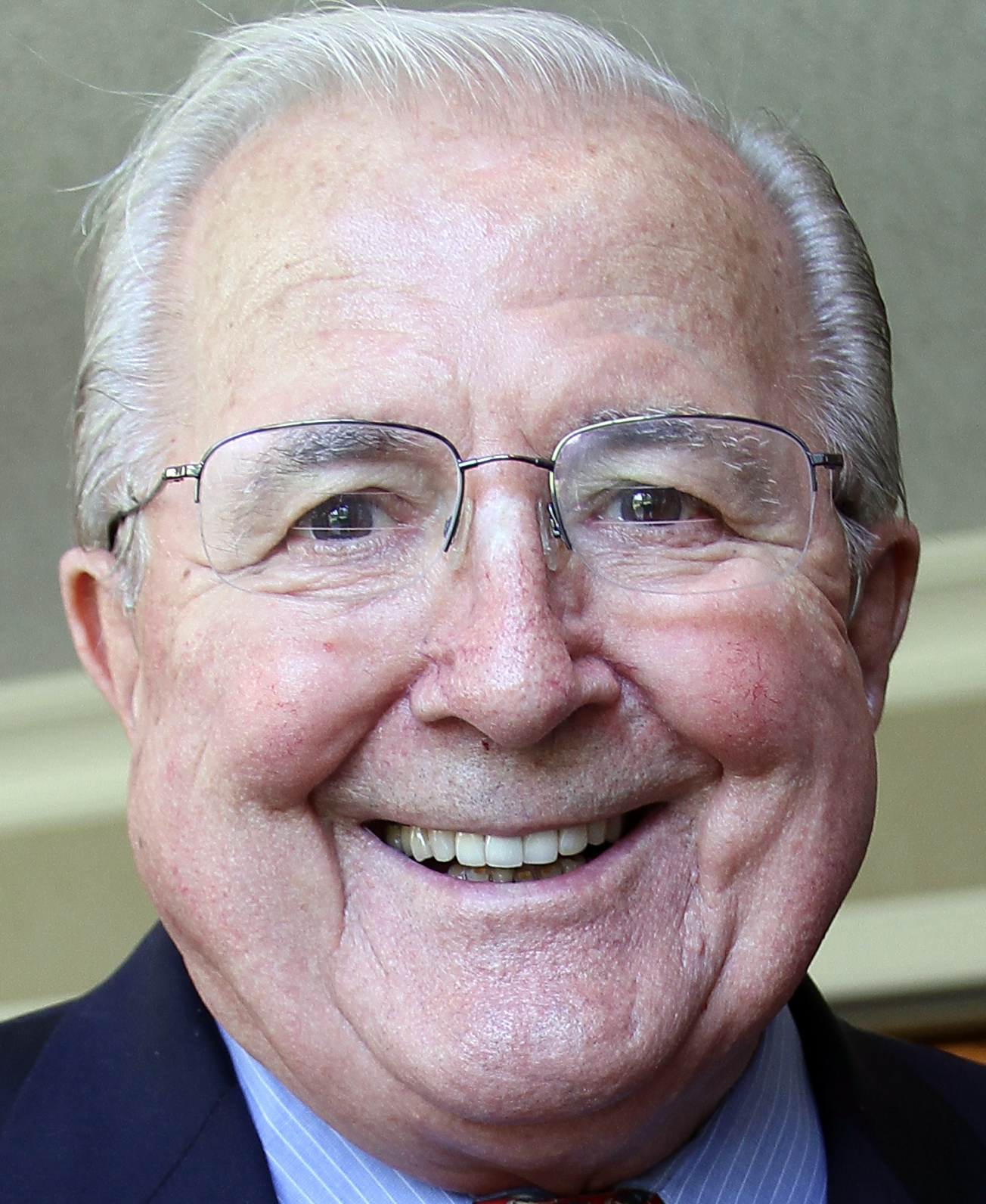
Mayor Gribbs

- Mayor of Detroit: Jerome Cavanagh/Roman Gribbs
- Mayor of Grand Rapids: C. H. Sonneveldt/Robert Boelens
- Mayor of Warren, Michigan: Ted Bates
- Mayor of Sterling Heights, Michigan: Gerald N. Donovan
- Mayor of Flint: Donald R. Cronin/Francis E. Limmer
- Mayor of Lansing: Gerald W. Graves
- Mayor of Dearborn: Orville L. Hubbard
- Mayor of Ann Arbor: Robert J. Harris (Democrat)
- Mayor of Saginaw: Warren C. Light

=== Federal office holders ===
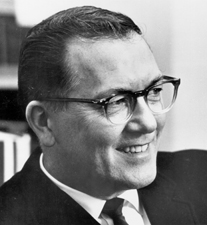
Sen. Griffin

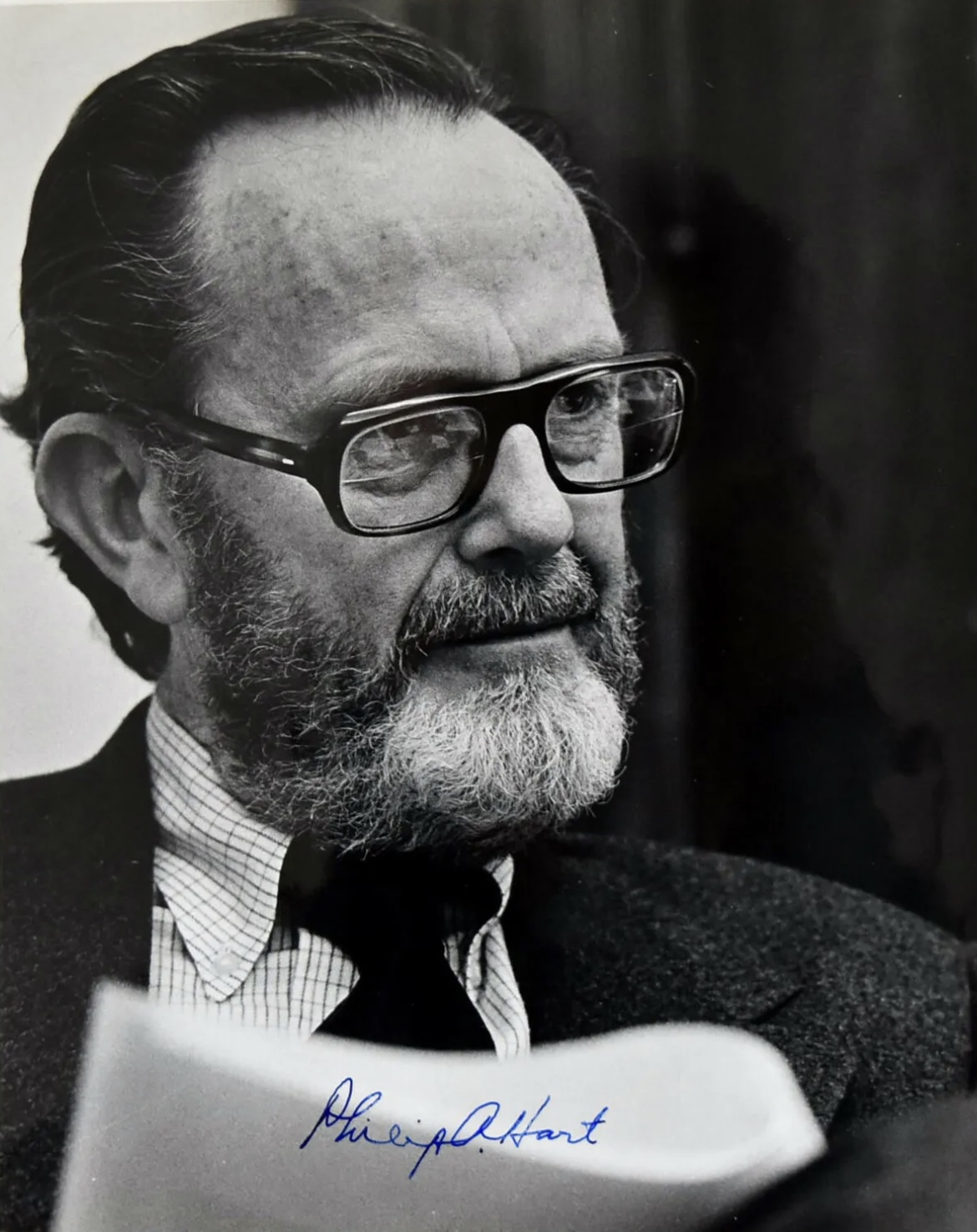
Sen. Hart

- U.S. Senator from Michigan: Robert P. Griffin (Republican)
- U.S. Senator from Michigan: Philip Hart (Democrat)
- House District 1: John Conyers (Democrat)
- House District 2: Marvin L. Esch (Republican)
- House District 3: Garry E. Brown (Republican)
- House District 4: J. Edward Hutchinson (Republican)
- House District 5: Gerald Ford (Republican)
- House District 6: Charles E. Chamberlain (Republican)
- House District 7: Donald W. Riegle Jr. (Republican)
- House District 8: R. James Harvey (Republican)
- House District 9: Guy Vander Jagt (Republican)
- House District 10: Elford Albin Cederberg (Republican)
- House District 11: Philip Ruppe (Republican)
- House District 12: James G. O'Hara (Democrat)
- House District 13: Charles Diggs (Democrat)
- House District 14: Lucien N. Nedzi (Democrat)
- House District 15: William D. Ford (Democrat)
- House District 16: John Dingell Jr. (Democrat)
- House District 17: Martha Griffiths (Democrat)
- House District 18: William Broomfield (Republican)
- House District 19: Jack H. McDonald (Republican)

== Population ==
In the 1970 United States census, Michigan was recorded as having a population of 8,875,083 persons, ranking as the seventh most populous state in the country. By 1980, the state's population had grown 4.4% to 9,262,078 persons.

=== Cities ===
The following is a list of cities in Michigan with a population of at least 70,000 based on 1970 U.S. Census data. Historic census data from 1960 and 1980 is included to reflect trends in population increases or decreases. Cities that are part of the Detroit metropolitan area are shaded in tan.

1970 Rank	City	County	1960 Pop.	1970 Pop.	1980 Pop.	Change 1970-80
1	Detroit	Wayne	1,670,144	1,514,063	1,203,368	−20.5% ▼
2	Grand Rapids	Kent	177,313	197,649	181,843	−8.0% ▼
3	Flint	Genesee	196,940	193,317	159,611	−17.4% ▼
4	Warren	Macomb	89,246	179,260	161,134	−10.1% ▼
5	Lansing	Ingham	107,807	131,403	130,414	−0.8% ▼
6	Livonia	Wayne	66,702	110,109	104,814	−4.8% ▼
7	Dearborn	Wayne	112,007	104,199	90,660	−13.0% ▼
8	Ann Arbor	Washtenaw	67,340	100,035	107,969	7.9% ▲
9	Saginaw	Saginaw	98,265	91,849	77,508	−15.6% ▼
10	St. Clair Shores	Macomb	76,657	88,093	76,210	−13.5% ▼
11	Westland	Wayne	60,743	86,749	84,603	−2.5% ▼
12	Royal Oak	Oakland	80,612	86,238	70,893	−17.8% ▼
13	Kalamazoo	Kalamazoo	82,089	85,555	79,722	−6.8% ▼
14	Pontiac	Oakland	82,233	85,279	76,715	−10.0% ▼
15	Dearborn Heights	Wayne	61,118	80,069	67,706	−15.4% ▼
16	Taylor	Wayne	na	70,020	77,568	10.8% ▲

=== Counties ===
The following is a list of counties in Michigan with populations of at least 120,000 based on 1970 U.S. Census data. Historic census data from 1960 and 1980 are included to reflect trends in population increases or decreases. Counties that are part of the Detroit metropolitan area are shaded in tan.

1970 Rank	County	Largest city	1960 Pop.	1970 Pop.	1980 Pop.	Change 1970-80
1	Wayne	Detroit	2,666,297	2,666,751	2,337,891	−12.3% ▼
2	Oakland	Pontiac	690,259	907,871	1,011,793	11.4% ▲
3	Macomb	Warren	405,804	625,309	694,600	11.1% ▲
4	Genesee	Flint	374,313	444,341	450,449	1.4% ▲
5	Kent	Grand Rapids	363,187	411,044	444,506	8.1% ▲
6	Ingham	Lansing	211,296	261,039	275,520	5.5% ▲
7	Washtenaw	Ann Arbor	172,440	234,103	264,748	13.1% ▲
8	Saginaw	Saginaw	190,752	219,743	228,059	3.8% ▲
9	Kalamazoo	Kalamazoo	169,712	201,550	212,378	5.4% ▲
10	Berrien	Benton Harbor	149,865	163,875	171,276	4.5% ▲
11	Muskegon	Muskegon	129,943	157,426	157,589	0.1% ▲
12	Jackson	Jackson	131,994	143,274	151,495	5.7% ▲
13	Calhoun	Battle Creek	138,858	141,963	141,557	−0.3% ▼
14	Ottawa	Holland	98,719	128,181	157,174	22.6% ▲
15	St. Clair	Port Huron	107,201	120,175	138,802	15.5% ▲
16	Monroe	Monroe	101,120	118,479	134,659	13.7% ▲
17	Bay	Bay City	107,042	117,339	119,881	2.2% ▲

== Sports ==
=== Baseball ===
- 1970 Detroit Tigers season – Under manager Mayo Smith, the Tigers compiled a 79–83 record and finished fourth in the American League East. The Tigers remained in contention through late August, but then compiled a 9–26 record from August 25 to September 29. The team's statistical leaders included Willie Horton with a .305 batting average, Jim Northrup with 24 home runs and 80 RBIs, Mickey Lolich with 14 wins, and John Hiller with a 3.03 earned run average. After the season ended, Mayo Smith was replaced by Billy Martin as the team's manager.
- 1970 Michigan Wolverines baseball team - Under head coach Moby Benedict, the Wolverines compiled a 16–18 record and finished fourth in the Big Ten Conference.

=== American football ===
- 1970 Detroit Lions season – The Lions, under head coach Joe Schmidt, compiled a 10–4 record and finished in second place in the NFL's Central Division. The team's statistical leaders included Greg Landry with 1,072 passing yards, Mel Farr with 717 rushing yards, Charlie Sanders with 544 receiving yards, and Errol Mann with 101 points scored.
- 1970 Michigan Wolverines football team – Under head coach Bo Schembechler, the Wolverines won their first nine games before losing to Ohio State. The team concluded its season with a 9–1 record and was ranked No. 9 in the final AP Poll. The team's statistical leaders included Don Moorhead with 1,167 passing yards, Billy Taylor with 911 rushing yards and 66 points scored, and Paul Staroba with 519 receiving yards.
- 1970 Michigan State Spartans football team – Under head coach Duffy Daugherty, the Spartans compiled a 4–6 record.

=== Basketball ===
- 1969–70 Detroit Pistons season – Under head coach Butch Van Breda Kolff, the Pistons compiled a 31–51 record. The team's statistical leaders included Jimmy Walker with 1,687 points, Dave Bing with 418 assists and Otto Moore with 900 rebounds.
- 1969–70 Michigan Wolverines men's basketball team – Under head coach Johnny Orr, the Wolverines compiled a 10–14 record. Rudy Tomjanovich led the team with 722 points and 376 rebounds.
- 1969–70 Michigan State Spartans men's basketball team – Under head coach Gus Ganakas, the Spartans compiled a 9–15 record.
- 1969–70 Detroit Titans men's basketball team – The Titans compiled a 7–18 record under head coach Jim Harding.

=== Ice hockey ===
- 1969–70 Detroit Red Wings season – Under head coaches Bill Gadsby and Sid Abel, the Red Wings compiled a 40–21–15 record, finished third in the National Hockey League's East Division, and lost in the opening round of the playoffs to the Chicago Black Hawks. The team's statistical leaders included Gary Unger with 42 goals, Alex Delvecchio with 47 assists, and Gordie Howe with 71 points. The team's regular goaltenders were Roy Edwards and Roger Crozier.
- 1969–70 Michigan Tech Huskies men's ice hockey team – Under head coach John MacInnes, Michigan Tech compiled a 19–12–3 record and finished fourth at the 1970 NCAA Division I Men's Ice Hockey Tournament.
- 1969–70 Michigan Wolverines men's ice hockey season – Under head coach Al Renfrew, the Wolverines compiled a 14–16 record.
- 1969–70 Michigan State Spartans men's ice hockey team – Under head coach Amo Bessone, the Spartans compiled a 13–16 record.

=== Golf ===
- Buick Open –
- Michigan Open –

=== Boat racing ===
- Port Huron to Mackinac Boat Race –
- Spirit of Detroit race –
- APBA Gold Cup –

=== Other ===
- 1970 NCAA Indoor Track and Field Championships – The fifth annual NCAA indoor championships were held at Cobo Arena in Detroit in March; Kansas won the team championship.
- Yankee 600 -

== Music ==
Several songs performed by Michigan acts and/or recorded in Michigan ranked on the Billboard Year-End Hot 100 singles of 1970, including the following:

- "War" by Edwin Starr (No. 5), recorded at Hitsville U.S.A.
- "Ain't No Mountain High Enough" by Diana Ross (No. 6), recorded at Hitsville U.S.A.
- "Get Ready" by Rare Earth (No. 8), recorded at Hitsville U.S.A.
- "Ball of Confusion (That's What the World Is Today)" by The Temptations (No. 24), recorded at Hitsville U.S.A.
- "Signed, Sealed, Delivered I'm Yours" by Stevie Wonder (No. 31)
- "(I Know) I'm Losing You" by Rare Earth (No. 55), recorded at Hitsville U.S.A.
- "Still Water (Love)" by the Four Tops (No. 58)
- "It's a Shame by The Spinners (No. 76)
- "Up the Ladder to the Roof" by The Supremes (No. 88), recorded at Hitsville U.S.A.
- "Psychedelic Shack" by The Temptations (No. 91), recorded at Hitsville U.S.A.
- "Call Me" by Aretha Franklin (No. 100)

Other hit songs included:

- "Heaven Help Us All" by Stevie Wonder reached No. 9 on the Billboard Hot 100
- "Stoned Love" by The Supremes reached No. 7 on the Billboard Hot 100 and No. 1 on the R&B chart

Albums released by Michigan acts and/or recorded in Michigan in 1970 included the following:

- That's the Way Love Is by Marvin Gaye was recorded at Hitsville U.S.A. and released on January 8;
- Back in the USA by the MC5 was recorded at GM Studios in East Detroit and released on January 15;
- This Girl's in Love with You by Aretha Franklin was released on January 15;
- Psychedelic Shack by The Temptations was recorded at Hitsville U.S.A. and released on March 6;
- Easy Action by Alice Cooper was released on March 27;
- Marriage on the Rocks/Rock Bottom by The Amboy Dukes (featuring Ted Nugent) was released in March;
- Farewell by Diana Ross & The Supremes was released on April 13;
- Right On by The Supremes (first album without Diana Ross) was released on April 26;
- What Love Has...Joined Together by Smokey Robinson & The Miracles was recorded at Hitsville U.S.A. and released on April 28;
- Closer to Home by Grand Funk Railroad was released on June 15;
- Diana Ross by Diana Ross was released on June 19;
- Ecology by Rare Earth was released in June;
- Fun House by The Stooges was released on July 7;
- Signed, Sealed & Delivered by Stevie Wonder was recorded at Hitsville U.S.A. and released on August 7;
- Spirit in the Dark by Aretha Franklin was released on August 24;
- Mongrel by The Bob Seger System was released in August;
- A Pocket Full of Miracles by The Miracles was released on September 30;
- The Magnificent 7 by The Supremes and The Miracles was released in September;
- New Ways but Love Stays by The Supremes was released in October; and
- Live Album by Grand Funk Railroad was released on November 16.

== Births ==
- January 24 - Matthew Lillard, actor (Scream, Scooby-Doo), in Lansing, Michigan
- March 5 - Rome, R&B singer who had a No. 6 hit in 1997 with "I Belong to You (Every Time I See Your Face)", in Benton Harbor, Michigan
- March 14 - Brent Gates, Major League Baseball infielder (1993-1999), in Grand Rapids, Michigan
- April 6 - Glenn Kessler, screenwriter, actor and producer (Damages), in Michigan
- April 14 - Steve Avery, Major League Baseball pitcher (1990-2003), NLCS MVP (1991), All-Star (1993), World Series champion (1995), in Trenton, Michigan
- May 23 - Bryan Herta, race car driver whose Bryan Herta Autosport team won the 2011 Indianapolis 500, in Warren, Michigan
- June 1 - Alexi Lalas, soccer defender and member of Team USA at 1994 FIFA World Cup, in Birmingham, Michigan
- June 7 - Mike Modano, NHL player (1988-2011), the all-time scoring leader in NHL among American players, and inductee of Hockey Hall of Fame, in Livonia, Michigan
- June 8 - Kwame Kilpatrick, Mayor of Detroit (2002-2008), in Detroit
- June 16 - Cobi Jones, soccer midfielder for the Los Angeles Galaxy (1996-2007) and all-time leader in appearances for Team USA, in Detroit
- July 11 - Billy Ashley, Major League Baseball outfielder (1992-1998), in Trenton, Michigan
- July 19 - John Heffron, stand-up comic, in Detroit
- September 10 - Carl Quintanilla, journalist and anchor for CNBC and NBC, in Midland, Michigan
- October 4 - Craig DeRoche, 69th Speaker of the Michigan House of Representatives (2005-2006)
- October 15 - Mike Peplowski (1993-1996), NBA player, in Detroit

=== Gallery of 1970 births ===
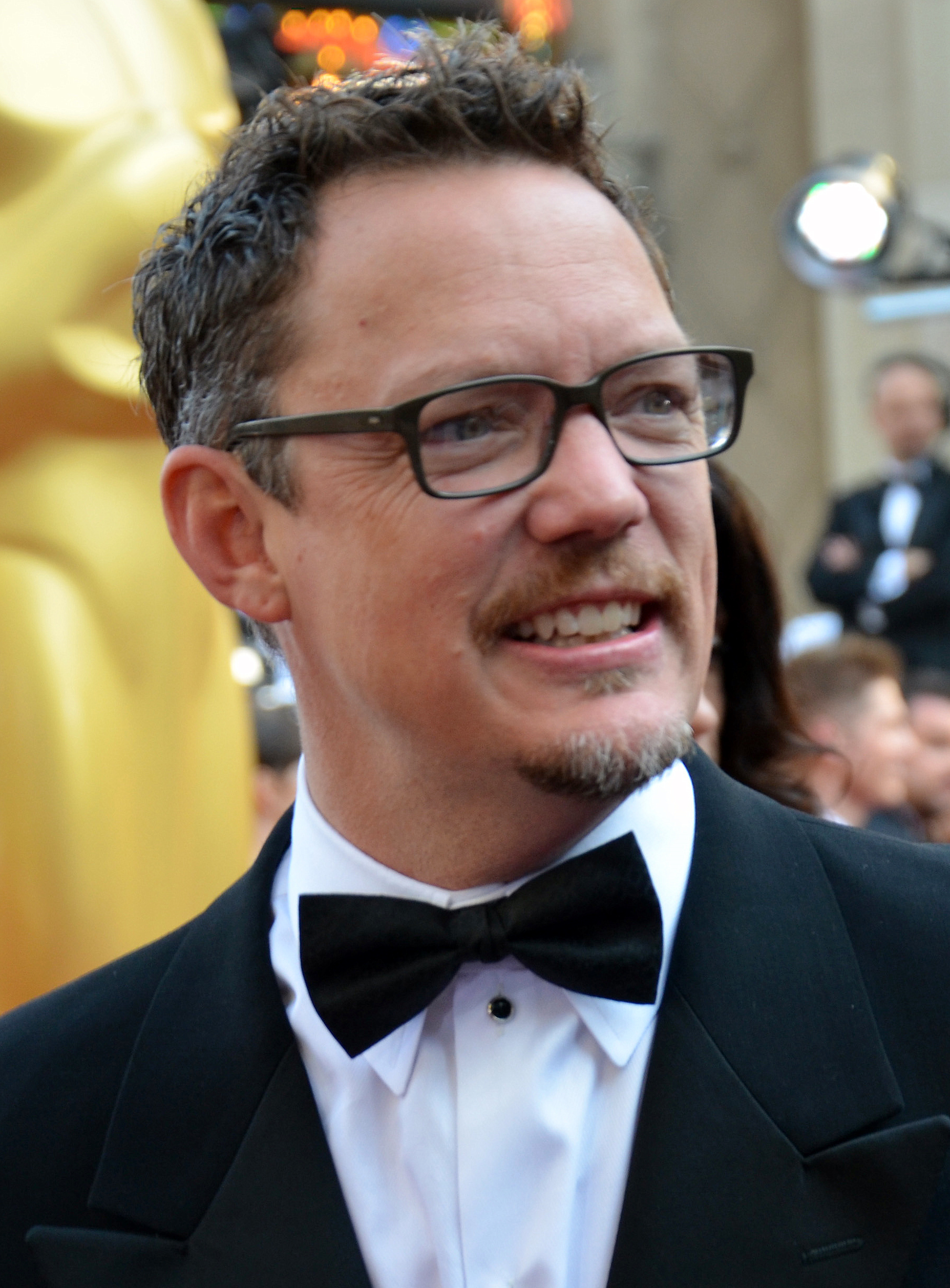
Matthew Lillard

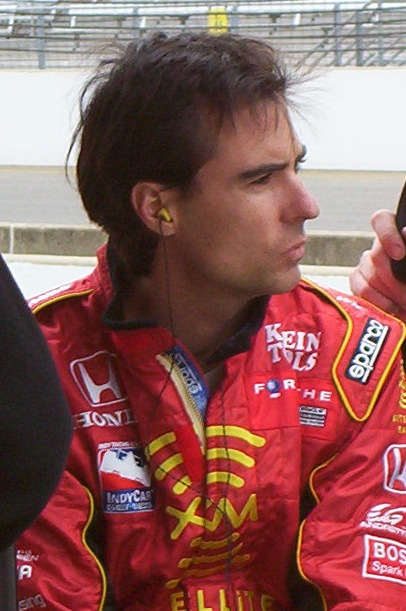
Bryan Herta

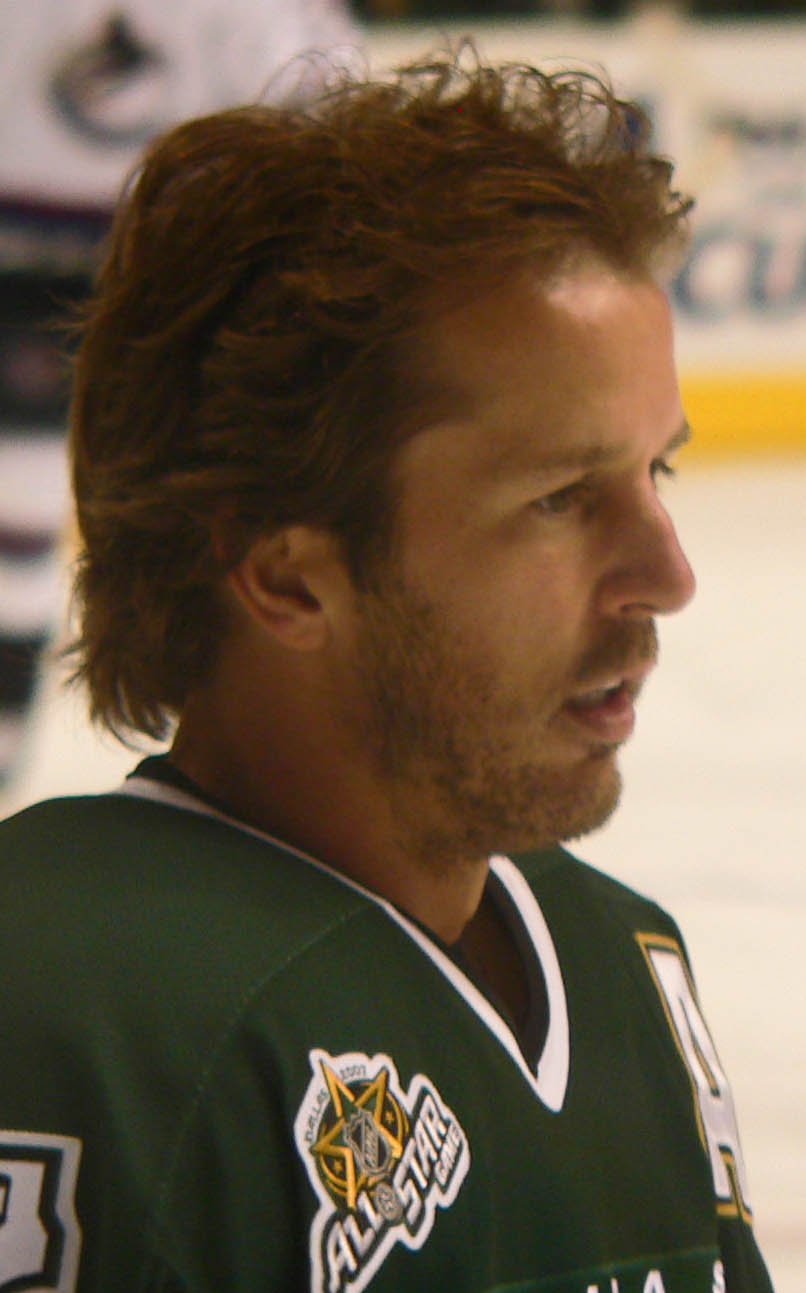
Mike Modano

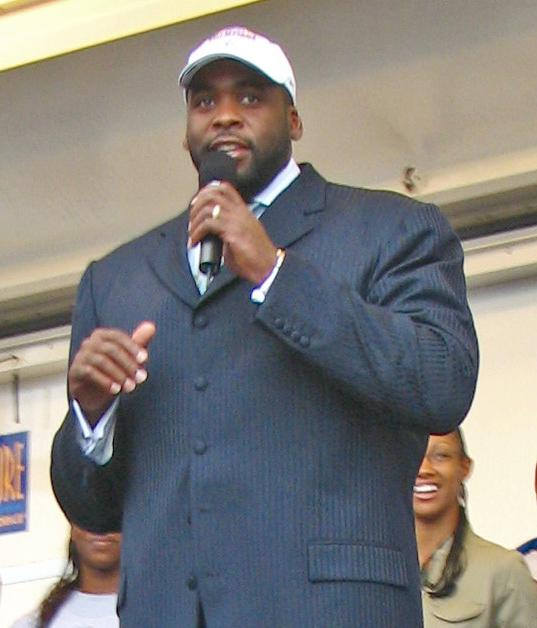
Kwame Kilpatrick

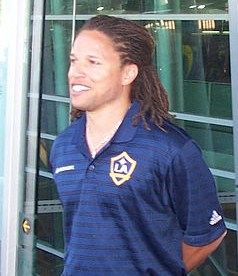
Cobi Jones

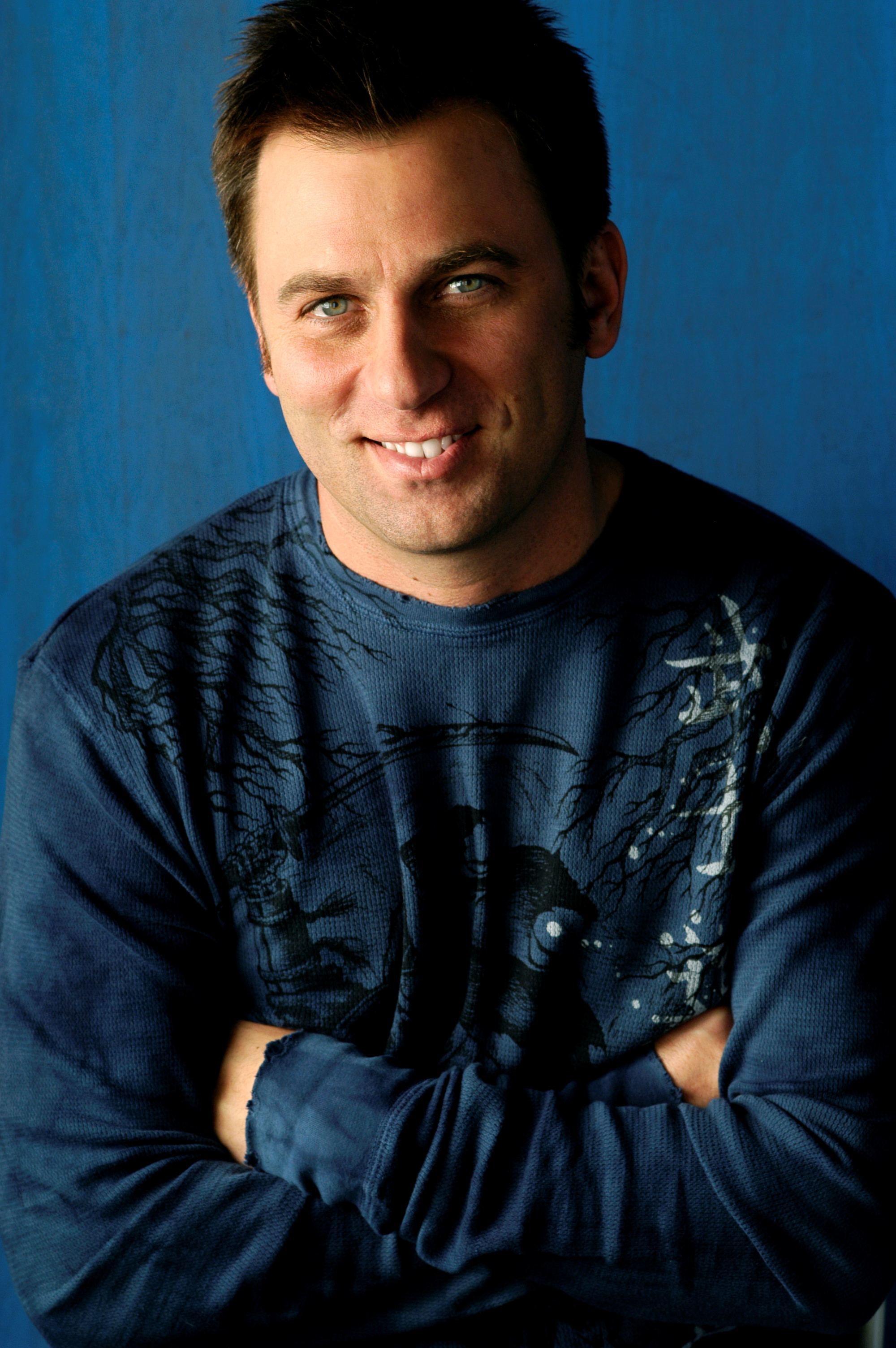
John Heffron

== Deaths ==
- February 5 - Rudy York, Major League Baseball player (1934-1948), 7× All-Star, World Series champion (1945), AL home run and RBI leader (1943), in Rome, Georgia
- February 17 - Thaddeus M. Machrowicz, U.S. Congressman (1951-1961), at age 70 in Bloomfield Township, Michigan
- May 9 - Walter Reuther, labor union leader who built the United Auto Workers into a major force, at age 62 in a plane crash at Pellston, Michigan
- May 31 - Terry Sawchuk, NHL goalie (1949-1970), at age 40 in New York City
- June 2 - Anna Thompson Dodge, one of the richest women in the world at time of her death, at age 100 in Grosse Pointe Farms, Michigan
- November 20 - Les Bingaman, Detroit Lions player (1948-1954), at age 44

=== Gallery of 1970 deaths ===
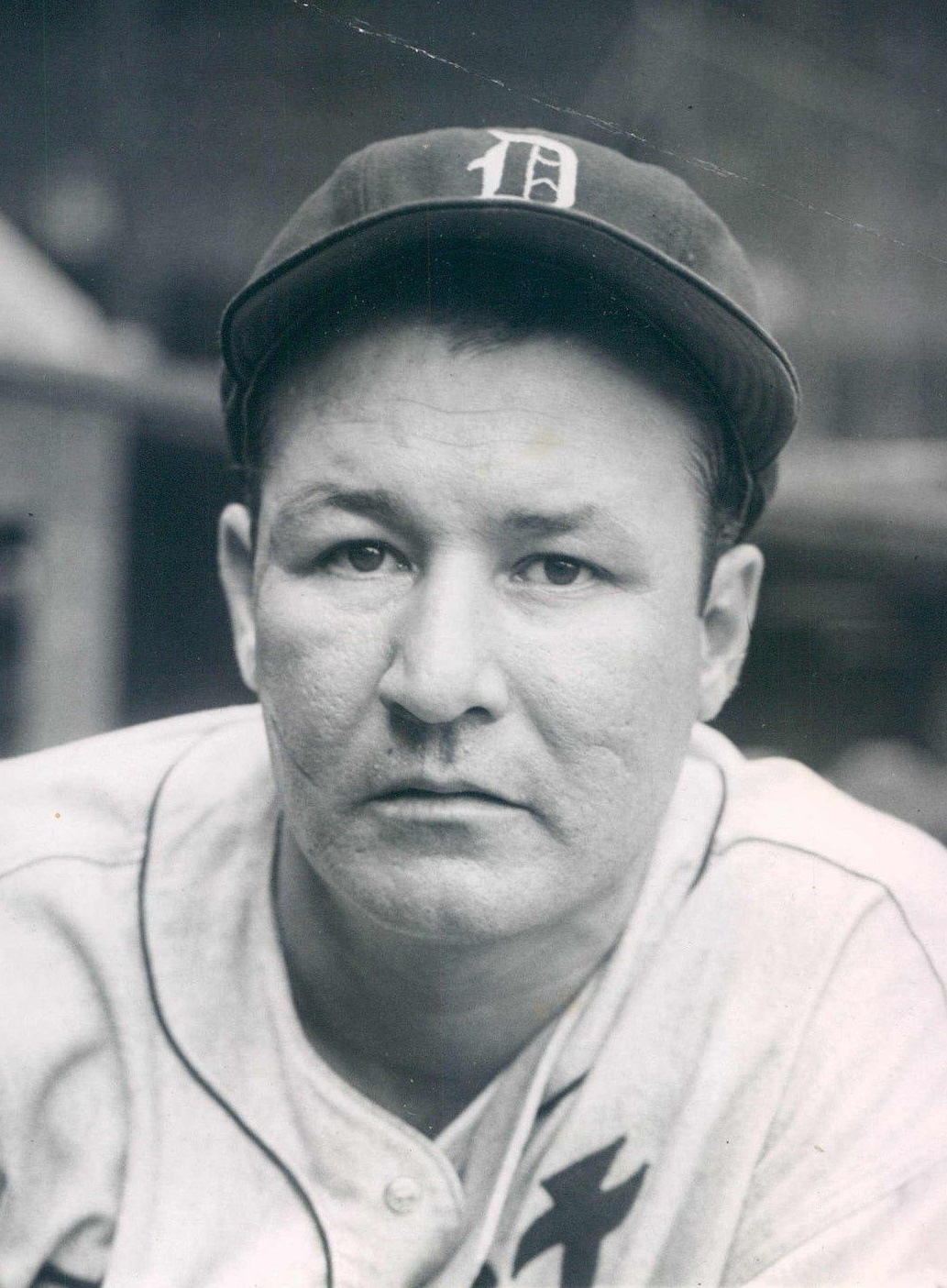
Rudy York

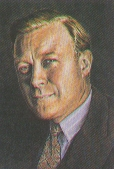
Walter Reuther

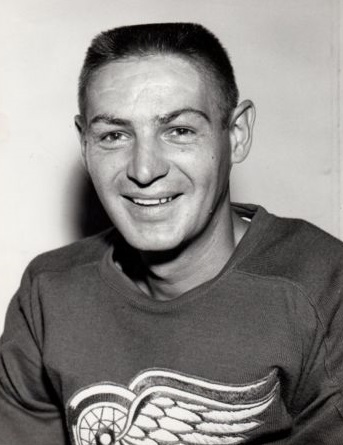
Terry Sawchuck

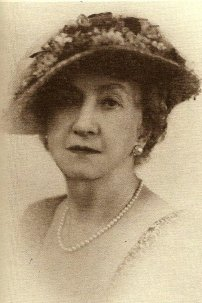
Anna Thompson Dodge

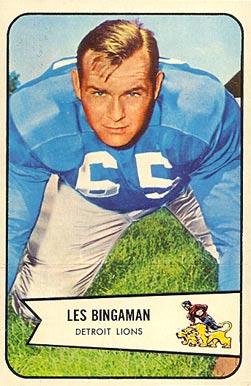
Les Bingaman

== See also ==
- History of Michigan
- History of Detroit
