= 1968 in Michigan =

- Decades: 1940s; 1950s; 1960s; 1970s; 1980s
- See also: History of Michigan; Historical outline of Michigan; List of years in Michigan; 1968 in the United States

Events from the year 1968 in Michigan.

The Associated Press (AP) surveyed newspaper editors and broadcasters and determined the top 10 stories in Michigan for 1968 as follows:

1. The candidacy of Gov. George W. Romney for President of the United States;
2. The 1968 Detroit Tigers winning the American League pennant and defeating the St. Louis Cardinals in the 1968 World Series;
3. A newspaper strike that shut down the state's two largest newspapers, the Detroit Free Press and The Detroit News, for nine months;
4. Gov. Romney's decision to resign as Governor to become United States Secretary of Housing and Urban Development under Pres. Richard M. Nixon;
5. The reapportionment and redistricting of the state's county boards to reflect a "one man, one vote" proportionality;
6. Michigan voters' defeat of a ballot measure to adopt daylight saving time;
7. Hubert H. Humphrey's taking Michigan's 21 electoral votes in the 1968 United States presidential election (Humphrey received 1,593,082 votes (48.18%) to 1,370,665 (41.46%) for Richard M. Nixon and 331,968 (10.04%) for George Wallace);
8. The Robison family murders, a mass murder on June 25 of six family members while vacationing in their Lake Michigan cottage just north of Good Hart, Michigan;
9. Two heart transplants performed at the University of Michigan Hospital; and
10. The adoption a statewide laws for open housing and the protection of tenants' rights.

The AP also selected the state's top 10 sports stories as follows:

1. Mickey Lolich's three victories in the 1968 World Series;
2. The Detroit Tigers winning the American League pennant for the first time since 1968;
3. Denny McLain's 31 wins as a pitcher for the Tigers;
4. Gordie Howe's 700th goal and 1,500th game for the Detroit Red Wings;
5. Ron Johnson's season, setting an NCAA record with 347 rushing yards in a game and Michigan records with 1,391 rushing yards and 114 points scored during the 1968 season;
6. The Detroit Lions' acquisition of quarterback Bill Munson and their poor performance during the 1968 season;
7. Spencer Haywood's transfer to Detroit Mercy and his leading a resurgence in the school's basketball fortunes during the 1968-69 season;
8. The popularity of coho salmon fishing;
9. Two members of the Detroit Lions, Mel Farr and Lem Barney winning the NFL's offensive and defensive rookie of the year honors; and
10. The death of Warner Gardner in a crash during the APBA Gold Cup unlimited hydroplane race on September 8 on the Detroit River.

== Office holders ==
=== State office holders ===
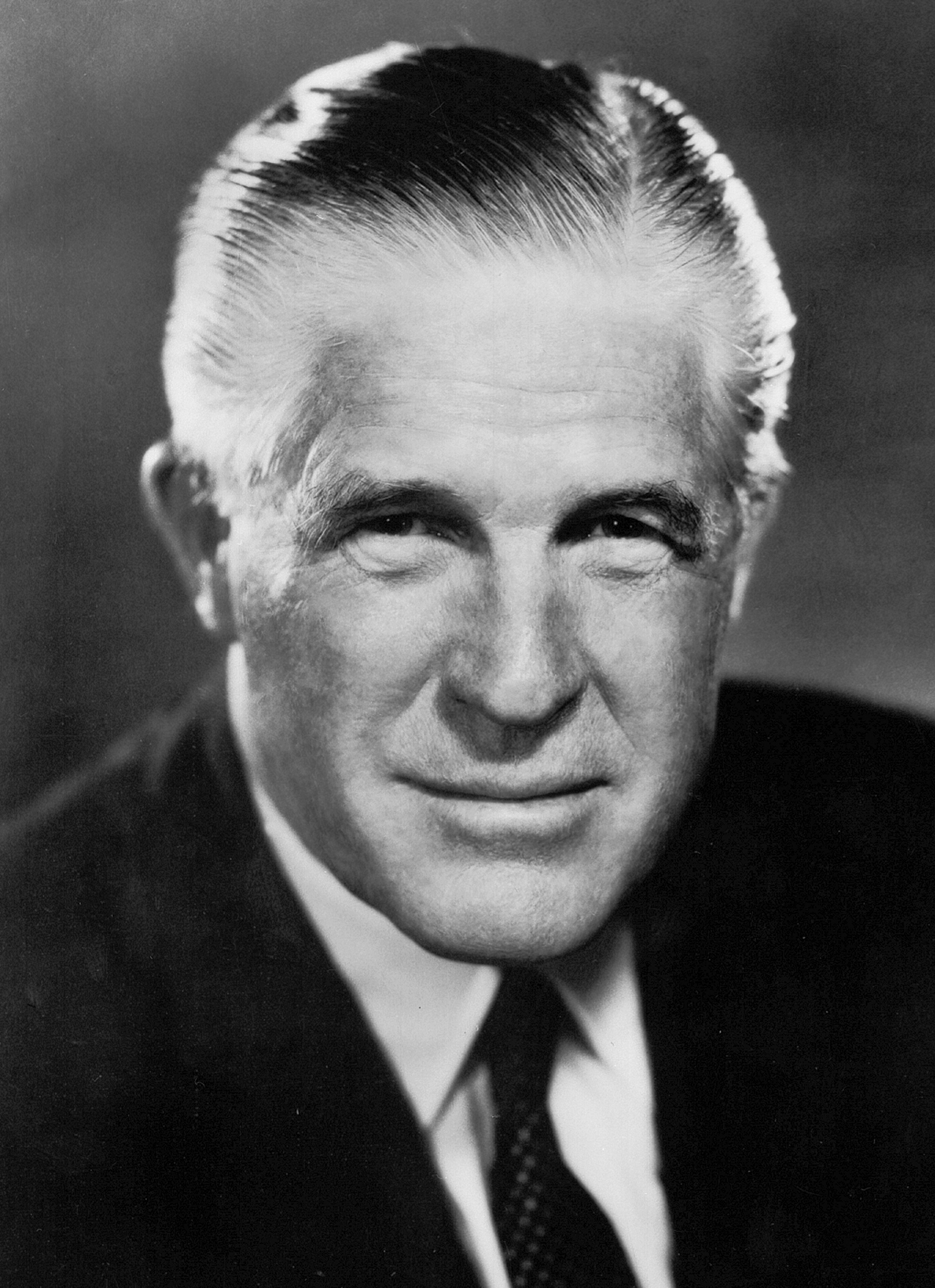
Gov. Romney

- Governor of Michigan: George W. Romney (Republican)
- Lieutenant Governor of Michigan: William Milliken (Republican)
- Michigan Attorney General: Frank J. Kelley (Democrat)
- Michigan Secretary of State: James M. Hare (Democrat)
- Speaker of the Michigan House of Representatives: Robert E. Waldron (Republican)
- Majority Leader of the Michigan Senate: Emil Lockwood (Republican)
- Chief Justice, Michigan Supreme Court: John R. Dethmers/Thomas E. Brennan

=== Mayors of major cities ===
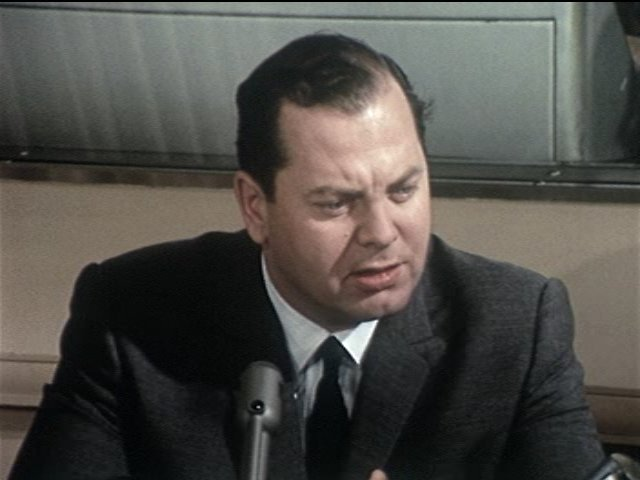
Mayor Cavanagh

- Mayor of Detroit: Jerome Cavanagh
- Mayor of Grand Rapids: C. H. Sonneveldt
- Mayor of Warren, Michigan: Ted Bates
- Mayor of Sterling Heights, Michigan: Gerald N. Donovan
- Mayor of Flint: Floyd J. McCree/Donald R. Cronin
- Mayor of Saginaw: Henry G. Marsh
- Mayor of Dearborn: Orville L. Hubbard
- Mayor of Lansing: Max E. Murninghan
- Mayor of Ann Arbor: Wendell Hulcher (Republican)

=== Federal office holders ===
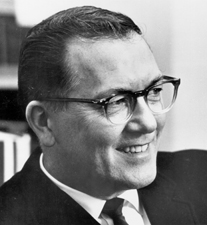
Sen. Griffin

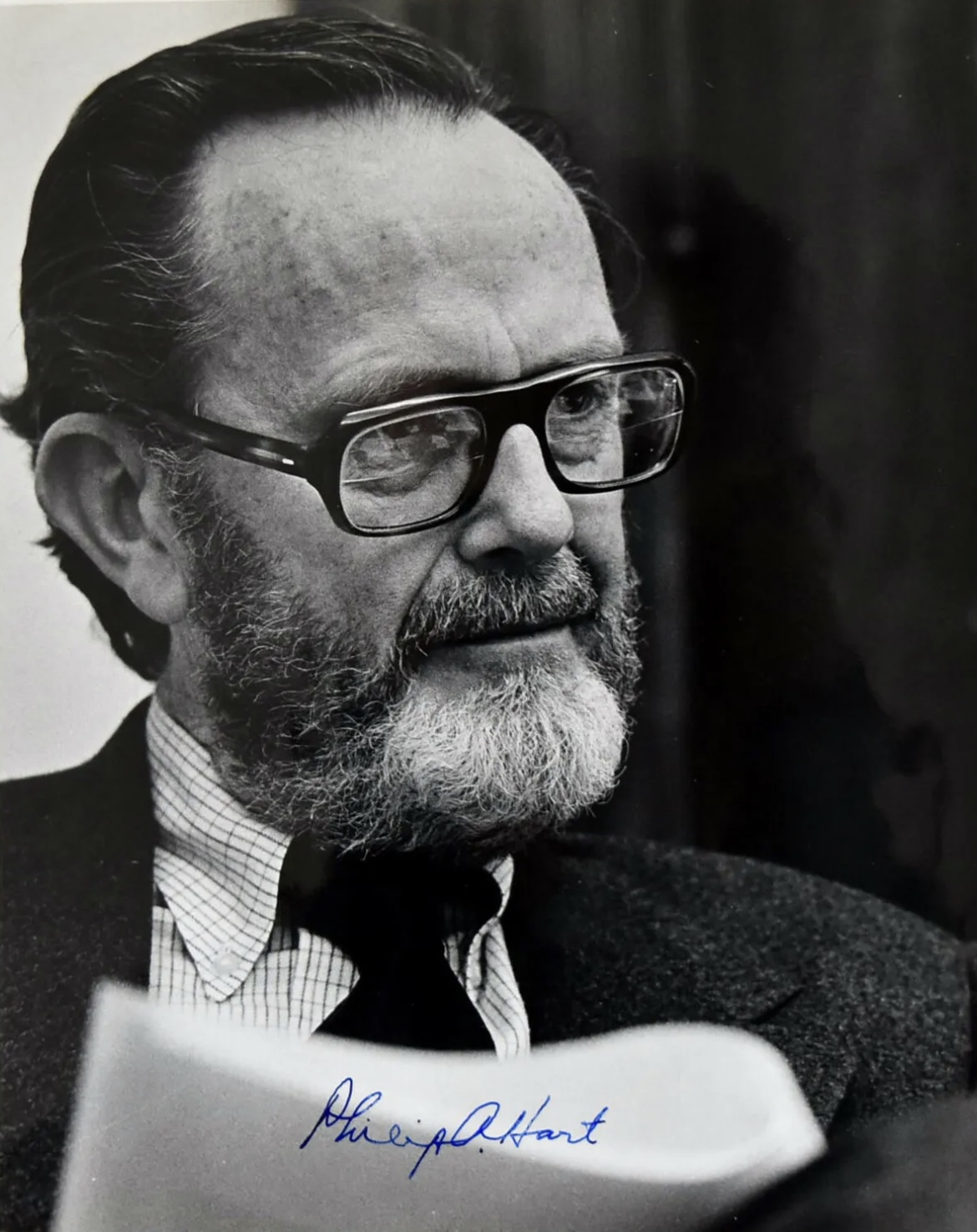
Sen. Hart

- U.S. Senator from Michigan: Robert P. Griffin (Republican)
- U.S. Senator from Michigan: Philip Hart (Democrat)
- House District 1: John Conyers (Democrat)
- House District 2: Marvin L. Esch (Republican)
- House District 3: Garry E. Brown (Republican)
- House District 4: J. Edward Hutchinson (Republican)
- House District 5: Gerald Ford (Republican)
- House District 6: Charles E. Chamberlain (Republican)
- House District 7: Donald W. Riegle Jr. (Republican)
- House District 8: R. James Harvey (Republican)
- House District 9: Guy Vander Jagt (Republican)
- House District 10: Elford Albin Cederberg (Republican)
- House District 11: Philip Ruppe (Republican)
- House District 12: James G. O'Hara (Democrat)
- House District 13: Charles Diggs (Democrat)
- House District 14: Lucien N. Nedzi (Democrat)
- House District 15: William D. Ford (Democrat)
- House District 16: John Dingell Jr. (Democrat)
- House District 17: Martha Griffiths (Democrat)
- House District 18: William Broomfield (Republican)
- House District 19: Jack H. McDonald (Republican)

== Population ==
In the 1960 United States census, Michigan was recorded as having a population of 7,823,194 persons, ranking as the seventh most populous state in the country. By 1970, the state's population had grown 13.4% to 8,875,083 persons.

=== Cities ===
The following is a list of cities in Michigan with a population of at least 60,000 based on 1960 U.S. Census data. Historic census data from 1950 and 1970 is included to reflect trends in population increases or decreases. Cities that are part of the Detroit metropolitan area are shaded in tan.

1960 Rank	City	County	1950 Pop.	1960 Pop.	1970 Pop.	Change 1960-70
1	Detroit	Wayne	1,849,568	1,670,144	1,514,063	−9.3% ▼
2	Flint	Genesee	163,143	196,940	193,317	−1.8% ▼
3	Grand Rapids	Kent	176,515	177,313	197,649	11.5% ▲
4	Dearborn	Wayne	94,994	112,007	104,199	−7.0% ▼
5	Lansing	Ingham	92,129	107,807	131,403	21.9% ▲
6	Saginaw	Saginaw	92,918	98,265	91,849	−6.5% ▼
7	Warren	Macomb	42,653	89,246	179,260	100.2% ▲
8	Pontiac	Oakland	73,681	82,233	85,279	3.7% ▲
9	Kalamazoo	Kalamazoo	57,704	82,089	85,555	4.1% ▲
10	Royal Oak	Oakland	46,898	80,612	86,238	7.0% ▲
11	St. Clair Shores	Macomb	19,823	76,657	88,093	14.9% ▲
12	Ann Arbor	Washtenaw	48,251	67,340	100,035	48.6% ▲
13	Livonia	Wayne	17,634	66,702	110,109	65.1% ▲
14	Dearborn Heights	Wayne	20,235	61,118	80,069	31.0% ▲
15	Westland	Wayne	30,407	60,743	86,749	42.8% ▲

=== Counties ===
The following is a list of counties in Michigan with populations of at least 100,000 based on 1960 U.S. Census data. Historic census data from 1950 and 1970 are included to reflect trends in population increases or decreases. Counties that are part of the Detroit metropolitan area are shaded in tan.

1960 Rank	County	Largest city	1950 Pop.	1960 Pop.	1970 Pop.	Change 1960-70
1	Wayne	Detroit	2,435,235	2,666,297	2,666,751	0.0% ▲
2	Oakland	Pontiac	396,001	690,259	907,871	31.5% ▲
3	Macomb	Warren	184,961	405,804	625,309	54.1% ▲
4	Genesee	Flint	270,963	374,313	444,341	18.7% ▲
5	Kent	Grand Rapids	288,292	363,187	411,044	13.2% ▲
6	Ingham	Lansing	172,941	211,296	261,039	23.5% ▲
7	Saginaw	Saginaw	153,515	190,752	219,743	15.2% ▲
8	Washtenaw	Ann Arbor	134,606	172,440	234,103	35.8% ▲
9	Kalamazoo	Kalamazoo	126,707	169,712	201,550	18.8% ▲
10	Berrien	Benton Harbor	115,702	149,865	163,875	9.3% ▲
11	Calhoun	Battle Creek	120,813	138,858	141,963	2.2% ▲
12	Jackson	Jackson	108,168	131,994	143,274	8.5% ▲
13	Muskegon	Muskegon	121,545	129,943	157,426	21.2% ▲
14	St. Clair	Port Huron	91,599	107,201	120,175	12.1% ▲
15	Bay	Bay City	88,461	107,042	117,339	9.6% ▲
16	Monroe	Monroe	75,666	101,120	118,479	17.2% ▲

== Sports ==
=== Baseball ===
- 1968 Detroit Tigers season – Under manager Mayo Smith, the Tigers compiled a 103–59 record, won the American League pennant, and defeated the St. Louis Cardinals in seven games in the 1968 World Series. The team's statistical leaders included Al Kaline with a .287 batting average, Willie Horton with 36 home runs, Jim Northrup with 90 RBIs, and Denny McLain with 31 wins and a 1.96 earned run average.
- 1968 Michigan Wolverines baseball team - Under head coach Moby Benedict, the Wolverines compiled a 17–16 record and finished fourth in the Big Ten Conference.

=== American football ===
- 1968 Detroit Lions season – The Lions, under head coach Joe Schmidt, compiled a 4–8–2 record and finished in fourth place in the NFL's Central Division. The team's statistical leaders included Bill Munson with 2,311 passing yards, Mel Farr with 597 rushing yards, Earl McCullouch with 680 receiving yards, and Mel Farr and Billy Gambrell, each with 50 points scored.
- 1968 Michigan Wolverines football team – Under head coach Bump Elliott, the Wolverines compiled an 8–2 record and were ranked No. 12 in the final AP Poll. The team's statistical leaders included Dennis Brown with 1,562 passing yards, Ron Johnson with 1,391 rushing yards and 114 points scored, and Jim Mandich with 565 receiving yards.
- 1968 Michigan State Spartans football team – Under head coach Duffy Daugherty, the Spartans compiled a 5–5 record. The team's statistical leaders included Bill Triplett with 714 passing yards, Tom Love with 729 rushing yards, and Frank Foreman with 456 receiving yards.
- 1968 Eastern Michigan Hurons football team – Under head coach Dan Boisture, the Hurons compiled an 8–2 record.
- 1968 Central Michigan Chippewas football team – Under head coach Roy Kramer, the Chippewas compiled a 7–2 record and were Interstate Intercollegiate Athletic Conference co-champions.
- 1968 Western Michigan Broncos football team – Under head coach Bill Doolittle, the Broncos compiled a 3–6 record.

=== Basketball ===
- 1967–68 Detroit Pistons season – Under head coach Donnie Butcher, the Pistons compiled a 40–42 record. The team's statistical leaders included Dave Bing with 2,142 points and 509 assists and Dave DeBusschere with 1,082 rebounds.
- 1967–68 Michigan Wolverines men's basketball team – Under head coach Dave Strack, the Wolverines compiled an 11–13 record. Rudy Tomjanovich led the team with 469 points and 323 rebounds.
- 1967–68 Detroit Titans men's basketball team – The Titans compiled a 13–12 record under head coach Bob Calihan.
- 1967–68 Michigan State Spartans men's basketball team – Under head coach John E. Benington, the Spartans compiled a 12–12 record.
- 1967–68 Western Michigan Broncos men's basketball team – Under head coach Clarence Sonny Means, the Broncos compiled an 11–13 record.

=== Ice hockey ===
- 1967–68 Detroit Red Wings season – Under head coach Sid Abel, the Red Wings compiled a 27–35–12 record and finished sixth in the National Hockey League's East Division. The team's statistical leaders included Gordie Howe with 39 goals and 82 points and Alex Delvecchio with 48 assists. The team's regular goaltenders were Roy Edwards and Roger Crozier.
- 1967–68 Michigan Tech Huskies men's ice hockey team – Under head coach John MacInnes, Michigan Tech compiled a 22–9–1 record.
- 1967–68 Michigan Wolverines men's ice hockey season – Under head coach Al Renfrew, the Wolverines compiled an 18–9 record.
- 1967–68 Michigan State Spartans men's ice hockey team – Under head coach Amo Bessone, the Spartans compiled an 11–16–2 record.

=== Golf ===
- Buick Open –
- Michigan Open –

=== Boat racing ===
- Port Huron to Mackinac Boat Race –
- Spirit of Detroit race –
- APBA Gold Cup –

=== Other ===
- 1968 NCAA Indoor Track and Field Championships – The fourth annual NCAA indoor championships were held at Cobo Arena in Detroit in March; Villanova won the team championship.

== Chronology of events ==
=== February ===
- February 29 - George W. Romney ended his campaign for the Republican Presidential nomination.

=== May ===
- May 1 - The Detroit Lions acquired quarterback Bill Munson in a trade with the Los Angeles Rams.

=== June ===
- June 25 - The Robison family murders

=== September ===
- September 14 - Denny McLain won his 30th game of the year, a 5-4 win over the Oakland Athletics at Tiger Stadium. Dizzy Dean, the last pitcher to win 30 games was present to cheer for McLain. The Tigers scored two runs in the ninth inning to secure the victory.

=== October ===
- October 10 - The Detroit Tigers won Game 7 of the 1968 World Series, 4-1, against the St. Louis Cardinals. Mickey Lolich pitched a complete game on two days' rest.

=== November ===
- November 5

- Hubert H. Humphrey took Michigan's 21 electoral votes in the 1968 United States presidential election. Humphrey received 1,593,082 votes (48.18%) to 1,370,665 (41.46%) for Richard M. Nixon and 331,968 (10.04%) for George Wallace.

- November 16 - Ron Johnson of Michigan set an NCAA single-game record with 347 rushing yards against Wisconsin.

== Births ==
- January 17 - Butch Jones, American football coach at Tennessee (2013-2017), in Saugatuck, Michigan
- July 30 - Terry Crews, actor (Everybody Hates Chris, Brooklyn Nine-Nine), in Flint, Michigan
- September 20 - Sheldon Neeley, State Representative (2015-2019), Mayor of Flint (2019- )

=== Gallery of 1968 births ===
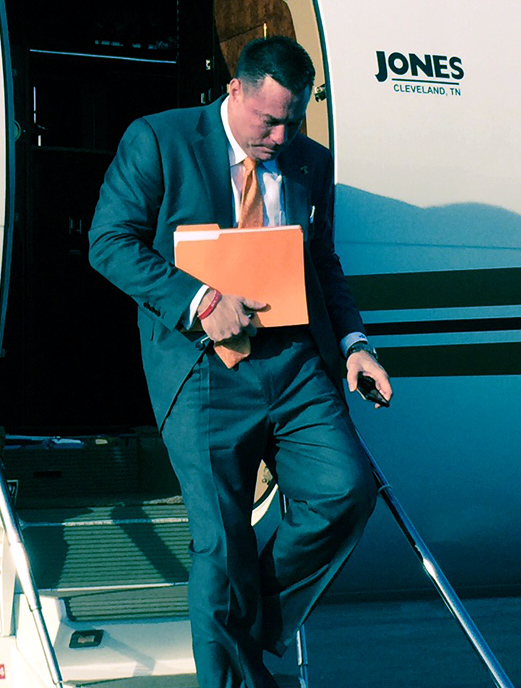
Butch Jones

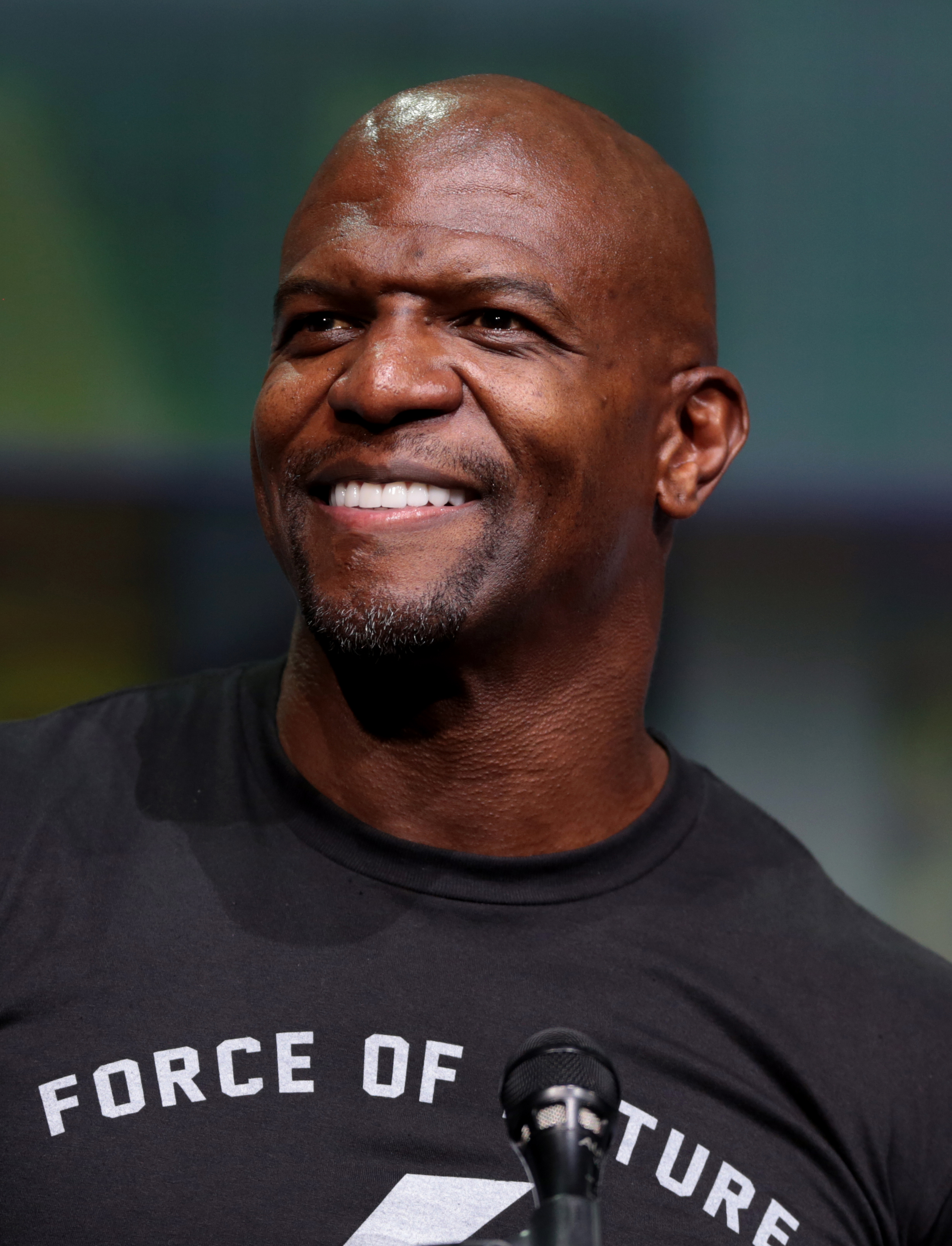
Terry Crews

== Deaths ==
- January 26 - John Kobs, head baseball coach at Michigan State University from 1925 to 1963, at age 69 in East Lansing, Michigan
- January 29 - George Anthony Dondero, U.S. Congressman from Michigan (1933-1957) and author of the bill creating the Saint Lawrence Seaway, at age 84 in Royal Oak, Michigan
- April 16 - Edna Ferber, Pulitzer Prize winning author (So Big, Show Boat, Cimarron, Giant) and Kalamazoo native, at age 82 in New York City
- May 1 - Jack Adams, coach (1927-1947) and manager (1927-1962) of the Detroit Red Wings who discovered and signed 16-year-old Gordie Howe, at age 73 from a heart attack at his office in Detroit
- October 28 - Wilber M. Brucker, Governor of Michigan (1931-1933) and United States Secretary of the Army (1955-1961), at age 74 in Detroit
- December 12 - Ty Tyson, first radio broadcaster of a University of Michigan football game (1924), first to broadcast a regularly scheduled baseball game (1927), and the radio and later television voice of the Tigers from 1927 to 1951, at age 89 in Grosse Pointe Farms, Michigan

=== Gallery of 1968 deaths ===
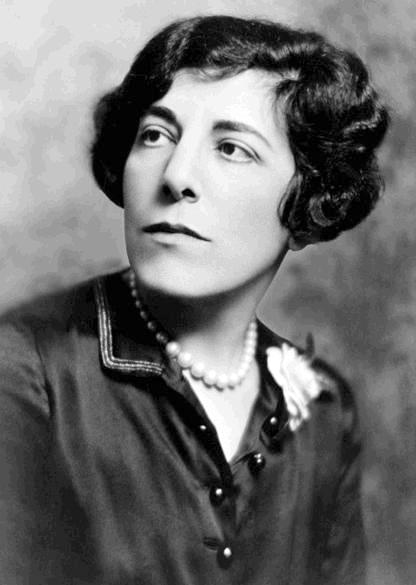
Edna Ferber

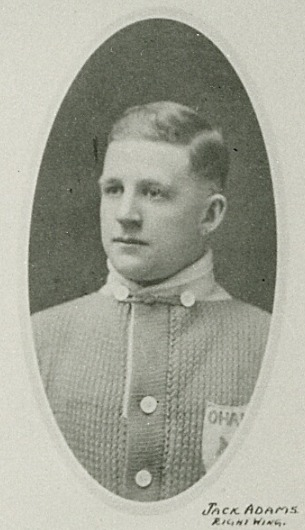
Jack Adams

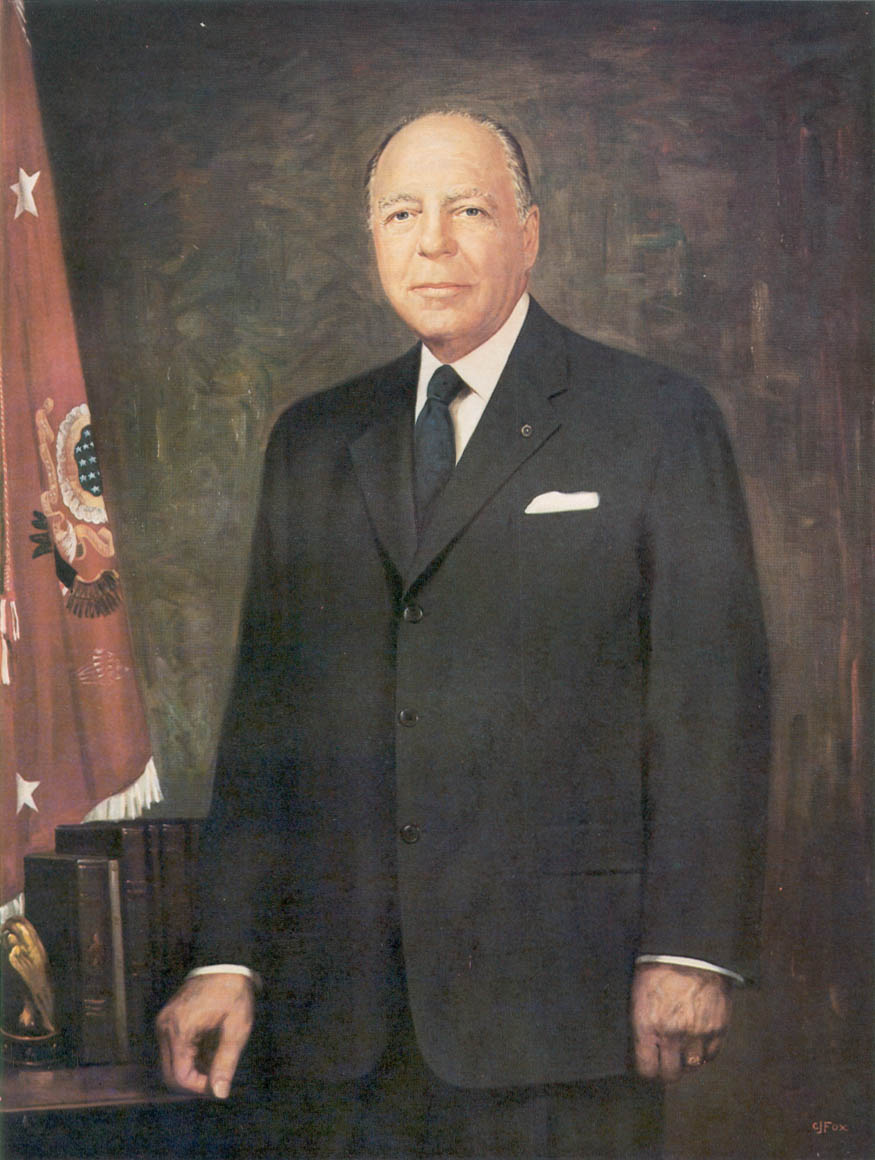
Wilber M. Brucker

== See also ==
- History of Michigan
- History of Detroit
