= 1969 in Michigan =

- Decades: 1940s; 1950s; 1960s; 1970s; 1980s
- See also: History of Michigan; Historical outline of Michigan; List of years in Michigan; 1969 in the United States

Events from the year 1969 in Michigan.

The Associated Press (AP) and United Press International (UPI) each selected the top 10 stories in Michigan for 1969, including the following:

1. The "Michigan murders", a series of six killings of young women between 1967 and 1969 in the Ann Arbor/Ypsilanti area climaxing with the August 1 arrest of John Norman Collins (AP-1, UPI-1);
2. An education reform plan proposed by Governor William Milliken (AP-2, UPI-2);
3. The debate over a proposal to provide public funding to parochial schools (AP-3, UPI-2);
4. William Milliken's succession of George W. Romney as Governor of Michigan following Romney's becoming United States Secretary of Housing and Urban Development (AP-4, UPI-3);
5. The New Bethel Church shootout between members of the Republic of New Africa and the Detroit Police Department on March 29 (AP-5, UPI-7);
6. The November 4 Detroit mayoral election in which Wayne County Sheriff Roman Gribbs narrowly defeated Wayne County auditor Richard H. Austin's bid to become the city's first African-American mayor (AP-6, UPI-6);
7. Henry Ford II's firing of Semon Knudsen as president of Ford Motor Company on September 11, only 18 months after Knudsen was hired away from General Motors (AP-7, UPI-5);
8. The October 17 appointment of Clifton R. Wharton Jr. as President of Michigan State University, the first African-American to head a major university (AP-8, UPI-8);
9. Controversy over sex education guidelines prepared by the Michigan Board of Education (UPI-4);
10. The murder trial and acquittal of Detroit police officer Ronald August arising out of the Algiers Motel incident (AP-9);
11. The emergence of Robert P. Griffin as a force in the United States Senate with his selection as whip (UPI-9);
12. The death of Dr. Leroy G. Augenstein, a member of the Michigan State Board of Education and a potential U.S. Senate candidate in 1970, in a private plane crash on November 8 (AP-10, UPI-10).

The UPI also selected the state's top 10 sports stories as follows:

1. The 1969 Ohio State vs. Michigan football game with Michigan upsetting undefeated and No. 1 ranked Ohio State on November 22;
2. The 1969 Michigan Wolverines football team tying for the Big Ten Conference championship and receiving the conference's berth to play in the 1970 Rose Bowl;
3. Spencer Haywood, basketball player at the University of Detroit, selected as an All-American and decided to turn pro;
4. The October 16 firing of Bill Gadsby as the Detroit Red Wings's coach with Sid Abel taking over coaching duties;
5. The August 10 firing of Johnny Sain as the Detroit Tigers' pitching coach after a public rift with manager Mayo Smith;
6. The first and last Michigan Golf Classic, held at the Shenandoah Golf and County Club, which became the first PGA Tour event in modern history to default on its obligation to pay purse money;
7. The 1969 Detroit Lions finishing with their best record since 1962;
8. Gordie Howe tallying a career-high 103 points at age 41;
9. The 1969 Detroit Tigers failing to repeat as American League champions and finishing in second place in the new American League East;
10. (tie) The September 10 death of Michigan State basketball coach John E. Benington from a heart attack in the coaches' locker room at Jenison Fieldhouse, and Dave Bing's September 2 announcement that he would leave the Detroit Pistons in 1971 to play for the Washington Capitols in the ABA.

In music, the year's highlights in Michigan included albums from Michigan bands Tommy James and the Shondells (featuring "Crimson and Clover" and "Crystal Blue Persuasion"), The Stooges (featuring "I Wanna Be Your Dog"), Bob Seger (featuring "Ramblin' Gamblin' Man"), the MC5 (Kick Out the Jams), Alice Cooper, and Grand Funk Railroad, and Motown's Hitsville U.S.A. continued to produce hit records by The Temptations ("I Can't Get Next to You"), Diana Ross & the Supremes ("Someday We'll Be Together"), Stevie Wonder ("My Cherie Amour"), The Jackson 5 ("I Want You Back"), and Marvin Gaye ("Too Busy Thinking About My Baby").

== Office holders ==
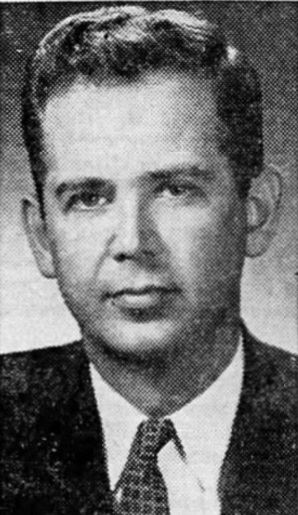
Gov. Milliken

=== State office holders ===
- Governor of Michigan: George W. Romney (Republican) (until January 22)/William Milliken (Republican) (starting January 22)
- Lieutenant Governor of Michigan: William Milliken (Republican) (until January 22)/Thomas F. Schweigert (acting, Republican)
- Michigan Attorney General: Frank J. Kelley (Democrat)
- Michigan Secretary of State: James M. Hare (Democrat)
- Speaker of the Michigan House of Representatives: William A. Ryan (Democrat)
- Majority Leader of the Michigan Senate: Emil Lockwood (Republican)
- Chief Justice, Michigan Supreme Court: Thomas E. Brennan

=== Mayors of major cities ===
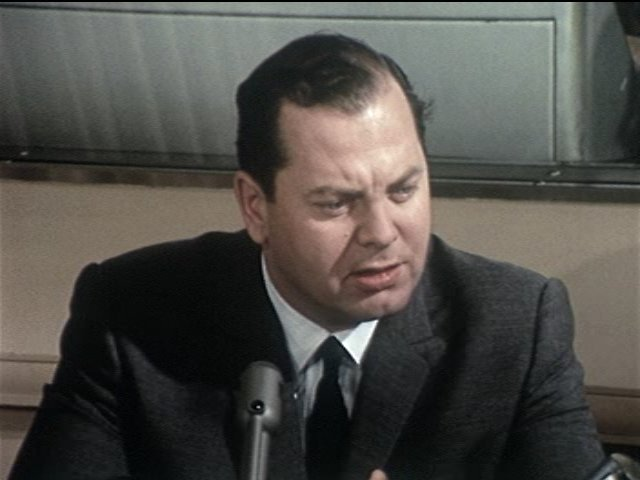
Mayor Cavanagh

- Mayor of Detroit: Jerome Cavanagh
- Mayor of Grand Rapids: C. H. Sonneveldt
- Mayor of Warren, Michigan: Ted Bates
- Mayor of Sterling Heights, Michigan: Gerald N. Donovan
- Mayor of Flint: Floyd J. McCree/Donald R. Cronin
- Mayor of Saginaw: Henry G. Marsh/Warren C. Light
- Mayor of Dearborn: Orville L. Hubbard
- Mayor of Lansing: Max E. Murninghan/Gerald W. Graves
- Mayor of Ann Arbor: Wendell Hulcher (Republican) / Robert J. Harris (Democrat)

=== Federal office holders ===
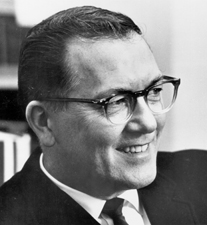
Sen. Griffin

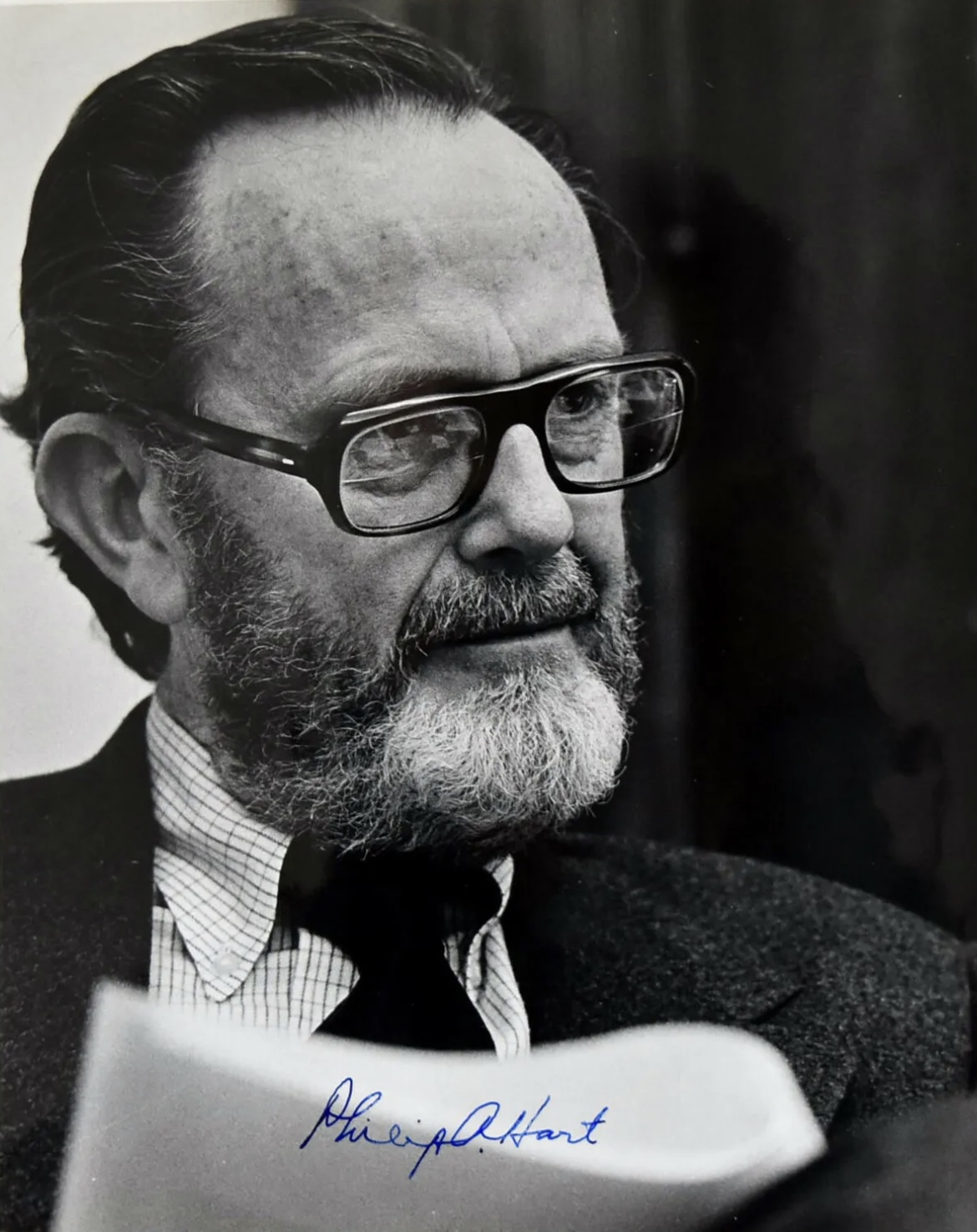
Sen. Hart

- U.S. Senator from Michigan: Robert P. Griffin (Republican)
- U.S. Senator from Michigan: Philip Hart (Democrat)
- House District 1: John Conyers (Democrat)
- House District 2: Marvin L. Esch (Republican)
- House District 3: Garry E. Brown (Republican)
- House District 4: J. Edward Hutchinson (Republican)
- House District 5: Gerald Ford (Republican)
- House District 6: Charles E. Chamberlain (Republican)
- House District 7: Donald W. Riegle Jr. (Republican)
- House District 8: R. James Harvey (Republican)
- House District 9: Guy Vander Jagt (Republican)
- House District 10: Elford Albin Cederberg (Republican)
- House District 11: Philip Ruppe (Republican)
- House District 12: James G. O'Hara (Democrat)
- House District 13: Charles Diggs (Democrat)
- House District 14: Lucien N. Nedzi (Democrat)
- House District 15: William D. Ford (Democrat)
- House District 16: John Dingell Jr. (Democrat)
- House District 17: Martha Griffiths (Democrat)
- House District 18: William Broomfield (Republican)
- House District 19: Jack H. McDonald (Republican)

== Population ==
In the 1960 United States census, Michigan was recorded as having a population of 7,823,194 persons, ranking as the seventh most populous state in the country. By 1970, the state's population had grown 13.4% to 8,875,083 persons.

=== Cities ===
The following is a list of cities in Michigan with a population of at least 60,000 based on 1960 U.S. Census data. Historic census data from 1950 and 1970 is included to reflect trends in population increases or decreases. Cities that are part of the Detroit metropolitan area are shaded in tan.

1960 Rank	City	County	1950 Pop.	1960 Pop.	1970 Pop.	Change 1960-70
1	Detroit	Wayne	1,849,568	1,670,144	1,514,063	−9.3% ▼
2	Flint	Genesee	163,143	196,940	193,317	−1.8% ▼
3	Grand Rapids	Kent	176,515	177,313	197,649	11.5% ▲
4	Dearborn	Wayne	94,994	112,007	104,199	−7.0% ▼
5	Lansing	Ingham	92,129	107,807	131,403	21.9% ▲
6	Saginaw	Saginaw	92,918	98,265	91,849	−6.5% ▼
7	Warren	Macomb	42,653	89,246	179,260	100.2% ▲
8	Pontiac	Oakland	73,681	82,233	85,279	3.7% ▲
9	Kalamazoo	Kalamazoo	57,704	82,089	85,555	4.1% ▲
10	Royal Oak	Oakland	46,898	80,612	86,238	7.0% ▲
11	St. Clair Shores	Macomb	19,823	76,657	88,093	14.9% ▲
12	Ann Arbor	Washtenaw	48,251	67,340	100,035	48.6% ▲
13	Livonia	Wayne	17,634	66,702	110,109	65.1% ▲
14	Dearborn Heights	Wayne	20,235	61,118	80,069	31.0% ▲
15	Westland	Wayne	30,407	60,743	86,749	42.8% ▲

=== Counties ===
The following is a list of counties in Michigan with populations of at least 100,000 based on 1960 U.S. Census data. Historic census data from 1950 and 1970 are included to reflect trends in population increases or decreases. Counties that are part of the Detroit metropolitan area are shaded in tan.

1960 Rank	County	Largest city	1950 Pop.	1960 Pop.	1970 Pop.	Change 1960-70
1	Wayne	Detroit	2,435,235	2,666,297	2,666,751	0.0% ▲
2	Oakland	Pontiac	396,001	690,259	907,871	31.5% ▲
3	Macomb	Warren	184,961	405,804	625,309	54.1% ▲
4	Genesee	Flint	270,963	374,313	444,341	18.7% ▲
5	Kent	Grand Rapids	288,292	363,187	411,044	13.2% ▲
6	Ingham	Lansing	172,941	211,296	261,039	23.5% ▲
7	Saginaw	Saginaw	153,515	190,752	219,743	15.2% ▲
8	Washtenaw	Ann Arbor	134,606	172,440	234,103	35.8% ▲
9	Kalamazoo	Kalamazoo	126,707	169,712	201,550	18.8% ▲
10	Berrien	Benton Harbor	115,702	149,865	163,875	9.3% ▲
11	Calhoun	Battle Creek	120,813	138,858	141,963	2.2% ▲
12	Jackson	Jackson	108,168	131,994	143,274	8.5% ▲
13	Muskegon	Muskegon	121,545	129,943	157,426	21.2% ▲
14	St. Clair	Port Huron	91,599	107,201	120,175	12.1% ▲
15	Bay	Bay City	88,461	107,042	117,339	9.6% ▲
16	Monroe	Monroe	75,666	101,120	118,479	17.2% ▲

== Sports ==
=== Baseball ===
- 1969 Detroit Tigers season – Under manager Mayo Smith, the Tigers compiled a 90–72 record and finished second in the American League East. The team's statistical leaders included Jim Northrup with a .295 batting average, Willie Horton with 28 home runs and 98 RBIs, Denny McLain with 24 wins, and Tom Timmermann with a 2.75 earned run average.
- 1969 Michigan Wolverines baseball team - Under head coach Moby Benedict, the Wolverines compiled a 14–21–1 record and finished third in the Big Ten Conference.

=== American football ===
- 1969 Detroit Lions season – The Lions, under head coach Joe Schmidt, compiled a 9–4–1 record and finished in second place in the NFL's Central Division. The team's statistical leaders included Bill Munson with 1,062 passing yards, Bill Triplett with 377 rushing yards, Charlie Sanders with 656 receiving yards, and Errol Mann with 101 points scored.
- 1969 Michigan Wolverines football team – Under head coach Bo Schembechler, the Wolverines compiled an 8–3 record and were ranked No. 9 in the final AP Poll. The team's statistical leaders included Don Moorhead with 1,261 passing yards, Billy Taylor with 864 rushing yards and 114 points scored, Jim Mandich with 662 receiving yards, and Garvie Craw with 78 points scored.
- 1969 Michigan State Spartans football team – Under head coach Duffy Daugherty, the Spartans compiled a 4–6 record. The team's statistical leaders included Bill Triplett with 715 passing yards, Don Highsmith with 937 rushing yards and 42 points scored, and Frank Foreman with 537 receiving yards.
- 1969 Central Michigan Chippewas football team – Under head coach Roy Kramer, the Chippewas compiled a 7–3 record.
- 1969 Eastern Michigan Hurons football team – Under head coach Dan Boisture, the Hurons compiled a 5–4 record.
- 1969 Western Michigan Broncos football team – Under head coach Bill Doolittle, the Broncos compiled a 4–6 record.

=== Basketball ===
- 1968–69 Detroit Pistons season – Under head coach Donnie Butcher, the Pistons compiled a 32–50 record. The team's statistical leaders included Dave Bing with 1,800 points and 546 assists and Happy Hairston with 959 rebounds.
- 1968–69 Michigan Wolverines men's basketball team – Under head coach Johnny Orr, the Wolverines compiled a 13–11 record. Rudy Tomjanovich led the team with 617 points and 340 rebounds.
- 1968–69 Detroit Titans men's basketball team – The Titans compiled a 16–10 record under head coach Bob Calihan. Spencer Haywood led the team with 771 points (32.1 points per game) and 530 rebounds.
- 1968–69 Michigan State Spartans men's basketball team – Under head coach John E. Benington, the Spartans compiled an 11–12 record.
- 1968–69 Western Michigan Broncos men's basketball team – Under head coach Clarence Sonny Means, the Broncos compiled an 11–13 record.

=== Ice hockey ===
- 1968–69 Detroit Red Wings season – Under head coach Bill Gadsby, the Red Wings compiled a 33–31–12 record and finished fifth in the National Hockey League's East Division. The team's statistical leaders included Frank Mahovlich with 49 goals and Gordie Howe with 59 assists and 103 points. The team's regular goaltenders were Roy Edwards and Roger Crozier.
- 1968–69 Michigan Tech Huskies men's ice hockey team – Under head coach John MacInnes, Michigan Tech compiled a 21–9–2 record and finished fourth at the 1969 NCAA Division I Men's Ice Hockey Tournament.
- 1968–69 Michigan Wolverines men's ice hockey season – Under head coach Al Renfrew, the Wolverines compiled a 16–12 record.
- 1968–69 Michigan State Spartans men's ice hockey team – Under head coach Amo Bessone, the Spartans compiled an 11–16–1 record.

=== Golf ===
- Buick Open – Dave Hill won the event.
- Michigan Open – Charles Knowles won the event.

=== Boat racing ===
- Port Huron to Mackinac Boat Race –
- Spirit of Detroit race –
- APBA Gold Cup –

=== Other ===
- 1969 NCAA Indoor Track and Field Championships – The fourth annual NCAA indoor championships were held at Cobo Arena in Detroit in March; Kansas won the team championship.
- 1969 Motor State 500 – Cale Yarborough was the winner of the race, part of the NASCAR Grand National Series, held on June 15 at the Michigan International Speedway in Brooklyn, Michigan.
- Yankee 600 – David Pearson was the winner of the race, also part of the NASCAR Grand National Series, held on August 17 at the Michigan International Speedway.

== Music ==
Michigan and/or Motown acts performed 14 of the songs ranked on the Billboard Year-End Hot 100 singles of 1969, as follows:

- "I Can't Get Next to You" by The Temptations (No. 3);
- "Crimson and Clover" by Tommy James and the Shondells (No. 10);
- "Crystal Blue Persuasion" by Tommy James and the Shondells (No. 12);
- "Too Busy Thinking About My Baby" by Marvin Gaye (No. 14);
- "What Does It Take (To Win Your Love)" by Junior Walker (No. 20);
- "My Cherie Amour" by Stevie Wonder (No. 32);
- "Baby, Baby Don't Cry" by The Miracles (No. 37);
- "Runaway Child, Running Wild" by The Temptations (No. 57);
- "Twenty-Five Miles" by Edwin Starr (No. 69);
- "That's the Way Love Is" by Marvin Gaye (No. 72);
- "Ramblin' Gamblin' Man" by The Bob Seger System (No. 86);
- "I'm Gonna Make You Love Me" by Diana Ross & the Supremes and The Temptations (No. 87);
- "I Heard It Through the Grapevine" by Mavin Gaye (No. 88); and
- "My Whole World Ended (The Moment You Left Me)" by David Ruffin (No. 97).

Albums released by Michigan and/or Motown acts in 1969 included the following:

- Crimson & Clover by Tommy James and the Shondells was released in January and reached No. 8 on the Billboard album chart. It featured the hit songs, "Crimson and Clover" (pop No. 1) and "Crystal Blue Persuasion" (pop No. 2).
- Ramblin' Gamblin' Man by The Bob Seger System was released in January. The single of the same title reached No. 17 on the Billboard Hot 100.
- Cloud Nine by The Temptations was released on February 17 and reached No. 4 on the Billboard album chart. It featured the hit songs, "Cloud Nine" (No. 2 R&B, No. 6 pop) and "Runaway Child, Running Wild" (No. 1 R&B, No. 6 pop).
- Kick Out the Jams by the MC5 was released in February. It was recorded live at Detroit's Grande Ballroom on October 30–31, 1968. The album was ranked No. 294 on Rolling Stone list of the "500 Greatest Albums of All Time".
- M.P.G. by Marvin Gaye was released on April 30 and reached No. 1 on the soul albums chart. It was recorded at the Hitsville U.S.A. studio in Detroit. It featured the hit songs, "Too Busy Thinking About My Baby" (R&B No. 1, pop No. 4) and "That's The Way Love Is" (No. 2 soul, No. 7 pop).
- Let the Sunshine In by Diana Ross & the Supremes was released on May 26 and reached No. 7 on the R&B albums chart. It featured the hit single, "I'm Livin' in Shame" (No. 10 pop).
- Pretties for You by Alice Cooper was released on June 30.
- The Stooges, the debut studio album from The Stooges, was released on August 5. The album was ranked at No. 185 on Rolling Stone list of the "500 Greatest Albums of All Time". The album included the single, "I Wanna Be Your Dog" which was ranked at No. 438 on Rolling Stone's list of the 500 Greatest Songs of All Time.
- My Cherie Amour by Stevie Wonder was released on August 29. It featured the hit songs, "My Cherie Amour (pop No. 4) and "Yester-Me, Yester-You, Yesterday" (pop No. 7, R&B No. 5).
- Puzzle People by The Temptations was released on September 23 and reached No. 5 on the pop albums chart. It featured the No. 1 single "I Can't Get Next to You".
- Cream of the Crop, the final regular album by The Supremes to feature Diana Ross, was released on November 3. The album featured "Someday We'll Be Together", the final No. 1 hit of the 1960s.
- Four in Blue by The Miracles was released on November 3 and reached No. 3 in the R&B albums chart.
- Diana Ross Presents The Jackson 5 by The Jackson 5 was released on December 18 and reached No. 5 on the pop albums chart and No. 1 on the R&B albums chart. Recorded at Motown's Hitsville U.S.A. studio in Detroit, the album featured the No. 1 hit single, "I Want You Back".
- Grand Funk, the second studio album by Grand Funk Railroad, was released on December 29 and reached No. 11 on the pop albums chart.

== Births ==
- January 1 – Verne Troyer, actor (Mini-Me in the Austin Powers film series), in Sturgis, Michigan
- March 18 – Mike Dumas, NFL safety (1991-2000), in Grand Rapids, Michigan
- April 19 – Dana Nessel, 54th Attorney General of Michigan
- June 6 – Erik Prince, former U.S. Navy SEAL officer and founder and former CEO and chairman of the government services and security company Blackwater USA, now known as Academi, in Holland, Michigan
- October 8 – Jeremy Davies, actor (Saving Private Ryan, Lost, Justified), in Traverse City, Michigan
- October 23 – Sanjay Gupta, neurosurgeon and CNN's Emmy Award-winning chief medical correspondent, in Novi, Michigan

=== Gallery of 1969 births ===
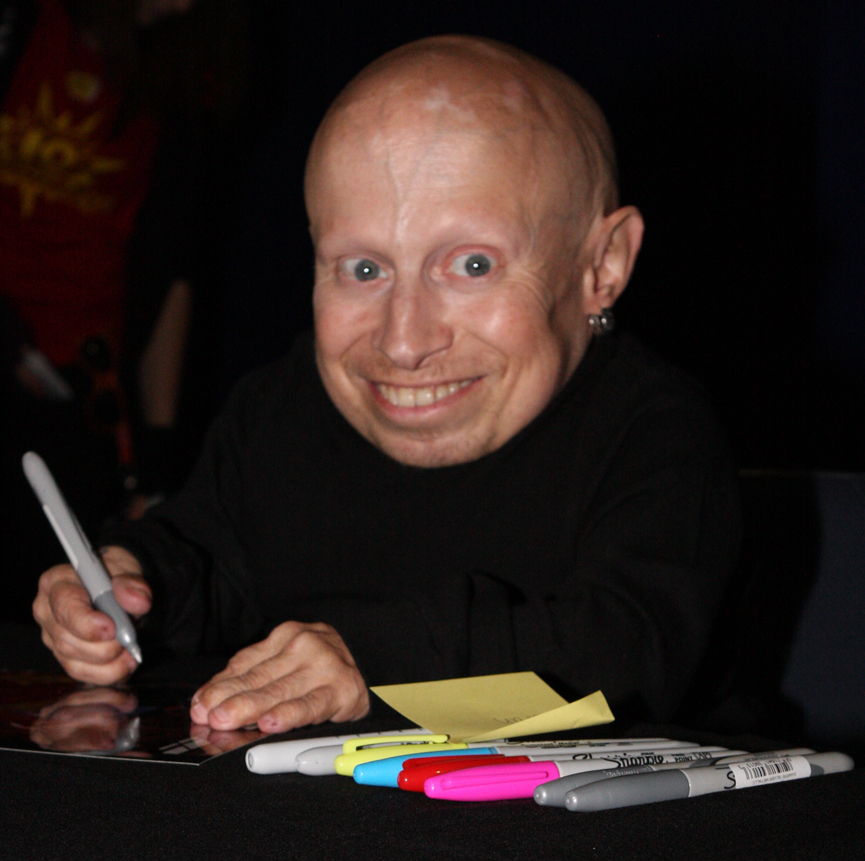
Verne Troyer

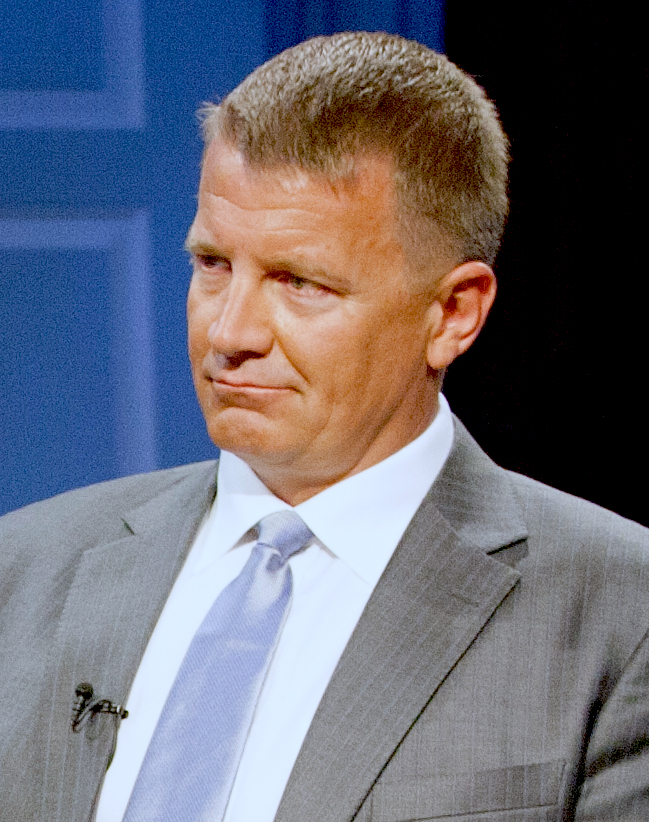
Erik Prince

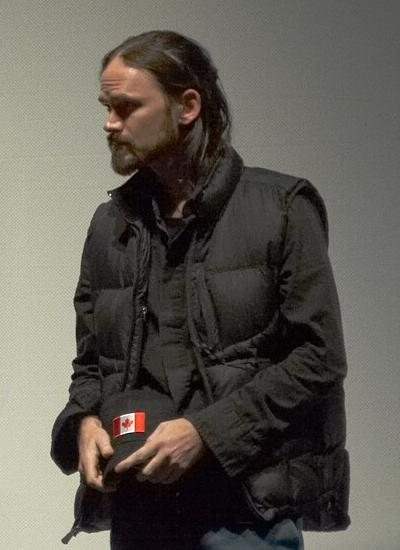
Jeremy Davies

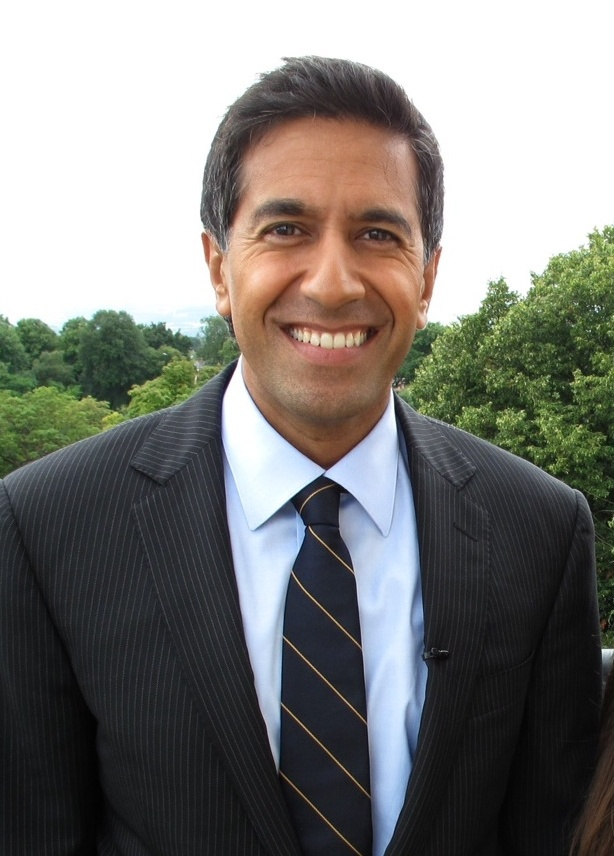
Sanjay Gupta

== Deaths ==
- January 28 – Jesse P. Wolcott, U.S. Congressman (1931–1957), at age 75
- April 10 – Alvin Morell Bentley, U.S. Congressman (1953-1961), at age 50 in Tucson, Arizona
- May 5 – Eddie Cicotte, Major League Baseball pitcher (1905-1920) banned from baseball due to the Black Sox scandal, at age 84 in Livonia, Michigan
- June 27 – Allen James Babcock, Bishop of Grand Rapids (1954-1969), at age 71
- October 6 – Walter Hagen, golfer with 11 professional majors championships, at age 76 in Traverse City, Michigan

=== Gallery of 1969 deaths ===
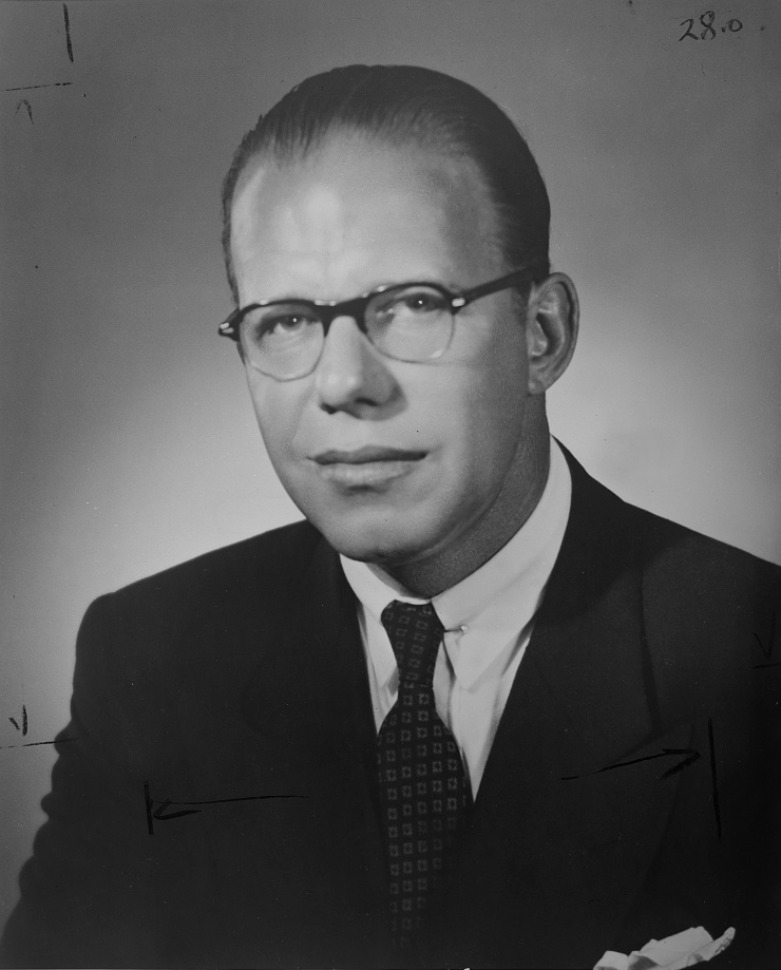
Alvin Morell Bentley

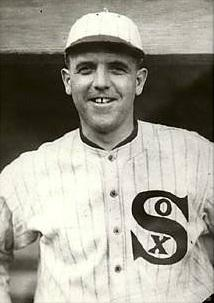
Eddie Cicotte

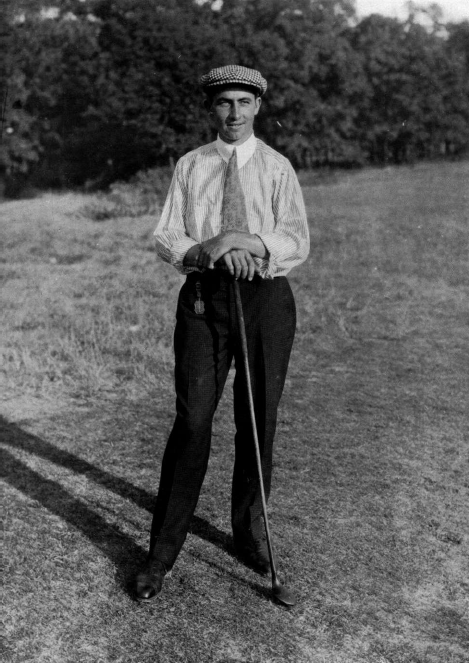
Walter Hagen

== See also ==
- History of Michigan
- History of Detroit
