= Moby Benedict =

American baseball player (1935–2022)

Milbry Eugene "Moby" Benedict
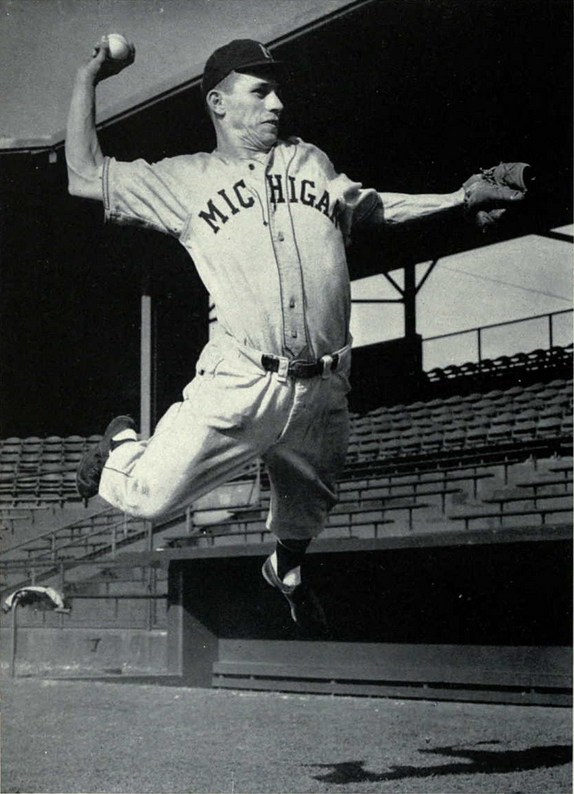
- Moby Benedict, 1956

Biographical details
- Born: March 29, 1935; Detroit, Michigan, U.S.
- Died: April 9, 2022 (aged 87); Tecumseh, Michigan, U.S.
- Education: University of Michigan

Playing career
- 1953–1956: Michigan
- 1957: Idaho Falls Russets
- 1958: Lancaster Red Roses
- 1959: Knoxville Smokies
- Position: Shortstop

Coaching career (HC unless noted)
- 1960-1962: Michigan (assistant)
- 1963–1979: Michigan
- 1982-1984: Jamestown Expos

Administrative career (AD unless noted)
- 1984: Michigan (Intramural sports director)

Head coaching record
- Overall: 367-251-5

Accomplishments and honors

Championships
- College World Series (1962, as assistant coach); 3× Big Ten (1975-1976, 1978)

Awards
- University of Michigan Athletic Hall of Honor (1994)

Milbry Eugene "Moby" Benedict (March 29, 1935 – April 9, 2022) was an American baseball shortstop and University of Michigan coach.

A native of Detroit, Michigan, Benedict played baseball and basketball at Detroit's Southeastern High School before attending the University of Michigan. He played for the Michigan Wolverines from 1953 to 1956 and played for the College World Series championship team in 1953. He played in the minor leagues in the late 1950s before accepting a position as assistant coach at the University of Michigan from 1960 to 1962. He was an assistant coach on the Wolverines' College World Series championship team in 1962, making him the only person to be a member of both of the school's national championship teams.

After winning the College World Series, Michigan's head coach the Detroit Tigers' minor league organization and recommended Benedict as his replacement. In 1963, Benedict took over as Michigan's head baseball coach. He spent 17 years as the Michigan head coach, compiling a record of 367-251-5. Michigan won three Big Ten Conference championships under Benedict (1975, 1976, and 1978) and finished in the top three in the Big Ten in 14 of Benedict's 17 years as head coach. The 1978 team, featuring Rick Leach and Steve Howe advanced to the College World Series in 1978, finishing fifth.

Benedict coached 25 future major league players as Michigan's head coach, including Leach, Howe, Elliott Maddox, Dave Campbell, Leon Roberts, Geoff Zahn and Lary Sorensen. Benedict retired as Michigan's coach after the 1979 season. He came out of retirement to manage the Montreal Expos' Class A minor league team, the Jamestown Expos, in the New York-Pennsylvania League, from 1982 to 1984. He subsequently became the director of intramural sports at the University of Michigan.

Michigan retired Benedict's uniform number (#1), only the second number retired by the school after Bill Freehan. In 1994, he was inducted into the University of Michigan Athletic Hall of Honor. Benedict died on April 9, 2022, at the age of 87.

== See also ==
- University of Michigan Athletic Hall of Honor
