= Byrd Spilman Dewey =

American novelist

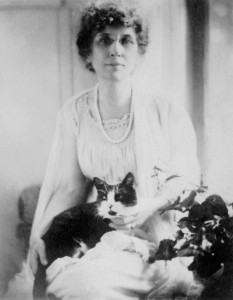
- Byrd Spilman Dewey, 1918
- Born: Julia Bird Spilman; February 16, 1856; Covington, Kentucky, U.S.
- Died: April 1, 1942 (aged 86); Jacksonville, Florida, U.S.
- Resting place: Greenlawn Cemetery
- Education: Sayre Institute
- Occupation: Writer
- Spouse: Fred S. Dewey
- Writing career
- Pen name: Aunt Judith Sunshine, Judith Sunshine, Aunt Judith, Judith Ray
- Language: English
- Period: 1887–1927
- Genres: Fiction, animal stories, Florida pioneer
- Notable works: Bruno, 1899

Byrd "Birdie" Spilman Dewey (née Julia Bird Spilman; February 16, 1856 – April 1, 1942) was an American author, land investor, and co-developer of the Town of Boynton. She lived in Florida from 1881 until her death in 1942. Her best known work, Bruno, told the Dewey's story of early pioneering days in central Florida. The book remained in print for over twenty years, classified as juvenile literature – today it better fits the classification of young adult literature.

Dewey was an important figure in pioneer South Florida history, adding philanthropy, and environmental conservation to her notable endeavors with her work in the Florida Audubon Society. In 2013 and 2017, she was a finalist for the Florida Women's Hall of Fame.

== Early life ==
Byrd Spilman Dewey was born Julia Bird Spilman in Covington, Kentucky, to Jonathan Edwards Spilman and Eliza Sarah Taylor. Her maternal great-grandfather was Colonel Richard Taylor, father of President Zachary Taylor. Mrs. Dewey's father was an attorney, composer and Presbyterian minister. He wrote the 19th-century song "Flow Gently Sweet Afton". Her mother died on August 10, 1866, as the result of a fire aboard the steamboat Bostona No. 3 in Maysville, Kentucky.

She attended school in Kentucky including Maysville College and the Sayre Institute (Sayre School) where she studied literature, music, art, and language skills. In 1877 she moved with her family to Salem, Illinois, to her father's next pastorate. It was there that she met Frederick Sidney Dewey; they were married on September 25, 1877. Fred was a distant cousin of Admiral George Dewey, and also of Melvil Dewey, the inventor of the Dewey Decimal System.

== Move to Florida ==
Because of Fred S. Dewey's respiratory ailments, contracted during his service in the American Civil War, the Deweys moved to Florida in 1881. They arrived in Jacksonville where they looked at properties in the St. Augustine area. They bought 20 acres (8.1 ha) of land in Zellwood intending to grow vegetables and raise an orange grove. By 1883 the land proved unsuitable for vegetables and the orange trees still needed years before reaching maturity. The Deweys sold the land and moved to Eustis where Fred took a bookkeeping position.

Life in Eustis was unsatisfying for the Deweys, so they moved back to Jacksonville, where Fred worked for the T.V. Cashen Lumber Company as a bookkeeper. In 1885 Byrd Spilman Dewey gave birth to Elizabeth Dewey (referred to as "Little Blossom" in Bruno) who died while an infant – the only child the Deweys ever bore.

In 1887 the Deweys heard of a new frontier opening to the south – the Lake Worth Country. The land surrounding Lake Worth, a 22-mile (35 km) long lagoon, was just beginning to open up for settlements. The Deweys filed a homestead claim for 76 acres (31 ha) of property one mile west of Lake Worth on Lake Mangonia. They cultivated about 2 acres (0.81 ha) in coconuts, tamarind, pineapple, avocado, sugar apple, and guava. Fred sailed across Lake Worth each day to the tiny settlement of Palm Beach to do bookkeeping or carpentry work.

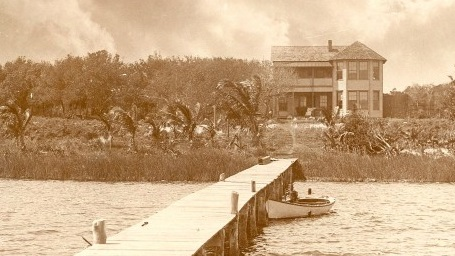
Ben Trovato, 1896, West Palm Beach, Florida

Byrd Spilman Dewey and Fred Dewey, 1885

== Writing career ==
Byrd Spilman Dewey's first known work appeared in the Florida Farmer and Fruit Grower newspaper in 1887. She contributed to the column "Our Home Circle" by Helen Harcourt under the pen name Aunt Judith Sunshine. She provided recipes and household tips on dealing with the harsh South Florida environment. In 1887 she published her first article in a national magazine, the Christian Union, entitled "On Toast".

She followed that article with others in the Christian Union such as "Our Perfect Home (suggested by What I Covet)" and "The Wall Furniture in Our Perfect Home"; under pen names of Judith Sunshine or Judith Ray. In the period between 1889 and 1895 she published a series of articles in Good Housekeeping, mostly short stories on a variety of moral and home topics.

In 1891, Dewey became the first columnist in Guy Metcalf's newspaper The Tropical Sun. She began publishing her weekly column "The Sitting Room" in April 1891 and wrote the column through September 1891. Her byline for the columns was "Aunt Judith". She also signed several poems, short stories, advice columns, and recipes with the initials J. S. The column featured housekeeping advice, philosophy on family and married life, and recipes suited for the tropical household.

In 1896, she published her first work under her own name in the Lake Worth Historian, a publication produced by the pioneer women of Lake Worth as a fundraiser for the Royal Poinciana Chapel.

Little, Brown & Company published her sentinel work, Bruno, in 1899. The book sold well across the country—more than 100,000 copies during its first year of publication—and was received well in national reviews. It was featured as a standard reader in several school catalogs around the United States. The book was autobiographical in nature, with Mrs. Dewey becoming the character of "Judith" and her husband the character of "Julius". That Bruno served as an autobiography was confirmed in the 2012 biography of the Deweys, Pioneering Palm Beach: The Deweys and the South Florida Frontier, where the authors were able to match land records and events to the book's storyline.

Her second book, The Blessed Isle and its Happy Families, was published in 1907 by the Press of the Record Company. This book told the stories of the cats and dogs that graced the Dewey home in West Palm Beach, Florida during the 1890s to early 1900s. The book had its genesis from a series of articles Mrs. Dewey published in Vogue magazine. The stories took place at Ben Trovato, the Dewey homestead on Lake Worth where they had moved following the sale of their 76 acres (31 ha) of property on Lake Mangonia. Her third book, From Pine Woods to Palm Groves, was published in 1909 in serialized form in The Florida Review, a Florida literary journal. This book is set at the beginning of the Dewey's adventures in the nascent Palm Beach County during the time from 1887 to 1893. Ben Trovato served as a focal point for national dignitaries including Henry Phipps, Richard Watson Gilder, and Mr. and Mrs. Woodrow Wilson.

Several of Dewey's recipes were included in the 1913 cookbook Economy Administration sponsored by the White House during the Wilson Administration. She continued to write, typically in short story form which she self-published in small pamphlets. Her last published work during her life was in the Florida Naturalist in 1927, titled "Some Bird Notes". In 2014, all of Mrs. Dewey's known works were compiled into one volume: The Collected Works of Byrd Spilman Dewey. Her cat and dog stories could be compared to the work of contemporary authors such as Gwen Cooper or John Grogran.

== Genesis of the Town of Boynton ==
As Dewey's authorship earnings increased, she began to invest in land in the exploding South Florida real estate market. In 1892 she purchased a tract of land, 160 acres (65 ha) at the south end of Lake Worth, from George H. K. Charters for US$700 (equivalent to $25,083 in 2025). In 1895 William S. Linton, a congressman from Saginaw, Michigan, offered her US$6,000 (equivalent to $232,200 in 2025) for her land. Linton had first toured South Florida that year with fellow Michigander Nathan Boynton, staying at the House of Refuge in Zion, Florida. Linton entered into a contract with the Deweys where he would pay them US$1,500 (equivalent to $58,050 in 2025) a year for four years. In 1897 Linton became insolvent. The Deweys filed a foreclosure lawsuit in August 1897 against Linton and Boynton. The case was settled out of court in October 1897 and the Deweys regained their land. The story of the Deweys' role in the founding of Boynton was featured in the Florida Legacy Productions documentary, Solving the Mystery of Birdie S. Dewey.

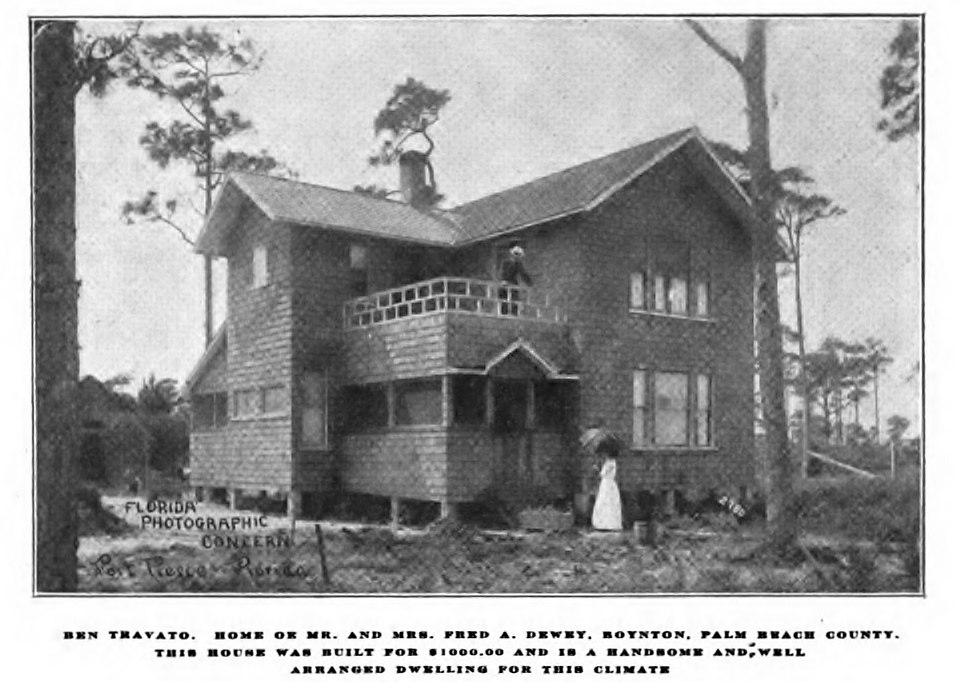
The Boynton, Florida Home of Byrd S. Dewey and Fred S. Dewey called Ben Trovato

Nathan Boynton was credited as the city's founding father although he never owned the town site land. When William S. Linton became insolvent, he had sold farm tracts and town lots and accepted money. The deeds he issued to homesteaders were worthless. When the 1897 lawsuit was settled, money that William S. Linton had collected was turned over to the Deweys and they issued deeds. William S. Linton had failed to file a legal plat for the town of Boynton. Frederick S. Dewey and Byrd Spilman Dewey filed the plat for the Town of Boynton in the Dade County courthouse on September 26, 1898. In addition, they filed a plat for "Dewey's Subdivision" which contained farming tracts. The Deweys built their first house in Boynton (called Spilman Cottage), using it as a weekend home. Adjacent to the home, Fred Dewey planted the first orange grove in Boynton along the coastal canal, where today's Sterling Village development stands. They donated lots for a Methodist church, donated the proceeds from lot sales to pave streets, and Mrs. Dewey donated a large portion of her personal library to start the town's first library, with the books held at the local post office. The Deweys built a second home in Boynton (called Ben Trovato) where they lived from 1909 to 1911. Health concerns forced them to move to Tennessee, where Mr. Dewey entered a Civil War soldier's home in Johnson City.

== Work with the Florida Audubon Society ==
After her husband's death in 1919, Dewey began to work with the Florida Audubon Society. In 1920 she was named the field secretary, making speeches and presentations around the state in the name of conservation, animal protection, and the creation of bird sanctuaries. She continued her work until her move to Jacksonville in 1928. She occasionally visited the Palm Beach area, until failing health no longer allowed her to travel.

== Inspiration for West Palm Beach Hotel and Resort ==
On February 13, 2020, a hotel opened on the West Palm Beach waterfront called The Ben. The 208-room hotel was inspired by the hospitality and home of Byrd Spilman Dewey and her estate Ben Trovato. Dewey's silhouette is featured in the resort's signature original artwork, showing her likeness painted onto the spines of antiquarian books. The Dewey portrait is also featured on the hotel's exclusive elevator to the top floor restaurant, bar and pool area.

The Ben, Hotel Elevator

Artwork featuring Byrd Spilman Dewey, The Ben Hotel

== Death ==
Spilman Dewey died in 1942 in Jacksonville, Florida, following a long illness. She was interred in the Greenlawn Cemetery in South Jacksonville. She died with few assets, but a long legal battle ensued between her nieces and nephews, and her caregiver. The case went to the Florida Supreme Court and was settled in 1944; the two parties split her assets.

== Honors ==
Byrd Spilman Dewey was a top 10 finalist for the Florida Woman's Hall of Fame in 2014 and 2017. The City of Boynton Beach renamed a city park in honor of the Deweys.

== Works ==
=== Periodical articles ===
- 1887 "On Toast" – The Christian Union
- 1887 "Our Perfect Home (Suggested by What I Covet)" – The Christian Union
- 1888 "The Wall Furniture in our Perfect Home" – The Christian Union
- 1889 "The Tyranny from the Other Side" – Good Housekeeping
- 1890 "At other people's convenience" – Good Housekeeping
- 1890 "A suitable Christmas Present" – Good Housekeeping
- 1892 "You ought to know" – Good Housekeeping
- 1895 "A village tragedy" – Good Housekeeping
- 1895 "Who Seeks Finds" – St. Nicholas Magazine (under pen name Judith Ray)
- 1904 "The Happy Families" (series of four articles) – Vogue
- 1913 "Recipes of Mrs. Byrd Spilman Dewey" – The Economy Administration Cook Book
- 1927 "Some Bird Notes" – The Florida Naturalist

=== Newspaper articles ===
- 1891 "The Sitting Room" – The Tropical Sun
- 1909 "Back Home" – The Maysville Public Ledger
- 1914 "We are Ready for Vote" – The Maysville Public Ledger

=== Short stories ===
- 1896 "A Lake Worth Romance"
- 1907 "Peter the Tramp"
- 1907 "Rebecca: A postscript to Bruno"
- 1911 "Flying Blossom"
- 1913 "Tale of Satan"
- 1914 "O Youth Eternal"
- 1917 "Who Seeks Finds"

=== Books ===
- 1899 Bruno
- 1907 The Blessed Isle and its Happy Families
- 1909 From Pine Woods to Palm Groves
- 2014 The Collected Works of Byrd Spilman Dewey ISBN 978-1494892333
- 2015 Bruno – A New Edition ISBN 978-1507563151
- 2016 From Pine Woods to Palm Groves – A New Edition ISBN 978-1530402632
- 2020 The Blessed Isle and its Happy Families – A New Edition ISBN 978-1981336326
