= Henry M. Youmans =

American politician (1832–1920)

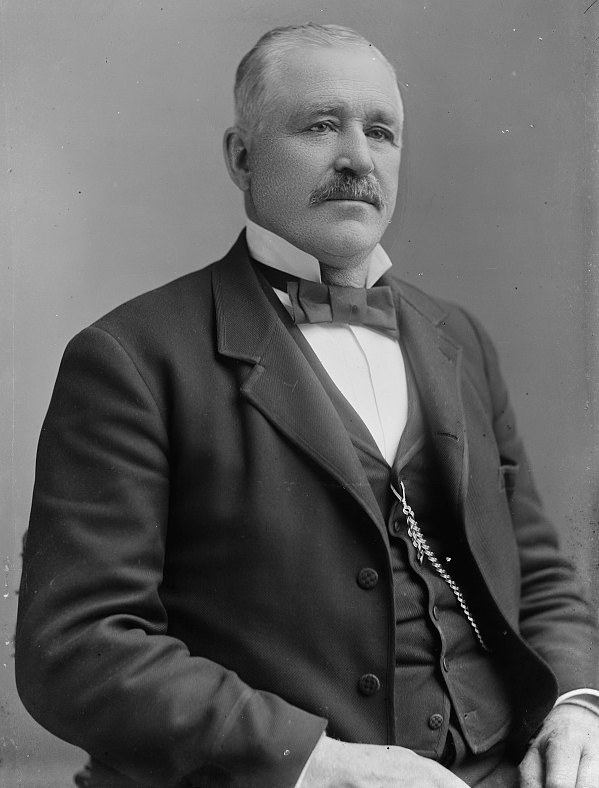

Member of the U.S. House of Representatives from Michigan's 8th district
- In office March 4, 1891 – March 3, 1893
- Preceded by: Aaron T. Bliss
- Succeeded by: William S. Linton

Member of the Michigan Senate from the 22nd district
- In office 1897–1898
- Preceded by: Emory Townsend
- Succeeded by: John Leidlein

Mayor of East Saginaw
- In office 1886-1887
- Preceded by: John S. Estabrook
- Succeeded by: William B. Baum

Personal details
- Born: May 15, 1832 Otego, New York
- Died: July 8, 1920 (aged 88) Saginaw, Michigan
- Resting place: Brady Hill Cemetery
- Party: Democratic
- Profession: Lumber Manufacture

Henry Melville Youmans (May 15, 1832 – July 8, 1920) was an American businessman and politician from the U.S. state of Michigan, serving one term in the U.S. House of Representatives from 1891 to 1893.

== Biography ==
Youmans was born in Otego, New York, and attended the common schools. He was in the employ of the York & Erie Railroad Co. on the Susquehanna division for ten years. He moved to East Saginaw, Michigan, in 1862 and engaged in the manufacture of lumber and salt from 1863 to 1878. He moved to St. Clair County in 1878 and engaged in farming and lumbering until 1884 when he returned to East Saginaw.

=== Political career ===
Youmans served as mayor of East Saginaw in 1886 and 1887, and also served four terms as alderman.

In the general election of 1890, Youmans ran as the candidate of the Democratic Party and defeated incumbent Republican Aaron T. Bliss to be elected from Michigan's 8th congressional district to the 52nd United States Congress, serving from March 4, 1891, to March 3, 1893. He was chairman of the Committee on Expenditures on Public Buildings. He was an unsuccessful candidate for reelection in 1892, losing to Republican William S. Linton. He was also unsuccessful against Joseph W. Fordney in 1902.

After leaving Congress, Henry M. Youmans became a member of the Michigan Senate (22nd district) in 1897 and 1898.

=== Later career and death ===
He engaged in agricultural pursuits in Bridgeport, Michigan, until his death in Saginaw, where he was interred in Brady Hill Cemetery.

U.S. House of Representatives
Preceded by Aaron T. Bliss	United States Representative for the 8th congressional district of Michigan; 1891 – 1893	Succeeded by William S. Linton
