= Joe Stephens (mayor) =

American politician

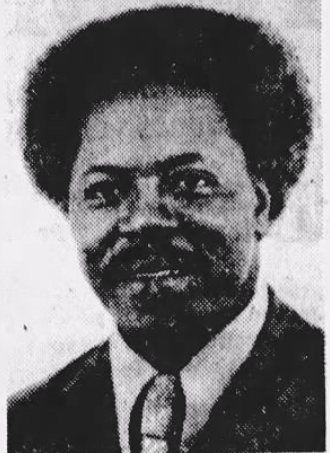

Mayor of Saginaw, Michigan
- In office November 14, 1977 – November 12, 1979
- Preceded by: Raymond M. Tortora
- Succeeded by: Paul P. Prudhomme

City Council of Saginaw, Michigan
- In office 1973–1977
- In office 1980–1985

Personal details
- Born: Sylvester Stephens; 1934/1935
- Died: February 1, 2022 (age 86)
- Party: Democratic
- Spouse: Mary C. Stephens
- Children: 3
- Education: Michigan State

Sylvester "Joe" Stephens (born 1934/1935 – February 1, 2022) was an American politician who served as the second African-American mayor of Saginaw, Michigan.

== Biography ==
Known as "Joe", Sylvester Stephens was originally from Columbus, Georgia. He later moved to Saginaw where his sister lived and in 1957, joined the Saginaw Police Force where he served as a liaison between the city schools and the police department. He served during the 1967 Saginaw riot when the city had its first African-American mayor, Henry G. Marsh.

=== Political career ===
In 1973, he was elected to the Saginaw City Council and was named Mayor on November 14, 1977. Saginaw has a weak mayor form of government where the mayor does not have the power to hire and fire employees or issue a veto. During his term, he was able to fully integrate the police force, developed a citizen participation framework where the councilors would hold fact-finding meetings at the city's 25 schools, implemented a city income tax (which was capped in 1979), tore down vacant buildings, and secured federal funding for urban development although he was unable to stem the flow of people to the suburbs. He served his term as mayor until November 12, 1979. The city council was unable to decide on his replacement until December 10, 1979, when Paul P. Prudhomme was chosen. He served as city councilor until 1985.

=== Post-political career ===
He served as president of the Michigan Municipal League from 1984 to 1985. Stephens later went on to serve as an executive at General Motors.

== Personal life ==
He married his high school sweetheart, Mary C. Stephens; they had three daughters. Stephens died on February 1, 2022.
