= Boynton Woman's Club =

- U.S. National Register of Historic Places
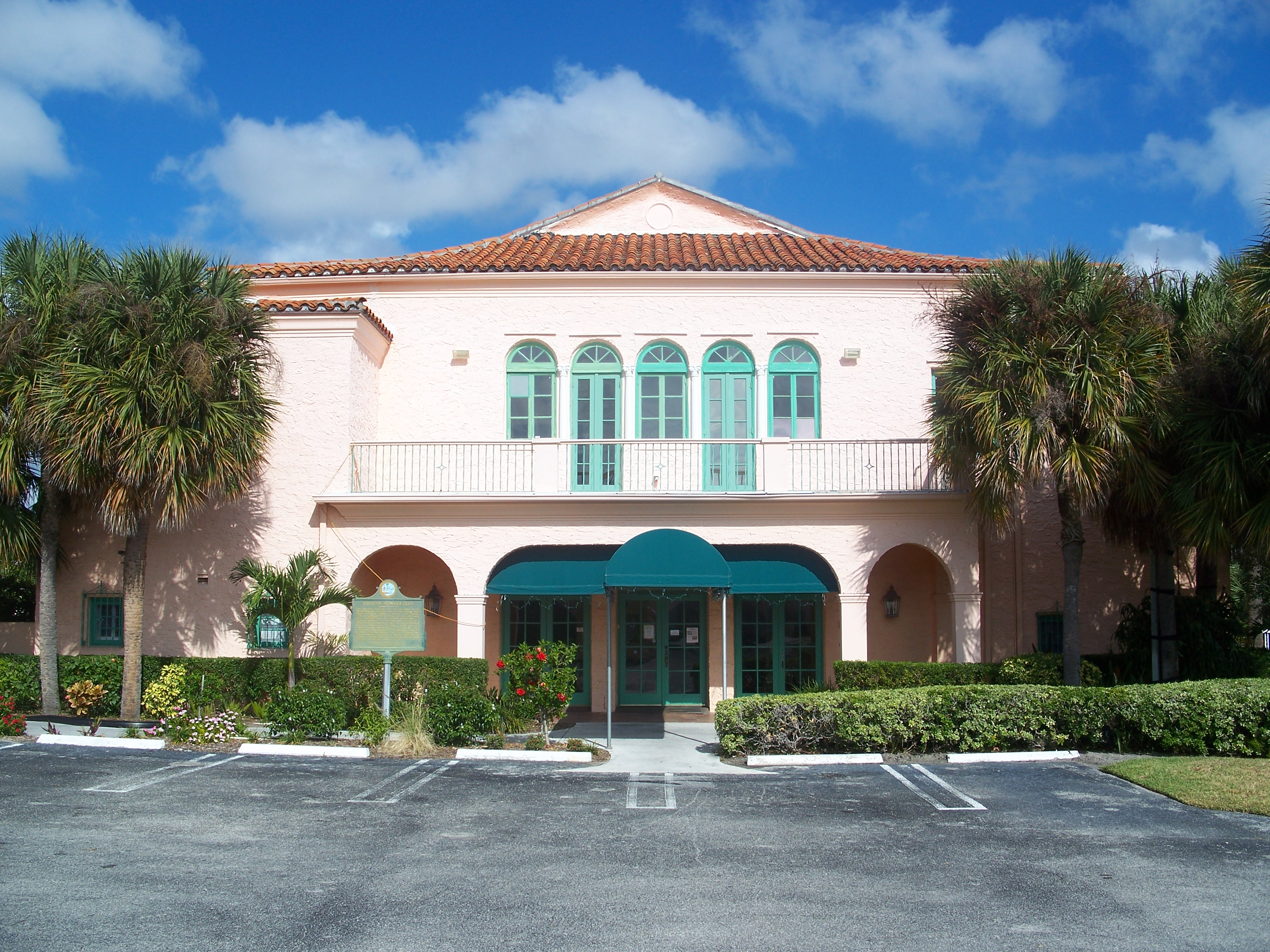

- Location within Florida Location within the United States
- Location: Boynton Beach, Florida
- Coordinates: 26°31′7″N 80°3′30″W
- NRHP reference No.: 79000686
- Added to NRHP: April 26, 1979

The Boynton Woman's Club is a historic woman's club in Boynton Beach, Florida. Their 1925 building, located at 1010 South Federal Highway, was designed by South Florida architect Addison Mizner and constructed as a memorial to Major Nathan Smith Boynton through a $35,000 donation from the founder's family. It is Mizner's only known architectural project in Boynton Beach. The building provided numerous community services throughout its history, including serving as a hurricane shelter, Boynton Beach's first full-service library, a USO center for the Red Cross throughout World War II, and a meeting place for other organizations.

On April 26, 1979, the Boynton Woman's Club was listed on the National Register of Historic Places. Some modifications have been made to the structure, especially in 1986, when the roof, first-story flooring, air conditioning system, and plumbing were repaired or replaced, while an elevator was added. Currently, the building is owned by the Boynton Beach Community Redevelopment Agency.

== History and description ==
In 1908, local women with civic interests began organizing a woman's club in Boynton Beach, which initially met at a frame schoolhouse. One year later, the Boynton Woman's Club was formally established and then incorporated in 1911 upon joining the Florida Federation of Women's Clubs. The Boynton Woman's Club moved into their first permanent building in 1912, a two-story, $10,000 structure constructed from lumber retrieved from shipwrecks and located at 502 E. Ocean Avenue. Although the woman's club fully paid the mortgage within a decade, the organization began outgrowing this clubhouse, which they also shared with Boynton Beach's only library at the time. In 1924, members of the club sold this structure for $10,000 and agreed to use the funds towards opening a new building.

As the relatives of town founder Major Nathan Smith Boynton planned on ways to memorialize him, his four children agreed to contribute $35,000 for a larger Boynton Woman's Club building. The club contracted South Florida architect Addison Mizner for its designs and the Heaton and Adams firm for its construction, a $50,000 project. Although Mizner designed many structures in surrounding areas, this structure is his only known project in Boynton Beach. In 1926, the Boynton Woman's Club was completed but not dedicated until 1932. Located at 1010 South Federal Highway, the structure's steel frame was also not finished until the late 1930s. The first floor contains four rooms, including a dining-card room, kitchen, and library, while the second floor includes an auditorium, bathrooms, and a foyer.

Shortly after construction finished, the building was used as a shelter for residents during the 1926 Miami hurricane. It was also utilized by the Red Cross as a USO center throughout World War II for dances and fundraisers. In the 1950s, the Boynton Woman's Club also initiated the first full-service public library in Boynton Beach, though African American residents were not allowed in the Woman's Club during this time. A modification occurred in 1959 due to the widening of Federal Highway: the removal of a stairwell and a bay on the west gallery. In 1961, the city purchased a residential building at 116 S. Seacrest Boulevard to serve as the municipal library, officially moving the collections out of the Woman's Club building.

On April 26, 1979, the 1925 building was added to the U.S. National Register of Historic Places and underwent a significant renovation in 1986, funded, in part, by the Mizner Foundation. This renovation repaired and/or replaced the roof, downstairs flooring, air conditioning system, and plumbing, as well as installed an elevator. The building was sold to the Boynton Beach Community Redevelopment Agency (CRA) in 2017 but was officially transferred to the CRA in 2021. In the interim, the CRA led several renovation efforts, most notably “substantial work on a roof damaged by Hurricane Irma.”

== See also ==
- List of Registered Historic Woman's Clubhouses in Florida
- National Register of Historic Places listings in Palm Beach County, Florida
