= Paul H. Wendler =

American politician

Paul Henry Wendler

17th Mayor of Saginaw
- In office April 12, 1971 – November 13, 1973
- Preceded by: Warren C. Light
- Succeeded by: William F. Nelson, Jr.

Personal details
- Born: March 8, 1917 Grand Rapids, Michigan
- Died: March 13, 2013 (aged 96) Saginaw, Michigan
- Resting place: Roselawn Memorial Gardens
- Spouse: Phoebe (nee Gardner)
- Children: Paul, Anne, and Gretchen (deceased)
- Parent(s): Paul Adolf Wendler and Anna M. Oseenbrink

Paul H. Wendler (March 9, 1917 – March 13, 2013) was a politician from Michigan, United States, who served as Mayor of Saginaw, as well as on the city council, and was a noted community philanthropist who was instrumental in bringing hockey to the city.

== Early life ==
Wendler was born on March 9, 1917, in Grand Rapids, Michigan, to Paul and Anna Wendler. He married the former Phoebe Gardner in August 1941 and moved to Saginaw that year. He worked at a General Motors plant there, as manager for 14 years, and as director of purchasing and quality control for 12 years, before his retirement in 1982.

== Politics ==
Encouraged by his bosses at GM, Wendler ran for and served on Saginaw City Council for 14 years, and was mayor from 1971 to 1973. During his tenure, he was instrumental in both the construction of what is now the Dow Event Center (then the Saginaw Civic Center) and in bringing a hockey team to the city.

=== Civic center ===
Following the condemnation and impending demolition of the old Saginaw Auditorium, the question of whether to build a new civic center in downtown was put on the ballot. After being rejected once, a provision was added to pave several roads on the city's east side and the question put to the voters again, successfully, in 1972.

== Hockey in Saginaw ==
Wendler and Canadian businessman and hockey coach Wren Blair were key to bringing hockey to Saginaw. The Saginaw Gears of the former International Hockey League played in Saginaw for 11 years, from 1972 to 1983, winning two Turner Cup championships (1977 and 1981).

Following this incarnation of the Gears, which ended in 1983, several other hockey teams played in Saginaw in the 1980s and 1990s, including the Generals ('85-'87), Hawks ('87-'89), Wheels ('94-'96), Lumber Kings ('96-'98), and a second incarnation of the Gears ('98-'99).

In the late 1990s and early 2000s, Wendler, Blair, and local businessman Richard J. Garber brought an Ontario Hockey League franchise, the Saginaw Spirit, to the city. The arena in which the Spirit play was named for Wendler in 1972, and Garber later called Wendler the "father of hockey" in the region.

== Civic and conservation involvement ==
Wendler was a trustee and vice president of the Frank N. Andersen Foundation, the Saginaw Valley State University Foundation, a member of two crime commissions, the Saginaw Rotary Club, and the Boy Scouts of America.

In 1978, he received an Honorary Doctor of Laws degree from Saginaw Valley State University. He was a supporter of the institution from its founding in 1963, and had served as the chairman of multiple fund drives and on several college committees.

Wendler was an active part of many conservation organizations and causes. He was part of the Saginaw Field and Stream Club, and played roles in the Michigan United Conservation Clubs, the National Wildlife Federation, the National Grouse Society, and Trout Unlimited, and received many awards for his work. Wendler also served as a member of the Michigan Natural Resources Commission and as an adviser to former Interior Secretary James G. Watt. Wendler's efforts helped secure a donation by the Dow Chemical Company to improve fish passage on the Tittabawassee River around a dam owned by Dow.

== Family ==
Apart from being married to Phoebe he had three children.
