= Church of Our Savior (Boynton Beach, Florida) =

Church in Boynton Beach, Florida

Church of Our Savior, MCC
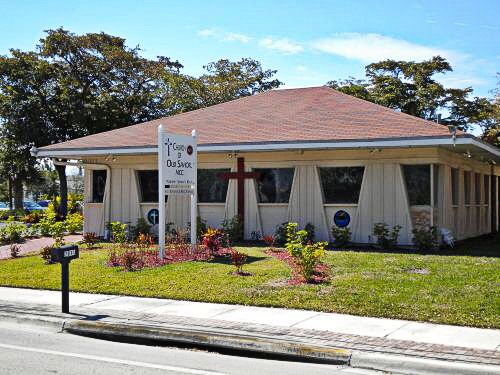

Religion
- Affiliation: Metropolitan Community Church
- Rite: Protestant
- Ecclesiastical or organisational status: Church
- Leadership: Rev. Tony Viglione, Pastor
- Year consecrated: 1997

Location
- Location: 2011 S. Federal Highway; Boynton Beach
- State: Florida
- Interactive map of Church of Our Savior, MCC
- Coordinates: 25.75753°N 80.19286°W

Architecture
- Type: Restaurant

Website
- https://www.churchofoursaviormcc.org

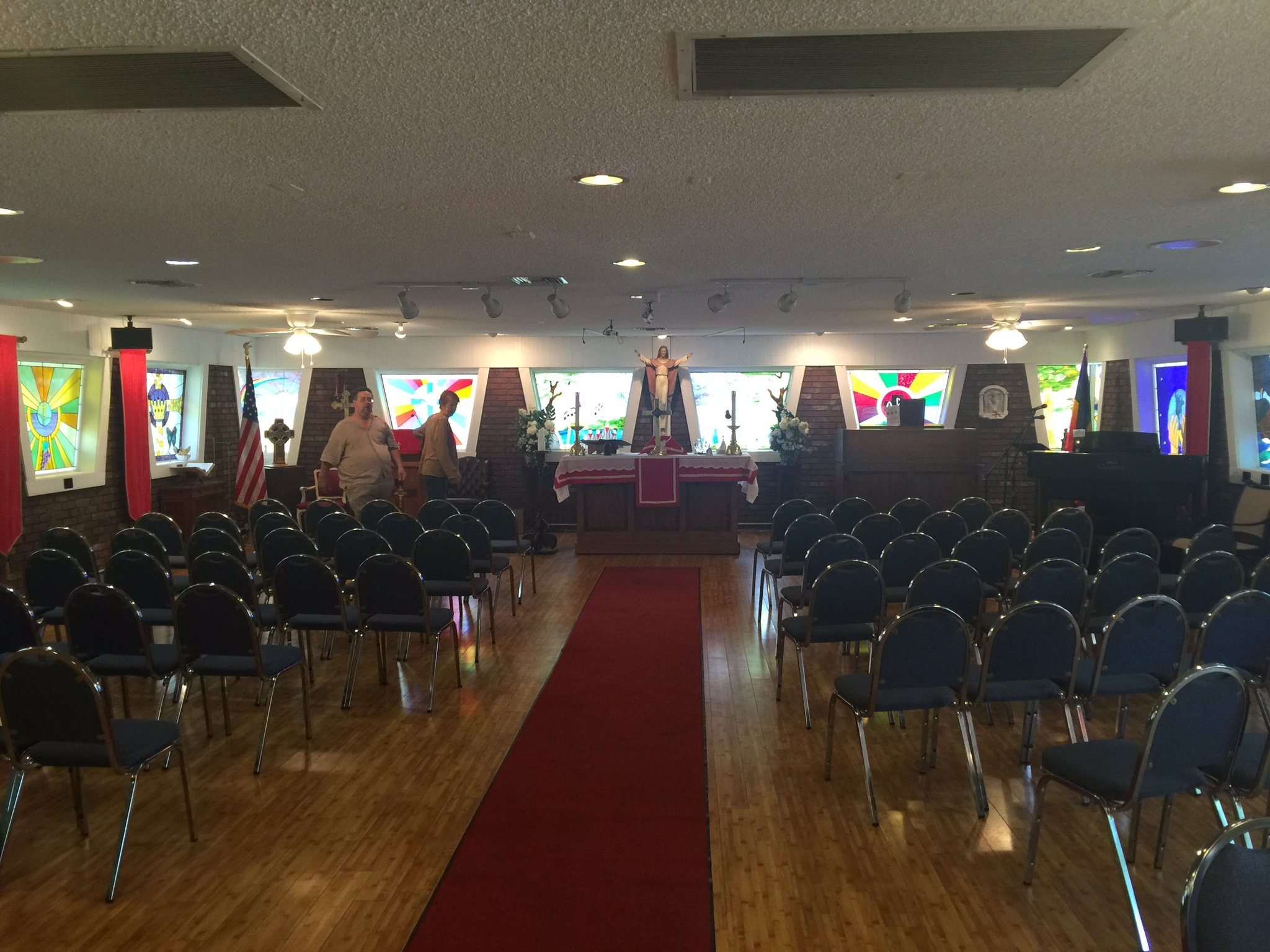
Interior of Church of Our Savior, MCC

Church of Our Savior, MCC, is located at 2011 S. Federal Highway, Boynton Beach, Florida. It is affiliated with the Metropolitan Community Church, a Protestant denomination with special outreach to the LGBTQ community. Like other MCC churches, it celebrates the Eucharist once a week, and practices open communion, meaning that recipients need not be a member of it or any other church to participate.

According to former pastor Renwick Bell, "MCC churches traditionally are a mixture of many faith traditions.... At Church of Our Savior we attempt to reach each and every person on their faith journey. We appreciate the diversity of faith traditions represented by our congregants and we attempt to touch each of these very special traditions at some time during our worship." Many members have experienced rejection from families or other churches and according to Rev. Wendy Woodruff, "we want them to know this is a place of refuge, a place of sanctuary, that they don't have to fear being here." According to her, "I feel called to serve the community as a whole, as well as the church community. We are called to carry the message of God's love for ALL, regardless of gender identity, sexual orientation, race, language, abled-ness, country of birth, or any of the many things that draw us apart."

== Pastors ==
Pastors of Church of Our Savior have been:

- John F. Jacobs (1993–1996)
- Mike Nikolaus (1995–1996) (acting)
- Tyrone Sweeting (1997–2004)
- Ana Vargas (2004–2005) (interim)
- Renwick Bell (2005–2014) Reverend Bell, a church member since 1991, was the church organist for several years before attending divinity school, after which he became the church pastor.
- Jack Copas (2015–2017) (interim)
- Wendy Woodruff (2017–2019)
- Rick Rhen-Sosbe (2019–2020) (provisional)

Vivien "Miss Vicki" Keller was long-term Choir Director.

== History ==
The Church of Our Savior, MCC, began in 1990 as a satellite extension of the Church of the Holy Spirit, now the Sunshine Cathedral, in Fort Lauderdale, to accommodate worshippers from northern Broward and southern Palm Beach counties. The first service was held in a rented space in Boca Raton (4770 NW 2nd Avenue) in the fall of 1990, and the church was chartered by MCC in 1992.

Finding a permanent home was the primary task of the church in its first years. At one point building a church with a separate "activity building" or "church hall" was considered, but instead the church in 1997 acquired a former Pizza Hut building to use as its sanctuary. Most of the renovation work was done by congregation members.

== Stained-glass windows ==
A unique set of stained-glass windows fill the former restaurant windows. 12 of the 14 were created by McMow Art Glass in Lake Worth, Florida, the other two by a member of the congregation for whom stained glass was a hobby. In five of them a rainbow appears; in the LBTGQ community the colors of the rainbow represent inclusiveness of the wide variety of human beings.
