= Sayre School =

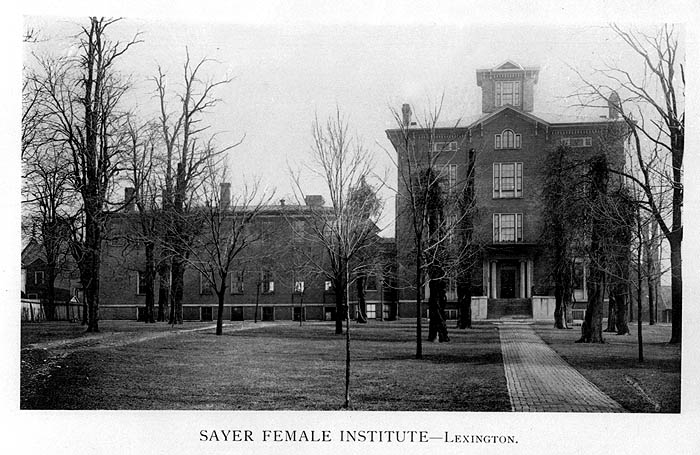

Location
- Lexington, Kentucky; United States; 38.048°N 84.494°W

Information
- Type: Independent, Private
- Motto: "Make Your Mark."
- Established: 1854
- Head of School: Stephen Manella
- Enrollment: 610 total (PS-12)
- Average class size: 14 students
- Student to teacher ratio: 7:1
- Campus: Urban; 10 buildings
- Athletics: 40 sports teams offered at the Varsity, Junior Varsity and Middle School level (grades 6-12)
- Mascot: Spartan
- Website: sayreschool.org

Sayre School is an independent, private, co-educational school in Lexington, Kentucky, US. The school enrolls 610 students from age two through twelfth grade. It has 68 full-time faculty members.

It has been listed on the National Register of Historic Places under the name "Sayre Female Institute" since 1982.

== History ==
David A. Sayre, a New Jersey silversmith, migrated to Lexington where he eventually became a successful banker. He and his wife Abby founded the school as an all-female boarding school in November 1854 when he met with a group of businessmen in the offices of former Kentucky Secretary of State George B. Kinkead. Along with several other prominent members of the "McChord" (now First) Presbyterian Church, including John C. Breckinridge, the group drew up the school's articles of incorporation.

In the fall of 1855, the school was moved to its current location on Limestone Street.

The school remained an all-female boarding school until 1876, when boys were admitted as day scholars in the primary grades under the leadership of Major Henry B. McClelland, who was the school's principal from 1870 to 1904. In 1914, the nearby preparatory school of Miss Ella M. Williams merged with Sayre, and the name was changed to Sayre College and Conservatory of Music. During the Great Depression, the school struggled, but in 1942 it grew with the incorporation of the Hamilton Grammar School, and changed its name to Sayre School, dropping its collegiate degree program. The pillars outside the main entrance of the campus still show "Sayre College." In 1947 the high school grades were discontinued, and the boarding rooms were leased to the University of Kentucky. In 1961 an English teacher from Lafayette High School, Donn D. Hollingsworth, was appointed headmaster and the high school was reinstated, in addition to the grammar school, beginning the "New Era."

In March–April 2017, Sayre begun the demolition and reconstruction of the lower (elementary) school, only finishing in summer of 2018.

== Academics ==
The Sayre School consists of three academic divisions, covering ages 2 through grade 12. The Lower School consists of a preschool program for ages 2–5, as well as Kindergarten through Grade 4. The Middle School covers grades 5–8, and the Upper School incorporates grades 9–12, like a traditional high school. The Upper School offers 21 Advanced Placement courses, and 85% of seniors who took an AP class earned a score of 3 or higher, with 61% being designated as AP Scholars.

== Notable alumni ==
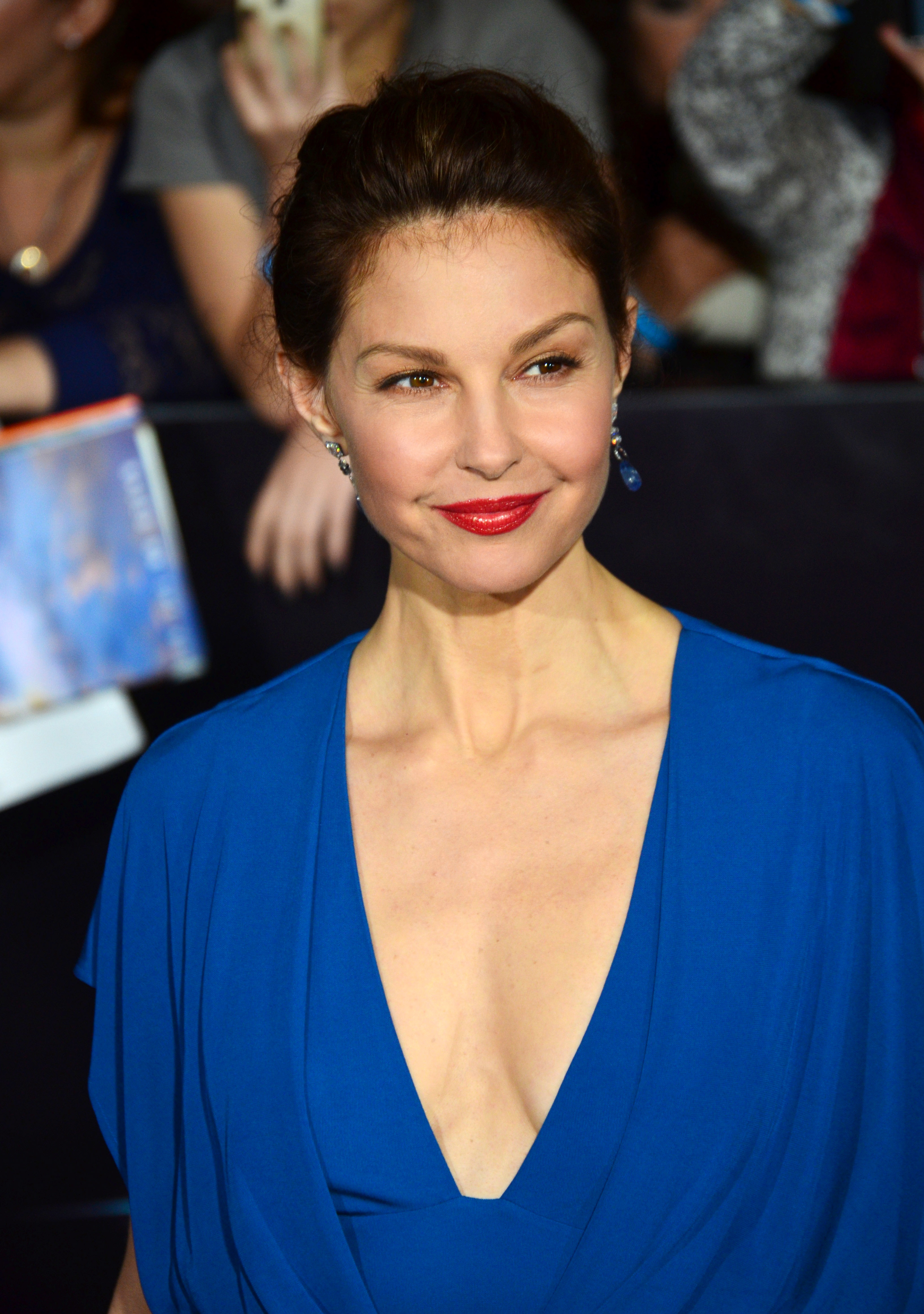
Actress Ashley Judd attended Sayre.

Notable past Sayre students include Nobel Laureate William Lipscomb, woman suffragist Laura Clay, settlement school founder Katherine Pettit, Josh Hopkins, Byrd Spilman Dewey, pro tennis player Susan Sloane, and actresses Ashley Judd, Leah Lail, and Audrey Zahn.

== Athletics ==
Sayre's sports teams are called the Spartans. Their school colors are blue and gold. Notably, the school has a "no-cut" policy for its sports teams, meaning that any student can participate on an athletic team, regardless of ability, if he or she wishes to do so.

Former NFL and Marshall University quarterback Chad Pennington was hired in 2018 to be coach of Sayre's new football team. In his first year of coaching, he led the team to a 3–5 record. In 2023, the team would go 10–0 during the regular season and making it to the quarter-finals in the 1A tournament. In the 2024 season, where the Spartans won their first Class 1A State Championship.

== See also ==
- National Register of Historic Places listings in Fayette County, Kentucky
