= Boynton Beach, Florida =

- City
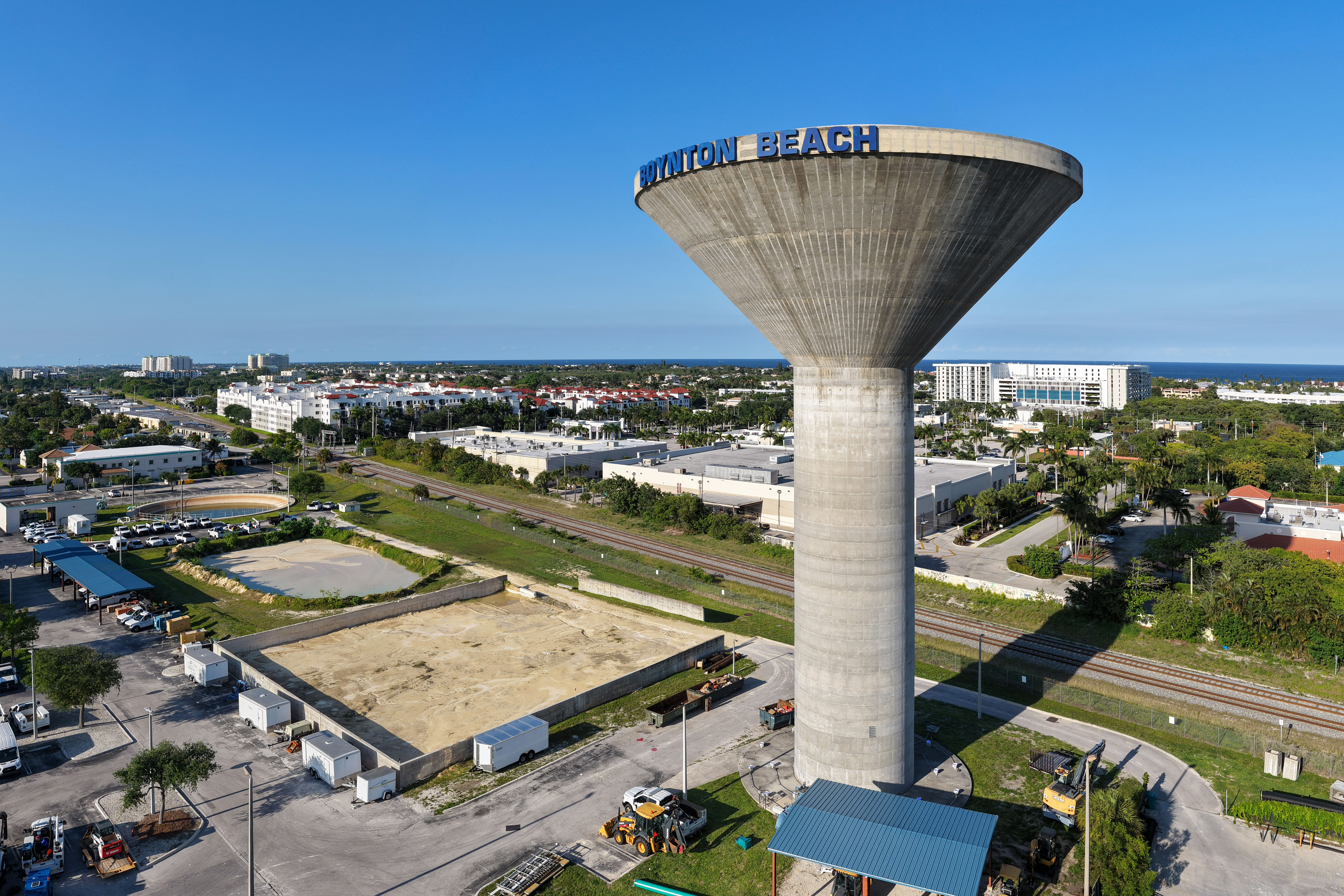
- Downtown featuring the water tower

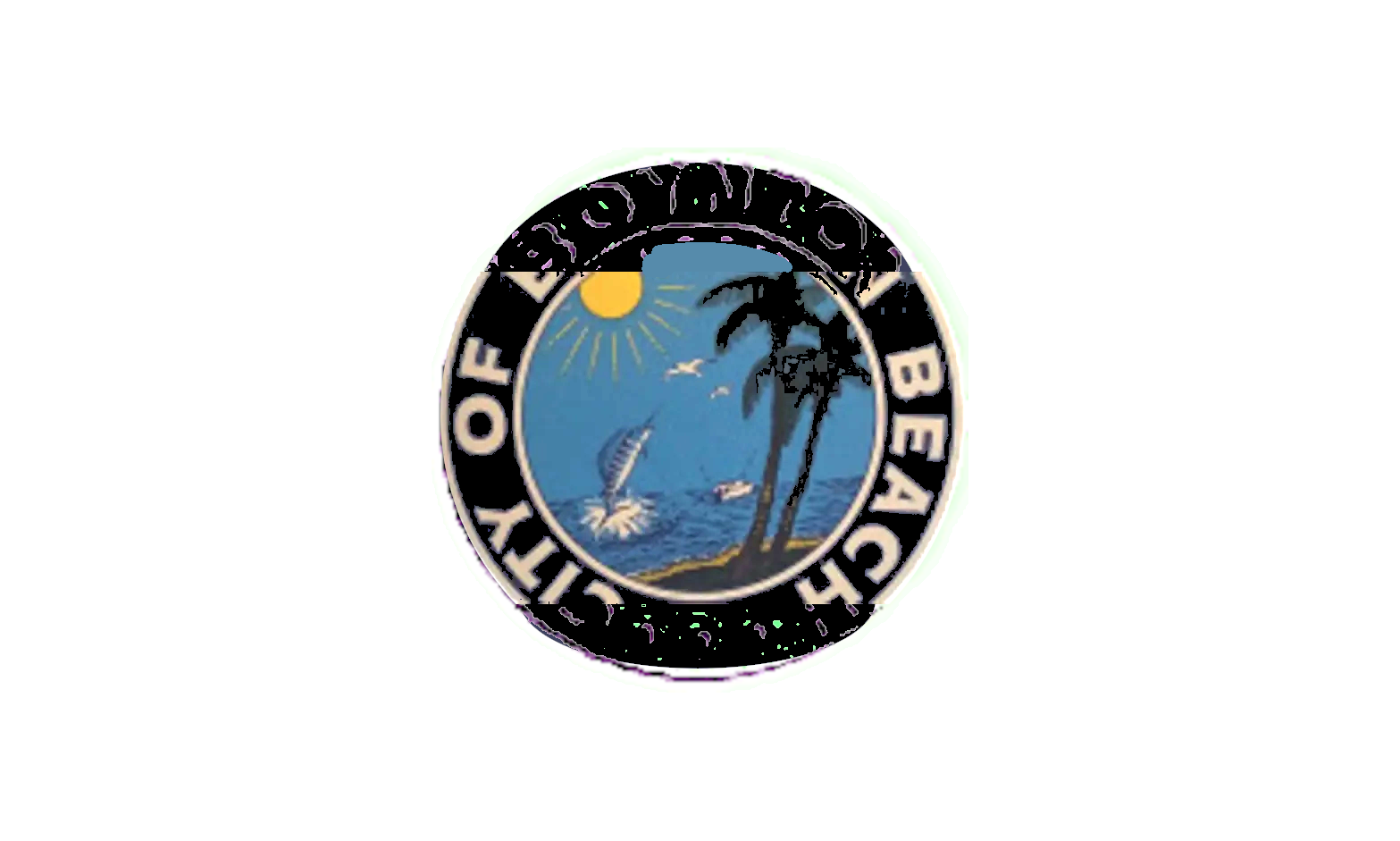
- Flag Seal Coat of arms Wordmark
- Nicknames: Boynton, B-town
- Motto: America's Gateway to the Gulfstream
- Location within Palm Beach County and Florida

- Location in the United States
- Coordinates: 26°30′36″N 80°05′12″W
- Country: United States
- State: Florida
- County: Palm Beach
- Settled (Boynton Settlement): 1895
- Incorporated: 1920

Government
  - Type: Commission-manager

Area
  - Total: 16.57 sq mi (42.91 km^{2})
  - Land: 16.16 sq mi (41.85 km^{2})
  - Water: 0.41 sq mi (1.06 km^{2}) 2.3%
- Elevation: 10 ft (3.0 m)

Population (2020)
  - Total: 80,380
  - Density: 4,975.0/sq mi (1,920.85/km^{2})
- Time zone: UTC-05:00 (EST)
  - Summer (DST): UTC-04:00 (EDT)
- ZIP Codes: 33424–33426, 33435–33437,33474
- Area codes: 561, 728
- FIPS code: 12-07875
- GNIS feature ID: 2403906
- Website: www.boynton-beach.org

Boynton Beach is a city in Palm Beach County, Florida, United States. It is situated about 57 miles (92 km) north of Miami. The 2020 census recorded a population of 80,380. Boynton Beach is located in the Miami metropolitan area, which was home to 6,138,333 people at the 2020 census. The city is named after Nathan Boynton, a Civil War major and Michigan politician who became one of the first settlers in the area in 1895. Boynton Beach is located north of Delray Beach, south of Hypoluxo and Lantana, and east of Golf, while the municipalities of Briny Breezes, Gulf Stream, Manalapan, and Ocean Ridge are located to the east across the Intracoastal Waterway.

Native Americans inhabited what is now Boynton Beach thousands of years ago; a burial mound west of the city includes artifacts dating as far back as roughly 150 BCE. The first nonindigenous settlers, Dexter Hubel and his family, arrived in 1877. Major Boynton moved to present-day Boynton Beach in 1895, building the Boynton Hotel and bringing contingents from Michigan, many of whom practiced farming or established businesses in the vicinity of Ocean Avenue. Byrd and Fred Dewey filed the original plat for the Town of Boynton in 1898, although official incorporation did not occur until 1920. The oceanfront section of Boynton Beach split off in 1931 and became Ocean Ridge in 1939. Boynton Beach's population grew rapidly in the first few decades following World War II, with more than a three-fold increase in the 1950s, while development of the city expanded westward, particularly in the 1980s.

Today, Boynton Beach is the third-most-populous municipality in Palm Beach County, behind only West Palm Beach and Boca Raton. The area along Congress Avenue south of Gateway Boulevard includes a large concentration of restaurants and retail stores at the Boynton Beach Mall, the Boynton Town Center, and Renaissance Commons. Boynton Beach also has several arts and culture facilities, such as the Boynton Woman's Club and Schoolhouse Children's Museum & Learning Center.

== History ==
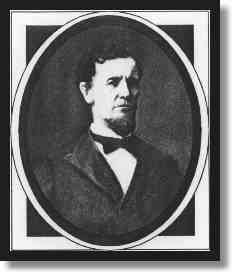
Nathan S. Boynton

See also William S. Linton

Archaeological evidence indicates Native American inhabitation of the region dating back thousands of years, with Ais, Calusa, Jaega, Mayaimi, and Tequesta peoples settling in or near modern-day Palm Beach County. A complex of mounds west of present-day Boynton Beach and near the Loxahatchee National Wildlife Refuge includes shards of pottery possibly from 150 BCE. An excavation of the site also yielded beads and glass from as recently as the 16th century, which are believed to have been influenced by the Spanish.

Captain James A. Armour, head keeper of the Jupiter Inlet Lighthouse, filed the first land claim in Boynton Beach in 1875, although he is unlikely to have lived there. Two years later, Dexter Hubel of Michigan and his family settled in the area, but they had to live at the Orange Grove House of Refuge in present-day Delray Beach until their house was built.

In 1894, two years before Henry Flagler built his railroad, a former American Civil War major named Nathan Boynton first saw the area that now bears his name. Boynton hailed from Port Huron, Michigan. He was so impressed by the natural beauty of the year-round sunshine and pristine beaches, he built the famous Boynton Hotel, where he also spent winters with his family. The hotel, which opened in 1897, included accommodations for 100 guests, with five guest cottages. Major Boynton died on May 27, 1911, in Port Huron, but the hotel lasted until 1925. Several commercial and residential buildings also sprang up along Ocean Avenue in the late 1890s, including the first post office in 1896.

The first settlers, whom Boynton had brought along from Michigan, soon realized that many fruits and vegetables thrived in the fertile climate. Pineapples, tomatoes, mangoes, and citrus fruit were packed in crates and shipped across the country on the newly built Florida East Coast Railroad. Alonzo King and Samuel Cade, both African-American farmers, taught these early settlers methods for cultivating muck soil and dealing with the presence of mosquitos and rattlesnakes.

Boynton Beach was founded on September 26, 1898, when Byrd Spilman Dewey and her husband Fred S. Dewey filed the original plat in the Dade County courthouse for the Town of Boynton. Fred S. Dewey, one of Flager's secretaries, bought a large area of land west of the Intracoastal Waterway earlier that year. He subdivided the land into 2.5 acre (1.0 ha) tracts for agricultural uses, which he sold to settlers and hotel workers. Buyers of these tracts also received a plot within the residential sections of the townsite.

A wood-frame schoolhouse opened in 1900 at Ocean Avenue and Seacrest Boulevard, replacing a smaller, temporary building. By then, the town had a population of 83. Just four years later, a second, two-room school building opened as the community continued to grow quickly. Overcrowding at the school at Ocean Avenue and Seacrest Boulevard also led to the construction of another school in 1913, a two-story concrete building with six classrooms. This building is listed on the National Register of Historic Places and was converted into the Schoolhouse Children's Museum and Learning Center in 2001.

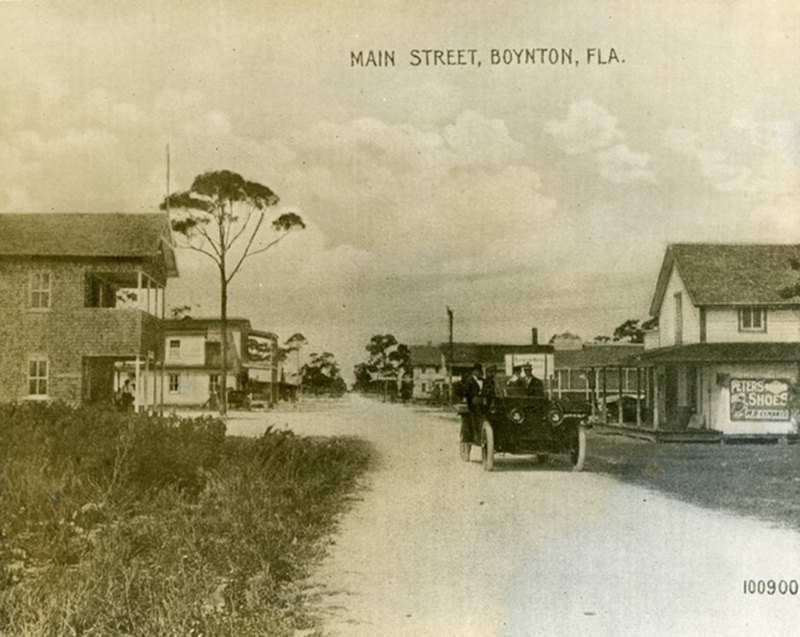
Ocean Avenue in 1915

The first bridge crossing the Intracoastal Waterway opened in 1911 at Ocean Avenue. During the same year, the Boynton Woman's Club and the Florida Federal of Women's Clubs established the first library in Boynton, then staffed by volunteers. The 1910s also had the creation of the town's first bank in 1915 and first ocean road (State Road A1A) in 1916.

The town of Boynton was officially incorporated in 1920 upon the approval of 48 of the 50 qualified voters who met at the Boynton Lumber Club on April 14. G. E. Coon became the first mayor, Fred Benson became the first town marshall, and A. A. Atwater, J. P. Bowen, C. M. Jensen, A. C. Shepherd, and W. S. Shepherd became the first aldermen. Shortly before the incorporation of Boynton, the 1920 census recorded a population of 671 people in Palm Beach County's fourth precinct, which also included Hypoluxo and the area that now comprises Ocean Ridge. The name "Boynton Beach" was first used by a community that broke off from the Town of Boynton in 1931. In 1939, that community changed its name to "Ocean Ridge", while The Town of Boynton took the name "Boynton Beach" in 1941.

Utility services also began in Boynton in the early 1920s. John Meredith brought electricity to the town in 1921, the same year as the installation of a sewage system. Additionally in 1923, a municipal water system began operating. Telephone service arrived in Boynton near the end of the 1920s.

Boynton Beach Oceanfront Park is located just north of the original Boynton Hotel site. In 1921, the Town of Boynton acquired the beach site from Lewis S. Howe by eminent domain for park and recreation purposes. The beach casino was built in 1928 and featured a large dining hall, locker rooms, and showers, and residents used the casino for parties and social gatherings. The casino was demolished in 1967, and the property remained part of the beach park. From the 1920s to today, Boynton Beach Oceanfront Park has been popular with residents and visitors alike. In the mid-1990s, the park underwent a major renovation during which the boardwalk was rebuilt out of recycled plastic. Boynton Beach's Oceanfront Park was voted the best family beach in Palm Beach County by The Palm Beach Post in 2001. In 2011, the boardwalk was renovated again, replacing the plastic with ipe wood (commonly known as Brazilian walnut). In 2012, improvements were made to the buildings along the boardwalk, including total refurbishment of the restrooms.

A 1940s view of the Boynton Beach Seaboard Air Line Railroad depot, whose demolition was authorized by the city in 2006

In 1926, the Seaboard Air Line Railway entered what was then simply Boynton, spurring land development a mile inland near the Seaboard station, including the town's first planned subdivision, Lake Boynton Estates. As land became more valuable, areas along the Intracoastal Waterway and the Federal Highway in Boynton also saw housing developments. To the west, many dairies were founded so that the Boynton area became the main milk supplier for Palm Beach County. By the 1970s, the dairies were no longer profitable, and these lands, too, were converted to housing developments.

Three hurricanes affected Boynton between 1926 and 1928. The 1928 Okeechobee hurricane in particular caused significant impacts, destroying 46 homes and 18 buildings, including a church, a hotel, and the town hall. Additionally, the storm damaged 255 homes and 34 buildings, including the high school, where 15 people suffered injuries after auditorium roof collapsed. The hurricane rendered 56 families homeless and caused about $1 million in damages. The Boynton town government faced financial struggles in the aftermath of the 1928 hurricane and during the Great Depression, but received some assistance from the Florida Legislature and negotiated with bondholders for additional debt relief. Funds from the state also resulted in the resurfacing of Dixie Highway, while federal funds were used to construct a new bridge across the Intracoastal Waterwater in 1935.

Boynton Beach grew very rapidly in the 1950s, with its population expanding from 2,542 people in 1950 to 10,467 people in 1960, a 311.8% increase. Significant construction projects during the decade included a new city hall at Boynton Beach Boulevard and Seacrest Boulevard in 1958 and Bethesda Memorial Hospital in 1959. The expansion of beachfront recreation facilities also occurred as the city purchased more coastal properties.

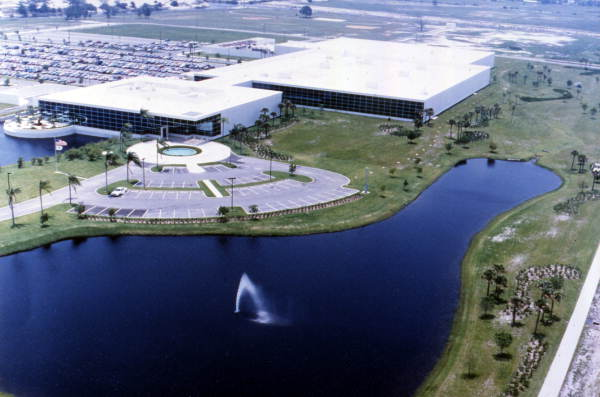
The Motorola paging plant (circa 1983)

During the 1960s, the city constructed a civic center in 1960, a public library in 1961, and a new water-treatment plant in 1962. A second bridge across the Intracoastal Waterway opened in 1967 along 15th Avenue (Woolbright Road). The decade also marked beginning of the construction of Interstate 95 through the city (completed in 1977), the westward expansion of Boynton Beach Boulevard in 1962, the southward extension of Congress Avenue in 1966. Additionally, residential projects such as the large Hampshire Gardens, Leisureville, and Sterling Village sprang up, causing further growth and economic development. A few civil rights movement protests also occurred in Boynton Beach during the 1960s, including a sit-in at the Royal Castle Restaurant and the arrival of around 30 African Americans at a whites-only section of the beach in 1962.

Several developments also brought a substantial economic boost to Boynton Beach in the 1980s. First, Motorola opened a new paging plant in the city in 1983, although the complex closed in 2004, about 10 years after its peak, when the facility employed roughly 3,500 people. Next, the Boynton Beach Mall and Quantum Corporate Park opened in 1985 and 1988, respectively. Additionally, Tri-Rail began operating in 1989, opening its station in Boynton Beach in December of that year. Each of these factors attracted more businesses to the area and generated rapid population increases in the city's western suburbs.

Hurricane Wilma struck Boynton Beach on October 24, 2005, causing widespread damage to homes and businesses. In 2006, the city government authorized the demolition of the historic Seaboard rail station, which had survived intact in private hands since passenger service to the station halted in 1971.

In September 2021, Boynton Beach became the first city to support the plant-based treaty to encourage global policymakers to address the supposed climate impacts of animal agriculture. On March 8, 2022, Ty Penserga was elected mayor of Boynton Beach in Florida, making him the first openly gay mayor of the city, as well as the first out LGBTQ Asian-American mayor elected in Florida state history. A high-school biology and chemistry teacher, Penserga was sworn into office by State Attorney Dave Aronberg.

== Crime ==
The crime rate started decreasing in 2017 and attained its lowest number in 20 years in 2020. According to the Florida Department of Law Enforcement's 2020 Annual Crime Report, the total crime rate decreased by 28% in the city compared to 2019 and 64% compared to 2001. Violent crime, which includes murder, rape, robbery, and aggravated assault, decreased 8.5%. Property crime, which includes burglary, larceny, and motor-vehicle theft, dropped by 32.2%. Florida's total crime volume dropped 14.1% compared to 2019. Boynton Beach Police Chief Michael G. Gregory attributed the decrease to focused efforts, an all-hands-on-deck approach, and "using a multitude of tactics and crime-fighting strategies that are constantly evolving based on crime patterns".

== Demographics ==
Historical population
Census	Pop.	Note	%±
1930	1,053		—
1940	1,326		25.9%
1950	2,542		91.7%
1960	10,467		311.8%
1970	18,115		73.1%
1980	35,624		96.7%
1990	46,194		29.7%
2000	60,389		30.7%
2010	68,217		13.0%
2020	80,380		17.8%
U.S. Decennial Census

=== Racial and ethnic composition ===
Historical demographics	2020	2010	2000	1990	1980
White (non-Hispanic - NH)	47.3%	53.6%	64.4%	73.5%	78.3%
Hispanic or Latino	15.4%	12.8%	9.2%	6.8%	4.0%
Black or African American (NH)	30.6%	29.6%	22.5%	19.0%	17.2%
Asian and Pacific Islander (NH)	2.4%	2.1%	1.5%	0.6%	0.5%
Native American (NH)	0.1%	0.1%	0.1%	0.1%	0.5%
Some other race (NH)	0.7%	0.3%	0.2%	< 0.1%	0.5%
Two or more races (NH)	3.4%	1.5%	2.0%	N/A	N/A
Population	80,380	68,217	60,389	46,194	35,624

Boynton Beach, Florida – Racial and ethnic composition Note: the US Census treats Hispanic/Latino as an ethnic category. This table excludes Latinos from the racial categories and assigns them to a separate category. Hispanics/Latinos may be of any race.
Race / Ethnicity (NH = Non-Hispanic)	Pop 2000	Pop 2010	Pop 2020	% 2000	% 2010	% 2020
White (NH)	38,897	36,534	37,989	64.41%	53.56%	47.26%
Black or African American (NH)	13,585	20,218	24,604	22.50%	29.64%	30.61%
Native American or Alaska Native (NH)	82	100	92	0.14%	0.15%	0.11%
Asian (NH)	898	1,438	1,896	1.49%	2.11%	2.36%
Pacific Islander or Native Hawaiian (NH)	24	21	18	0.04%	0.03%	0.02%
Some other race (NH)	105	179	602	0.17%	0.26%	0.75%
Multiracial (NH)	1,234	1,025	2,763	2.04%	1.50%	3.44%
Hispanic or Latino (any race)	5,564	8,702	12,416	9.21%	12.76%	15.45%
Total	60,389	68,217	80,380	100.00%	100.00%	100.00%

=== 2020 census ===
As of the 2020 census, Boynton Beach had a population of 80,380. The median age was 43.5 years; 17.5% of residents were under 18 and 22.7% were 65 or older. For every 100 females, there were 89.4 males, and for every 100 females 18 and over, there were 86.9 males 18 and over.

All of the residents lived in urban areas, while none lived in rural areas.

Of the 34,108 households in Boynton Beach, 23.2% had children under 18 living in them, 37.3% were married-couple households, 21.1% were households with a male householder and no spouse or partner present, and 33.2% were households with a female householder and no spouse or partner present. About 33.3% of all households were made up of individuals and 14.8% had someone living alone who was 65 or older.

The city had 39,731 housing units, of which 14.2% were vacant. The homeowner vacancy rate was 2.0% and the rental vacancy rate was 8.8%.

Racial composition as of the 2020 census
Race	Number	Percentage
White	40,911	50.9%
Black or African American	25,103	31.2%
American Indian and Alaska Native	251	0.3%
Asian	1,910	2.4%
Native Hawaiian and other Pacific Islander	20	0.0%
Some other race	3,955	4.9%
Two or more races	8,230	10.2%
Hispanic or Latino (of any race)	12,416	15.4%

=== 2010 census ===
As of the 2010 United States census, 68,217 people, 29,172 households, and 15,743 families were residing in the city. The population density was 4,217.5 inhabitants per square mile (1,628.4/km^{2}). The 29,172 housing units (19.8% of which were vacant) averaged 2,190.04 inhabitants per square mile (845.6/km^{2}) inhabitants per square mile.

In 2010 in the city, the age distribution was 21.5% at 65 or older, 19.3% under 18, 8.0% from 18 to 24, 26.9% from 25 to 44, and 24.6% from 45 to 64; the median age was 41.4 years. For every 100 females, there were 89 males. For every 100 females 18 and over, there were 87 females. Around 25.1% of the households had children under 18 living with them, 16.6% were married couples living together, 13.1% had a female householder with no spouse present, and 43.1% were not families. About 34.3% of all households were made up of one individual, and 15.7% had someone living alone who was 65 or older. The average household size was 2.3, and the average family size was 3.0.

=== 2000 census ===
As of the 2000 census, 60,389 people and 15,673 families resided in the city. The population density was 3,803.5 inhabitants per square mile (1,468.3/km^{2}). The 30,643 housing units had an average density of 1,930.0 persons per square mile (745.0 persons/km^{2}). The racial makeup of the city was 70.36% White (64.4% were Non-Hispanic White), 22.89% African American, 0.22% Native American, 1.52% Asian, 0.05% Pacific Islander, 2.36% from other races, and 2.60% from two or more races. About 9.21% of the population were Hispanic or Latino of any race.

Of the 26,210 households, 22.2% had children under 18 living with them, 45.4% were married couples living together, 10.9% had a woman whose husband did not live with her, and 40.2% were not families. About 33.0% of all households were made up of individuals, and 17.8% had someone living alone who was 65 or older. The average household size was 2.26, and the average family size was 2.87.

In 2000, the age distribution was 19.9% under 18, 6.4% from 18 to 24, 28.1% from 25 to 44, 19.8% from 45 to 64, and 25.8% who are 65 or older. The median age was 42 years. For every 100 females, there were 87.9 males. For every 100 females 18 and over, there were 84.5 males.

As of 2000, the median income in the city for a household was $39,845 and for a family was $47,546. Males had a median income of $32,503 versus $26,399 for females. The per capita income for the city was $22,573. About 7.4% of families and 10.2% of the population were below the poverty line, including 17.9% of those under 18 and 7.2% of those 65 or over.

Native speakers of English accounted for 80.09% of all residents in 2000, while speakers of French Creole comprised 7.51%, Spanish was at 7.30%, French consisted of 1.02%, Italian at 0.97%, and German made up 0.87% of the population.

== Economy ==
In 2021, Boynton Beach had a labor force of 41,266 people, while 25,208 people 16 or older were not in the labor force. By number of employees, the largest employers in Boynton Beach in 2020 were Bethesda Memorial Hospital and the city government, with the former employing 2,579 people and the latter employing 843 people. However, as of 2020, only 11.9% of jobs in Lake Worth Beach were held by city residents, with the most common other residencies being Boca Raton (12.1%), Delray Beach (8.0%), West Palm Beach (7.0%), Palm Springs (4.3%), Fort Lauderdale (2.8%), Deerfield Beach (2.1%), Pompano Beach (1.5%), Wellington (1.3%), and Palm Beach Gardens (1.3%). Among the city's labor force, the most common professions as of 2021 included educational services, and health care and social assistance (22.0%); retail (14.6%); professional, scientific, and management, and administrative and waste management services (14.2%); arts, entertainment, and recreation, and accommodation and food services (11.4%); and finance and insurance, and real estate and rental and leasing (7.0%).

== Schools ==
Like all of Palm Beach County, Boynton Beach is served by the School District of Palm Beach County. As of 2006, it was the fifth-largest school district in Florida and the 12th-largest school district in the United States.

- Citrus Cove Elementary School
- Crosspointe Elementary
- Forest Park Elementary
- Manatee Elementary
- Galaxy Elementary School
- Poinciana Elementary School (magnet school for math, science, and technology
- Congress Middle School
- Boynton Beach Community High School
- South Tech Academy Charter High School
- Crystal Lakes Elementary

== Historic preservation ==
The Boynton Beach Historical Society formed in 1968. According to its website, the historical society's mission is "to act as a living repository for Boynton Beach's traditions and history, to interpret items of historical and antiquarian significance, and to promote a better understanding of the history of Boynton Beach, Palm Beach County, and the State of Florida." The organization does not have a physical location. As such, the Boynton Beach Public Library houses its archives and records. In addition to Boynton Beach, the historical society also maintains materials relevant to the histories of Briny Breezes, Gulf Stream, Hypoluxo, Lake Worth Beach, Lantana, Manalapan, and Ocean Ridge, as well as areas from the city's western boundaries to U.S. Route 441.

The city's Historic Resources and Preservation Board lists 170 historic sites, including commercial and residential buildings, bridges, cemeteries, churches, social clubs, and other architectural features. Additionally, the board maintains two heritage trails, one for the 30 sites listed in downtown and another for the 3 historic cemeteries. Federally, Boynton Beach has two structures listed on the National Register of Historic Places – the Boynton Woman's Club and the Boynton School, now known as the Schoolhouse Children's Museum & Learning Center.

== Public transportation ==
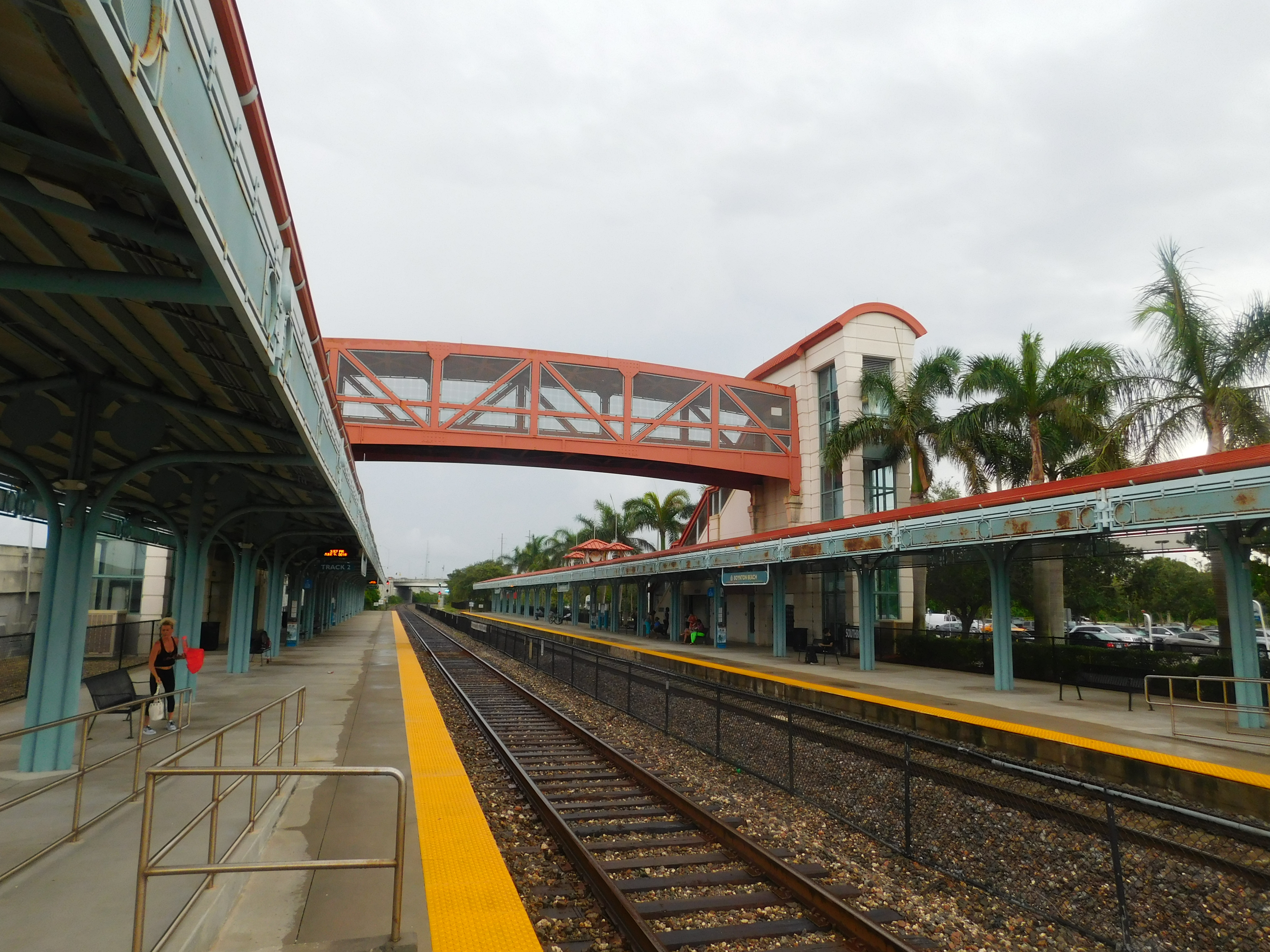
Tri-Rail Station in Boynton Beach

Boynton Beach is served by a Tri-Rail station of the same name linking Boynton Beach to West Palm Beach to the north and Miami to the south. It is also serviced by local buses provided by PalmTran.

== Culture ==
Boynton Beach has an arts district. It was named as one of South Florida's "emerging neighborhoods" by the South Florida Business Journal in 2017.

== Controversy ==
Boynton Beach commissioned a mural showing three of its firefighters, unveiled in 2020, for a window covering at a new fire station. The mural depicted former fire chief Glenn Joseph and former deputy fire chief Latosha Clemons, both of whom are black. Clemons was the city's first black female fire fighter. The mural depicted both of them as white, and Clemons sued the city for defamation, libel, and negligence. The city has since removed the mural and settled the lawsuit.

== Notable people ==
- Tanner Anderson, MLB and Chinese Professional Baseball League player
- Ramon Perez Blackburn, actor-singer-dance
- Danielle Bregoli, rapper, social media personality
- Marlon Byrd, former MLB outfielder for several teams, including the Cleveland Indians
- Jeremy Cain, former NFL long snapper for three teams
- Hector Camacho, Puerto Rican boxer, resided there
- Hillary Cassel, Florida House of Representatives member
- Noah Centineo, actor
- Charles Cornelius, former NFL and CFL player
- Byrd Spilman Dewey, author and Town of Boynton co-founder
- Craig Erickson, former NFL quarterback, played for several teams
- Johnny Farrell, golfer, 1928 U.S. Open champion
- Gar Finnvold, former MLB player for the Boston Red Sox
- James J. Greco, businessman, lived in town 2011-2016
- Jayron Hosley, former NFL cornerback for the New York Giants
- Lamar Jackson, NFL quarterback for the Baltimore Ravens, 2x NFL MVP
- Kelani Jordan, professional wrestler, WWE NXT (NXT Women's North American Champion)
- Ricardo Jordan, former MLB pitcher
- Michael Kelly (baseball), MLB player for the Cleveland Guardians
- Ryan Klesko, MLB player
- Sean Labanowski (born 1992), Israeli-American basketball player in the Israeli National League
- Dov Markus (born 1946), Israeli-American soccer player
- Vincent Mason, rapper, producer, DJ, and one-third of hip hop trio De La Soul
- Hilary McRae, singer, songwriter
- Tristan Nunez, racing driver
- Almerin C. O'Hara, US Army major general
- Titus O'Neil, professional wrestler
- Harvey Eugene Oyer III, attorney and author
- Charlie W. Pierce, Florida pioneer and author
- Rick Rhoden, former MLB player
- Otis Thorpe, NBA basketball player
- Trea Turner, MLB Player with the Philadelphia Phillies, 2019 World Series champion
- Mike Waltz, U.S. representative for Florida and United States ambassador to the United Nations
- Howard E. Wasdin, sniper in Navy SEAL Team Six
- Vince Wilfork, former tackle, two-time Super Bowl champion (XXXIX and XLIX)
- Mark Worrell, MLB Player
- Danny Young, MLB player with the Atlanta Braves

== See also ==
- Church of Our Savior, MCC
