= Schoolhouse Children's Museum & Learning Center =

- Boynton School
- U.S. National Register of Historic Places
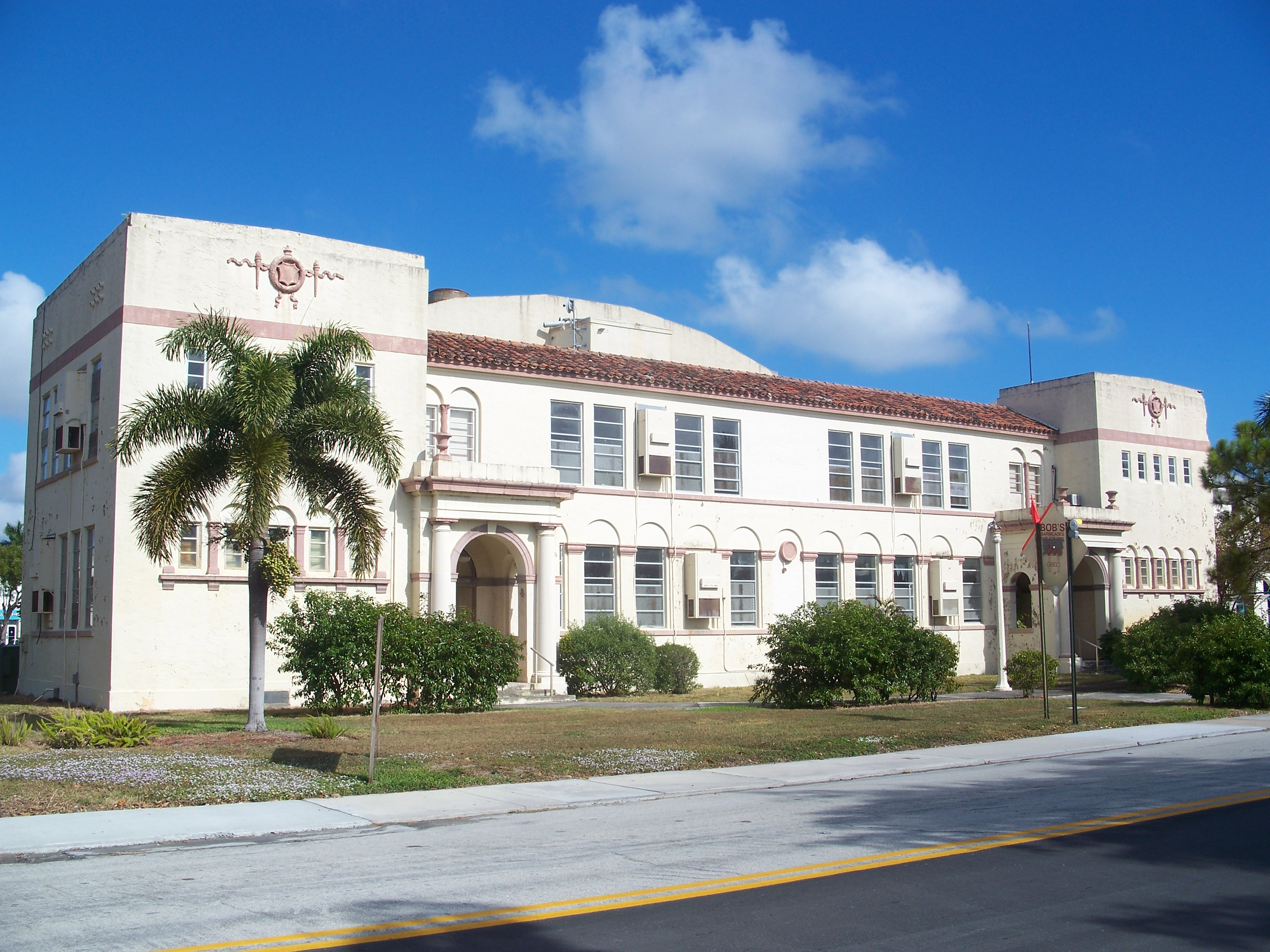

- Location within Florida Location within the United States
- Location: Boynton Beach, Florida
- Coordinates: 26°31′38″N 80°3′48″W
- NRHP reference No.: 94000139
- Added to NRHP: March 7, 1994

The Schoolhouse Children's Museum & Learning Center is located in a historic school building, the Boynton School (also known as the Boynton Beach Elementary School), at 129 East Ocean Avenue in Boynton Beach, Palm Beach County, Florida. Designed by William W. Maughlin of West Palm Beach, the school was established in 1913 and initially served students of all grades until a high school opened next door in 1927. The building, a two-story masonry vernacular structure, last functioned as a school and community center in the 1980s, before restoration work the following decade. On March 7, 1994, the Boynton School was listed on the National Register of Historic Places. The Schoolhouse Children's Museum & Learning Center opened in 2001 at the former schoolhouse.

== The school ==
Around 1896 or 1897, the first schoolhouse of the 70-person community of Boynton Beach opened just north of Ocean Boulevard and east of the Florida East Coast Railway (FEC). Another school, a one-room structure that was also used as a church and community center, opened in 1900. Twelve years later, the construction of a new schoolhouse was approved to replace the 1900 structure. Despite a 1907 Dade County (which then included present-day Palm Beach County) School Board meeting recognizing the need for an educational facility for black students, with African Americans comprising about half of Boynton Beach's population at the time, this school would be "whites only" until the integration of Florida schools in the 1970s.

William W. Maughlin, an architect from West Palm Beach, designed this new schoolhouse, a two-story masonry vernacular building with six classrooms, at 141 E. Ocean Avenue. Carrie Parker and Barbara E. Mattick stated in the National Register of Historic Places (NRHP) registration form that "at a time when sixty per cent of the schools in Florida had no toilet accommodations, and when some large city schools were officially branded as unsafe, the Boynton School was in the vanguard in meeting public expectations for better schools." Boynton Beach's only school for 14 years, it initially housed 12 grades and 81 students enrolled on its opening date, September 8, 1913, including high school students from Hypoluxo and Lantana. Prior to then, older students had to travel to West Palm Beach via the FEC to attend Palm Beach High School, which opened in 1908. Electricity and indoor plumbing were installed at the Boynton School during the 1920s.

The number of students in Palm Beach County increased rapidly in the 1920s. Consequently, a bond issue was approved in 1926 to establish a new school. The 1913 building became an elementary school, while the new schoolhouse next door, completed in 1927, became a high school. Because Boynton Beach students began attending Seacrest High School in 1949, the elementary school started to occupy both the 1913 and 1927 buildings. Parker and Mattick stated that the 1913 Boynton School "had nearly reached the limit of its usefulness by 1966." and was last used for school and community activities in 1989.

Following its closure as a school and community center, the former school became the cornerstone of a revival of downtown Boynton Beach in the 1990s. On March 7, 1994, it was added to the NRHP. The building underwent a $14 million restoration in 1998 and 1999 funded by the City of Boynton Beach and the Florida Division of Historical Resources of the Florida Department of State. A historical marker was erected in 2008.

== The museum ==
Since 2001, the former school is the home of the Schoolhouse Children's Museum & Learning Center. The 2008 historical marker, sponsored by the Boynton Beach Cultural Center, City of Boynton Beach, and the Florida Department of State describes the museum's mission as "to encourage families to learn the history of Boynton Beach and Palm Beach County through interactive exhibitions and programs." Approximately 252,000 people visited the museum between 2001 and September 2008. It features hands-on, interactive exhibits about history, maritime history, marine life, local and regional history, and period home, general store, and school life displays. The website of the Schoolhouse Children's Museum & Learning Center notes that the "exhibits provide an interactive glimpse of life for early Florida Pioneers – before the days of computers, cell phones, televisions or even cars."

== See also ==
- National Register of Historic Places listings in Palm Beach County, Florida
- School District of Palm Beach County
