= List of mayors of Saginaw, Michigan =

This is a list of mayors of Saginaw, Michigan.

== City of East Saginaw 1859–1889 ==
The City of East Saginaw was incorporated in 1859 and existed until it was consolidated with the City of Saginaw in 1889 (effective 1890). The City Charter was granted by the legislature. Mayors were elected for one-year terms.

Mayor	Start of term	End of term	Notes
William L. P. Little	1859	1859	
William J. Bartlow	1860	1860	
Charles B. Mott	1861	1862	
William F. Glasby	1863	1863	
James F. Brown	1864	1864	
Samuel W. Yawkey	1865	1865	
Dwight G. Holland	1866	1866	
Wellington R. Burt	1867	1867	
James L. Ketcham	1868	1869	
John G. Owen	1870	1870	
Leander Simoneau	1871	1871	
Charles L. Ortman	1872	1872	
William L. Webber	1873	1873	
Herbert H. Hoyt	1874	1874	
Chauncey W. Wisner	1875	1876	
Bradley M. Thompson	1877	1878	
John Welch	1879	1881	
Leander Simoneau	1882	1882	
Frank Lawrence	1883	1883	
John S. Estabrook	1884	1885	
Henry M. Youmans	1886	1887	
William B. Baum	1888	1889	Last mayor of the City of East Saginaw. Later served as mayor of the (consolidated) City of Saginaw under the 1889 City Charter.

== City Charter of 1889 ==
The City of East Saginaw and the City of Saginaw were consolidated by an act of the Legislature of the State of Michigan in 1889 and was given the same name as the former City of Saginaw. The city charter was granted by legislative act and provided for an elected executive mayor and a city council consisting of 21 aldermen elected from several wards in the city.

Mayor	Start of term	End of term	Notes
George W. Weadock	1890	1892	First mayor of the consolidated City of Saginaw under the 1889 City Charter
William S. Linton	1892	1894	
William B. Mershon	1895	1896	
William B. Baum	1896	1904	
Henry E. Lee	1904	1906	
William B. Baum	1906	1908	
George W. Stewart, M.D.	1908	1912	
Albert William Tausend	1912	1914	Last mayor under the 1889 Charter

== City Charter of 1913 ==
The Legislature of the State of Michigan enacted the Home Rule Cities Act in 1909 that permitted cities to frame and adopt their own Charters. In 1913 the electors of the City of Saginaw adopted a Charter following the Commission form of government. It became effective January 1, 1914 at which time the mayor and commissioners took office.

Mayor	Start of term	End of term	Notes
Ard E. Richardson	January 1, 1914	April 11, 1915	
Hilem F. Paddock	April 11, 1915	March 1919	Resigned in March 1919
Robert F. Johnson	March 1919	April 1919	Acting mayor
Ben N. Mercer	April 1919	April 1923	

== City Charter of 1936 ==
Under the current city charter, effective January 6, 1936, the mayoral term in Saginaw is two years. The mayor is chosen by the City Council from among its own members at the first meeting following a regular municipal election which takes place in November of odd-numbered years. The first city council under the current charter took office on January 6, 1936, and chose a mayor at that time to serve until after the 1937 municipal election. Elections were held in April from 1937 through 1971, at which time it was changed to November.

Image	Mayor	Start of term	End of term	Notes
	Frank Marxer	January 6, 1936	April 12, 1937	First mayor under Council-Manager form of government (City Charter of 1936)
	Francis J. McDonald	April 12, 1937	April 10, 1939	
	John W. Symons Jr.	April 10, 1939	April 14, 1941	
	William J. Brydges	April 14, 1941	April 12, 1943	
	Eric F. Wieneke	April 12, 1943	April 9, 1945	
	Harold J. Stenglein	April 9, 1945	April 11, 1949	Two terms served as mayor. First mayor to serve more than one term.
	Edwin W. Koepke	April 11, 1949	April 9, 1951	
	William R. Hart	April 9, 1951	April 13, 1953	
	George H. Fischer	April 13, 1953	April 11, 1955	
	Maurice E. Brown	April 11, 1955	April 8, 1957	
	R. James Harvey	April 8, 1957	April 13, 1959	
	R. Dewey Stearns	April 13, 1959	April 10, 1961	
	G. Stewart Francke	April 10, 1961	April 12, 1965	Two terms served as mayor.
	James W. Stenglein	April 12, 1965	April 10, 1967	
	Henry G. Marsh	April 10, 1967	April 14, 1969	First African-American to serve as Mayor
	Warren C. Light	April 14, 1969	April 12, 1971	
	Paul H. Wendler	April 12, 1971	November 13, 1973	Served an extended length term because elections were moved to November from April during his term.
	William F. Nelson Jr.	November 13, 1973	November 10, 1975	
	Raymond M. Tortora	November 10, 1975	November 14, 1977	
	Joe Stephens	November 14, 1977	November 12, 1979	Second African-American to serve as Mayor
	Vacant	November 12, 1979	December 10, 1979	The council was deadlocked for nearly one month in selecting a mayor.
	Paul P. Prudhomme	December 10, 1979	November 9, 1981	
	Ronald M. Bushey	November 9, 1981	November 14, 1983	
	Lawrence D. Crawford	November 14, 1983	November 9, 1987	Two terms as mayor. Third African-American to serve as Mayor
	Delbert J. Schrems	November 9, 1987	November 13, 1989	
	Henry H. Nickleberry	November 13, 1989	November 8, 1993	Two terms as mayor. Fourth African-American to serve as Mayor
	Gary L. Loster	November 8, 1993	November 12, 2001	Four terms as mayor. Fifth African-American to serve as Mayor (Only mayor under 1936 charter to serve more than two terms.) Former police chief.
	Wilmer Jones Ham	November 12, 2001	November 14, 2005	Two terms as mayor. First female and first African-American female to serve as mayor. Her son, Darvin Ham, played in the NBA.
	Carol B. Cottrell	November 14, 2005	November 12, 2007	
	Joyce J. Seals	November 12, 2007	November 9, 2009	second African-American female to serve as mayor
	Greg Branch	November 9, 2009	November 11, 2013	Two terms as mayor.
	Dennis Browning	November 11, 2013	2018	A 2013 change in election schedule from odd years to even years means Browning will be the only mayor under this charter to serve a three-year term. Browning's first term ended on November 14, 2016.
	Floyd Kloc	2018	2019	
	Brenda Moore	2020	Incumbent	

== See also ==
- Government of Saginaw, Michigan
- Saginaw, Michigan
