= Ferdinand Brucker =

American politician (1858–1904)

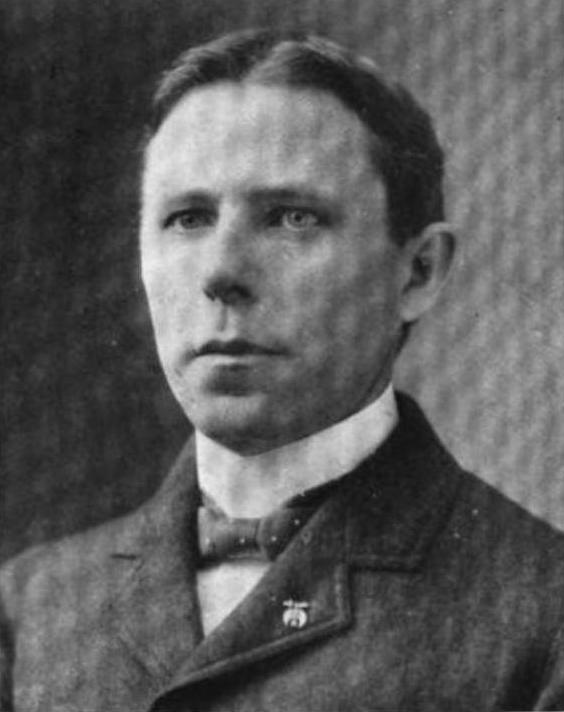

Member of the U.S. House of Representatives from Michigan's 8th district
- In office March 4, 1897 – March 3, 1899
- Preceded by: William S. Linton
- Succeeded by: Joseph W. Fordney

Personal details
- Born: January 8, 1858 Bridgeport, Michigan, US
- Died: March 3, 1904 (aged 46) Saginaw, Michigan, US
- Resting place: Oak Grove Cemetery in Bridgeport
- Party: Democratic
- Education: University of Michigan Law School
- Occupation: Lawyer

Ferdinand Brucker (January 8, 1858 – March 3, 1904) was an American lawyer and politician from the U.S. state of Michigan. He served one term in the United States House of Representatives from 1897 to 1899.

== Early life and education ==
Brucker was born in Bridgeport, Michigan, where he attended the common schools. He was a member of the State militia 1878-1881. He graduated from the law department of the University of Michigan at Ann Arbor in 1881, was admitted to the bar the same year, and commenced practice in Saginaw.

== Political career ==
He was an alderman of East Saginaw, 1882–1884, a judge of the probate court of Saginaw County, 1888–1896, and a delegate to the 1896 Democratic National Convention.

=== Congress ===
Brucker was elected as a Democrat from Michigan's 8th congressional district to the 55th Congress, serving from March 4, 1897, to March 3, 1899. He was an unsuccessful candidate for reelection in 1898, losing to Joseph W. Fordney.

== Death ==
After leaving Congress, Ferdinand Brucker resumed the practice of law.

He died in Saginaw, and is interred in Oak Grove Cemetery in Bridgeport. His son, Wilber M. Brucker, later served as Governor of Michigan from 1931 to 1932.

U.S. House of Representatives
Preceded by William S. Linton	United States Representative for the 8th congressional district of Michigan; 1897 – 1899	Succeeded by Joseph W. Fordney
