= Joseph W. Fordney =

American politician (1853–1932)

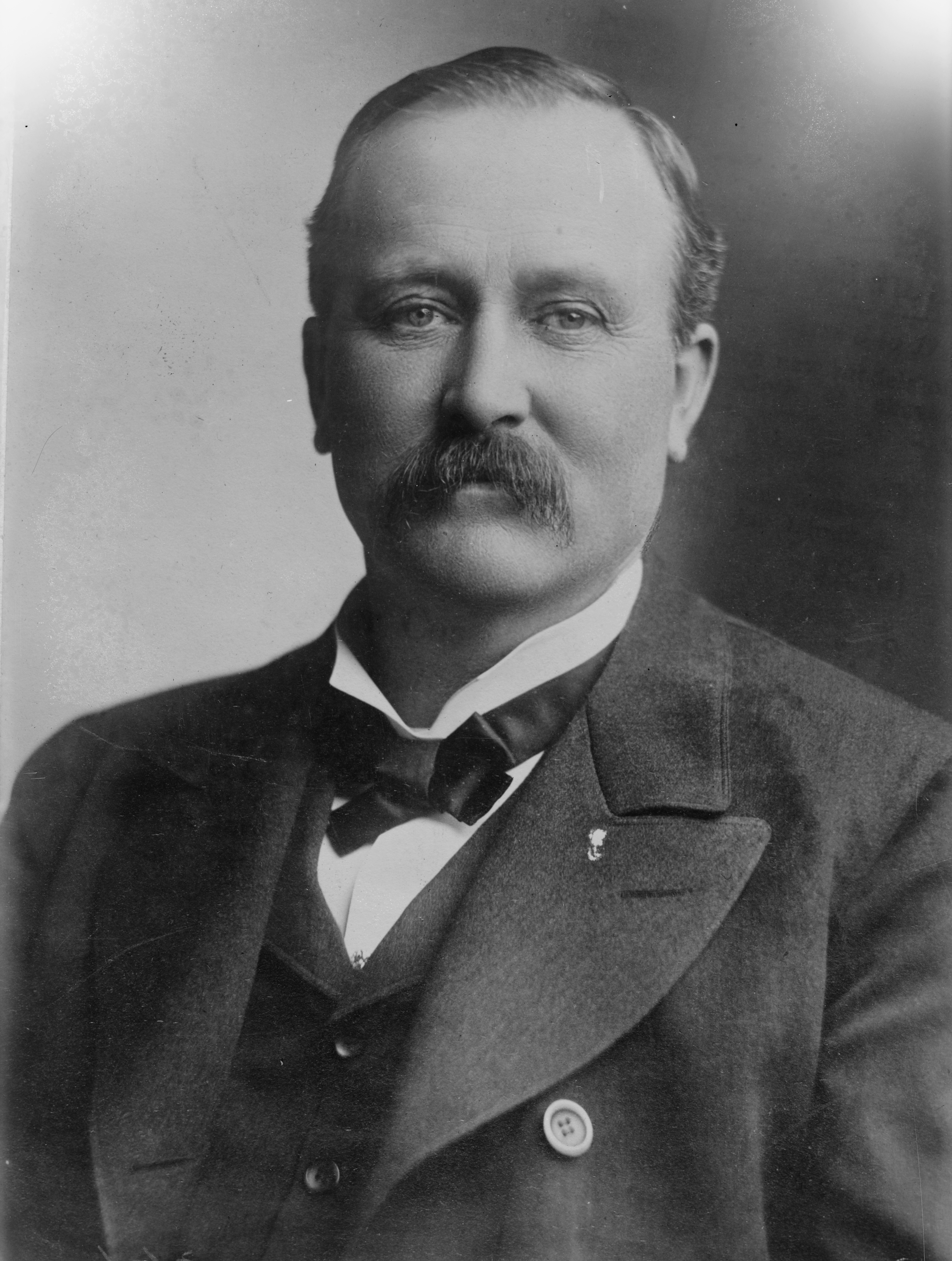
- Fordney, c. 1915–1920

Member of the U.S. House of Representatives from Michigan's 8th district
- In office March 4, 1899 – March 3, 1923
- Preceded by: Ferdinand Brucker
- Succeeded by: Bird John Vincent

Personal details
- Born: Joseph Warren Fordney; November 5, 1853 Hartford City, Indiana
- Died: January 8, 1932 (aged 78) Saginaw, Michigan
- Party: Republican
- Occupation: Lumber executive

Joseph Warren Fordney (November 5, 1853 – January 8, 1932) was an American Republican politician from Saginaw, Michigan. He represented Saginaw County and the surrounding area of Central Michigan in the U.S. House of Representatives for twenty-four years.

== Biography ==
Fordney was born on a farm near Hartford City, Indiana, where he attended the common schools. He moved to Saginaw, Michigan, in June 1869 and engaged in the lumber industry. Afterward became the owner of extensive lumber enterprises and the vice president of the Saginaw Board of Trade. He was also a member of the Saginaw Board of Aldermen from 1896 to 1900.

In November 1898, Fordney defeated incumbent Democrat Ferdinand Brucker to be elected as a Republican from Michigan's 8th congressional district to the 56th United States Congress. He was subsequently re-elected to the eleven succeeding Congresses, serving from March 4, 1899 to March 3, 1923. The November 1903 Congressional Directory notes that Fordney "is also interested in an artificial-ice plant at Hartford City, Ind." Fordney served as the chairman of the Committee on Expenditures in the Department of the Navy in the 59th Congress; and of the Committee on Ways and Means in the 66th and 67th Congresses. He was one of 14 representatives, all Republicans, to oppose the Sixteenth Amendment to the United States Constitution, which imposed a federal income tax, and he co-sponsored the 1922 Fordney–McCumber Tariff. He declined to be a candidate for renomination in 1922. He was also a delegate to the Republican National Conventions in 1908, 1924, and 1928.

After leaving Congress, Fordney returned to the lumber business in Saginaw and was also interested in banking and agricultural pursuits. He died in Saginaw and is interred there in St. Andrew’s Cemetery.

== Bibliography ==
- Russell, John A. Joseph Warren Fordney: An American Legislator. Boston: The Stratford Co., 1928.

== Sources ==
- United States Congress. "Joseph W. Fordney (id: F000271)". Biographical Directory of the United States Congress.
- The Political Graveyard

U.S. House of Representatives
Preceded by Ferdinand Brucker	United States representative for the 8th congressional district of Michigan; 1899–1923	Succeeded by Bird J. Vincent
