= Nathan Boynton =

American politician from Michigan (1837–1911)

Nathan Smith Boynton
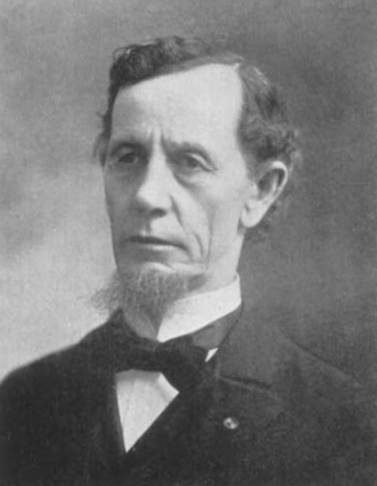
- Born: June 23, 1837; Port Huron, Michigan
- Died: May 27, 1911 (aged 73); Port Huron, Michigan
- Occupations: Politician, businessman, military officer
- Political party: Republican
- Spouse: Anna Fidelei

Nathan Smith Boynton (June 23, 1837 – May 27, 1911) was a Michigan politician, inventor, investor, hotel owner, and a Civil War major. He was born in Port Huron, Michigan, the son of Granville Boynton and Frances (Rendt) Boynton. Frances Rendt was the daughter of Captain Ludwig Rendt, a Hessian soldier who fought for the British in the War of 1812; his wife was from Spain. Boynton was educated in Waukegan, Illinois, and briefly attended medical school in Cincinnati, Ohio, where he married Anna Fidelei. Together, they had five children.

Boynton was elected to the Michigan House of Representatives to represent the St. Clair County's 1st district on the Republican ticket in 1868. By June 1870, Boyton resigned as state representative to move from Marine City back to Port Huron. He served in many capacities there, including as postmaster, newspaper publisher, and mayor. He held patents related to firefighting equipment and commemorative badges. His failing health caused him to seek a warmer climate; Boynton visited South Florida in 1895 with Congressman William S. Linton. Boynton purchased land along the beachfront from Linton and built a wooden, two-story hotel, The Boynton, later called the Boynton Beach Hotel. The associated town west of the hotel was named for Major Boynton on the plat filed by Byrd S. Dewey and her husband Fred S. Dewey on September 26, 1898. The town incorporated in 1920. He served as a delegate to the Michigan state constitutional convention, representing the 11th senatorial district, from 1907 to 1908. Major Boynton died on May 27, 1911, at his home in Port Huron.

Boynton was also the chief organizer and leader of the Knights of the Maccabees, a fraternal organization. He became Great Commander of the Knights of the Maccabees in 1881 and served in that position for 27 years.
