= William S. Linton =

American politician

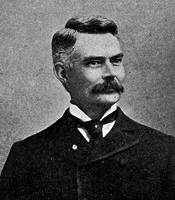

Member of the U.S. House of Representatives from Michigan's 8th district
- In office March 4, 1893 – March 3, 1897
- Preceded by: Henry M. Youmans
- Succeeded by: Ferdinand Brucker

Member of the Michigan House of Representatives
- In office 1887–1888

Mayor of Saginaw
- In office 1892-1894
- Preceded by: George W. Weadock
- Succeeded by: William B. Mershon

Personal details
- Born: February 4, 1856 St. Clair, Michigan
- Died: November 22, 1927 (aged 71) Lansing, Michigan
- Resting place: Forest Lawn Cemetery
- Party: Republican
- Education: University of Michigan

William Seelye Linton (February 4, 1856 – November 22, 1927) was an American businessman and politician who served two terms in the U.S. House of Representatives from Michigan from 1893 to 1897.

== Early life ==
Linton was born in St. Clair, Michigan and moved with his parents to Saginaw in 1859, where he attended the public schools. He engaged as clerk in a store at Farwell and became engaged in various activities connected with the lumber industry at Wells (now Alger).

== Early political career ==
He was a member of the board of supervisors of Bay County for two terms. He returned to Saginaw in 1878 and engaged in the lumber business with his father and also was connected with other business enterprises. He was a member of the East Saginaw common council in 1884 and 1885. He was a member of the Michigan House of Representatives in 1887 and 1888. He was an unsuccessful candidate for Lieutenant Governor of Michigan on the Republican ticket in 1890, losing to Democrat John Strong, Jr. Linton was also president of the Saginaw Water Board and was elected mayor of Saginaw in 1892.

== Personal life ==
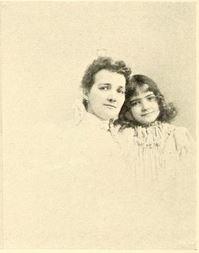
Ida M. Lowry and her daughter Elsie

He married Ida M. Lowry, a native of Romeo, Michigan, though much of her life had been spent at Saginaw, both before and after her marriage. Mr. Linton was a man of affairs at home, and held the most honorable places of trust in the gift of his city, besides being prominent in Masonic circles and an officer of the organization known as the "Independent Order of foresters." They had three children: Ray, the eldest, a younger brother, and Elsie, the only daughter.

== Congress ==
In 1892, running on the Republican Party ticket in Michigan's 8th congressional district, Linton defeated incumbent Democrat Henry M. Youmans, to be elected to the 53rd United States Congress. Linton was re-elected in 1894 to the 54th Congress, serving from March 4, 1893 to March 3, 1897. He was chairman, Committee on Ventilation and Acoustics in the 54th Congress. In 1896, Linton was defeated in the general election by Democrat Ferdinand Brucker.

In 1895, Linton along with David Swinton, visited Florida looking for opportunity investing in what was then an unsettled frontier. In West Palm Beach, which was the end of the line for the railroad, they headed south by boat. Linton and Swinton liked what they saw, and purchased what is today, much of Delray Beach, and Boynton Beach. They then returned to Michigan to recruit settlers. By the fall of that same year, they had signed up eight settlers. The settlement called Linton was established within a year, having cleared palmetto growth, planting crops, and establishing a post office and store. However, by 1897, Linton had financial trouble and sold some of his holdings to Nathan Smith Boynton to raise some money. By 1898, Linton's creditors moved to collect from Linton's settlers, who had been under the impression that he already had clear title to the land. Some settlers headed back north, and Linton's reputation suffered. Linton returned to Michigan, and the settlement was renamed Delray after Delray, Michigan the hometown of W.W. Blackmer, one of the original eight settlers.

== Later career ==
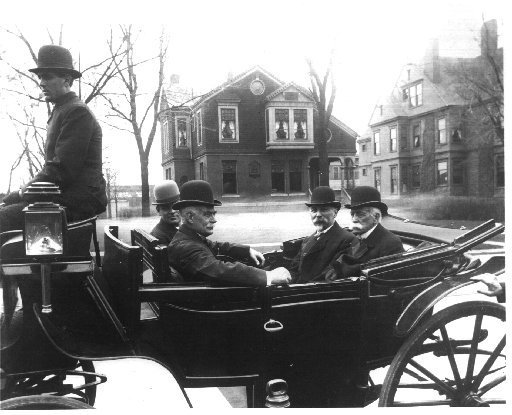
William S. Linton (3rd from left) with dignitaries attend the construction site of Saginaw's City Auditorium on South Washington and Janes in 1908. From left to right: Unknown (driver), Edward Hartwick (editor), William S. Linton, Mayor William B. Baum, Wellington R. Burt (businessman).

Linton was appointed postmaster of Saginaw by U.S. President William McKinley on March 22, 1898, and recommissioned three times, serving until 1914. He was president of the Saginaw Board of Trade 1905-1911 and 1913-1917. He was an unsuccessful candidate for the Republican nomination for Governor of Michigan in 1914, losing to Chase S. Osborn. He was appointed in 1919 a member of the Michigan State Board of Tax Commissioners and was named secretary a few weeks before his death in Lansing. He was interred in Forest Lawn Cemetery in Saginaw.

U.S. House of Representatives
Preceded by Henry M. Youmans	United States Representative for the 8th congressional district of Michigan; 1893 – 1897	Succeeded by Ferdinand Brucker
