= Henry G. Marsh =

American politician (1921–2011)

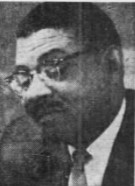

15th Mayor of Saginaw
- In office April 10, 1967 – April 14, 1969
- Preceded by: James W. Stenglein
- Succeeded by: Warren C. Light

Personal details
- Born: Henry Greene Marsh; October 11, 1921 Knoxville, Tennessee
- Died: May 11, 2011 (aged 89) Saginaw, Michigan
- Party: Democratic
- Spouse: Ruth
- Education: Wayne State University Law School; Knoxville College

Military service
- Allegiance: United States of America
- Branch/service: United States Army
- Years of service: 1942–1945
- Rank: Staff sergeant
- Unit: 3280th Quartermaster Service Company
- Battles/wars: World War II

Henry G. Marsh (October 11, 1921 – May 11, 2011) was a Democratic politician from Michigan who served as Mayor of Saginaw, and was the first African-American to hold that office. Marsh was one of the first black mayors in the United States.

== Early life ==
Marsh was born on October 11, 1921, in Knoxville, Tennessee to Thomas and Saidye Marsh. He attended Camden Academy and Knoxville College before being drafted into the U.S. Army in 1942. Marsh served in North Africa, Sicily, and Italy, arriving at the Anzio Beachhead three days before Operation Shingle. Marsh was honorably discharged in December 1945. He then returned to Knoxville College, where he served as the president of the Alpha Phi Alpha fraternity and graduated in June 1947.

Marsh married Ruth Eleanor Claytor on September 1, 1948, in Roanoke, Virginia. Following their marriage, Marsh transferred from law school at the University of Michigan to the Wayne State University Law School since Ruth was a student at the University of Detroit. They had three children: Thomas, Walter, and Terésa.

Marsh graduated from law school in June 1950, and was admitted to the bar in January 1951, opening an office in Detroit where he practiced until moving to Saginaw.

== Move to Saginaw ==
Marsh moved to Saginaw and opened a law office in April 1954. When he arrived, Saginaw was a segregated city where no black man had ever won elected office. Marsh became chairman of the now-extinct Human Rights Commission in 1958. A frequent contributor to The Saginaw News, Marsh ran for and won a seat on the Saginaw City Council in 1961. Though tradition dictated that, as the highest vote-getter, Marsh would receive the title of mayor, he did not, believing that G. Stewart Francke, whom Marsh respected, should serve as mayor considering the difficulties facing the city. Marsh was elected mayor pro tempore in 1965.

=== Mayor of Saginaw ===
Marsh was the city's first African-American mayor. During a time when the 1967 Detroit riot threatened to spill north, Marsh was concerned about the threat of violence from both sides (racially and literally—he ordered that a drawbridge connecting the two sides of the city be raised to stem the flow of traffic from both sides). Marsh formed a committee of over 200 community leaders to discuss concerns facing the city, later calling it his most important accomplishment.

He traveled to Washington, D.C., to convince the United States Department of Housing and Urban Development and Vice President Hubert H. Humphrey that the city should be considered a Model City, part of President Lyndon B. Johnson's Great Society. Look Magazine selected Saginaw as an All-American City and an open housing ordinance was passed during Marsh's tenure as mayor. He retired as the city's chief officer in 1969 to return to his law practice. Shortly after Marsh's retirement, the city council successfully petitioned to have the Interstate 675 bridge over the Saginaw River named in Marsh's honor.

== After politics and retirement ==
Marsh was a co-founder of what was then called First State Bank, which was later acquired by National Bank of Detroit, which in turn through other acquisitions and mergers is now part of J.P. Morgan Chase Bank. He also served as a member of numerous local organizations and commissions. He retired from his law practice in 2000.

=== Death ===
Marsh died of congestive heart failure at the Aleda E. Lutz VA Medical Center in Saginaw on May 11, 2011. His remains were cremated.

== Legacy ==
In 2012, just over a year to the day that Marsh died, the Bridge Center for Racial Harmony posthumously presented its Spirit of the River Award to Marsh. The award is given annually to individuals who have had a significant impact on the region. Marsh's wife Ruth and son Michael accepted the award on his behalf.

The Henry Marsh Institute for Public Policy was founded by a local business leader and friend of Marsh's, and graduated its first class in 2011.
